= 1996–97 DFB-Pokal Frauen =

Tournament details
- Country: Germany
- Teams: 48

Final positions
- Champions: Grün-Weiß Brauweiler
- Runners-up: Eintracht Rheine

Tournament statistics
- Matches played: 47

The Frauen DFB-Pokal 1996–97 was the 17th season of the cup competition, Germany's second-most important title in women's football. In the final which was held in Berlin on 14 June 1997 Grün-Weiß Brauweiler defeated Eintracht Rheine 3–1, thus winning their third cup title.

== First round ==
Several clubs had byes in the first round and were automatically qualified for the second round of the competition. Also as a team promoted to the Bundesliga, VfL Wittekind Wildeshausen would have been eligible to participate in the cup, but did not for reasons unknown.

Rot-Weiß Hillen	0 – 6	Grün-Weiß Brauweiler
SV Brackel	0 – 8	FC Rumeln-Kaldenhausen
SpVgg Oberaußem-Fortuna	0 – 4	Eintracht Rheine
TuS Köln rrh.	0 – 6	Sportfreunde Siegen
Polizei SV Rostock	1 – 5	SSV Schmalfeld
Hamburg	0 – 8	Turbine Potsdam
TuS Westerholz	1 – 5	Tennis Borussia Berlin
Fortuna Magdeburg	2 – 3	WSV Wolfsburg
SC 07 Bad Neuenahr	1 – 8	TuS Niederkirchen
SV Dirmingen	1 – 9	TuS Ahrbach
SV Ellingen	0 – 12	VfR Saarbrücken
TSV Schwaben Augsburg	0 – 4	FSV Frankfurt
SG Kirchhardt	1 – 5	VfL Sindelfingen
Wacker München	1 – 0	SC Klinge Seckach
FF USV Jena	0 – 4	TSV Crailsheim
Fortuna Dresden-Rähnitz	1 – 3	FSV DJK Schwarzbach

== Second round ==
VfL DJK Willich	0 – 10	Eintracht Rheine
GSV Moers	0 – 9	Grün-Weiß Brauweiler
DJK Arminia Ibbenbüren	0 – 10	FC Rumeln-Kaldenhausen
TV Jahn Delmenhorst	1 – 6	Turbine Potsdam
Turbine Potsdam II	0 – 4	WSV Wolfsburg
Hertha Zehlendorf	2 – 0^{*}	Fortuna Sachsenroß Hannover
Polizei SV Bremen	0 – 2	Tennis Borussia Berlin
Nagema Neubrandenburg	0 – 9	SSV Schmalfeld
TuS Wörrstadt	0 – 3	TuS Niederkirchen
SC Siegelbach	1 – 4	VfR Saarbrücken
Sportfreunde Siegen	3 – 1	TuS Ahrbach
VfR Gießen	0 – 4	SC Sand
TSV Ludwigsburg	0 – 1	FSV DJK Schwarzbach
FV Löchgau	0 – 15	FSV Frankfurt
Wacker München	0 – 12	SG Praunheim
TSV Crailsheim	1 – 4	VfL Sindelfingen

^{*} Hertha Zehlendorf was disqualified for fielding Ariane Hingst who was not eligible to play.

== Third round ==
VfL Sindelfingen	4 – 1	SC Sand
Eintracht Rheine	4 – 1	Fortuna Sachsenroß Hannover
WSV Wolfsburg	0 – 5	Grün-Weiß Brauweiler
Sportfreunde Siegen	2 – 1	SG Praunheim	(aet)
FSV Frankfurt	3 – 0	TuS Niederkirchen	(aet)
VfR Saarbrücken	1 – 3	FC Rumeln-Kaldenhausen
Turbine Potsdam	7 – 3	Tennis Borussia Berlin
SSV Schmalfeld	1 – 0	FSV DJK Schwarzbach

== Quarter-finals ==
VfL Sindelfingen	1 – 4	Grün-Weiß Brauweiler
FC Rumeln-Kaldenhausen	2 – 0	Sportfreunde Siegen
SSV Schmalfeld	0 – 6	Turbine Potsdam
Eintracht Rheine	2 – 2	FSV Frankfurt	(4–2 on penalties)

== Semi-finals ==
Turbine Potsdam	2 – 3	Eintracht Rheine
Grün-Weiß Brauweiler	4 – 3	FC Rumeln-Kaldenhausen	(aet)

== Final ==
14 June 1997

Grün-Weiß Brauweiler	3 – 1	Eintracht Rheine
Klein 43'; Fuss 63'; Holinka 77'		Unterbrink 76'

Olympic Stadium (Berlin)
Attendance: 30,000
Referee: Christel Zdunek (Leimen)

SV GRÜN-WEISS BRAUWEILER:
GK	1	(Germany) Manuela Goller
DF		(Germany) Claudia Klein
DF		(Germany) Natascha Schwind
DF		(Germany) Ursula Gertheinrich
MF		(Germany) Andrea Klein
MF		(Germany) Carmen Lieth	(substituted off) 67'
MF		(Germany) Sonja Fuss
MF		(Germany) Bettina Wiegmann	(substituted off) 88'
MF		(Germany) Nicoel Brandebusemeyer
FW		(Germany) Gudrun Gottschlich
FW		(Germany) Carmen Holinka
Substitutes:
MF		(Germany) Patricia Menge	(substituted on) 67'
MF		(Germany) Sonja Bleibler	(substituted on) 88'

FC EINTRACHT RHEINE:
GK	1	(Germany) Ricarda Steininger
DF		(Germany) Iris Flacke
DF		(Germany) Nicole Erhardt
DF		(Germany) Petra Unterbrink
MF		(Germany) Kerstin Stegemann
MF		(Germany) Monika Denker
MF		(Germany) Melanie Schmacher	(substituted off) 75'
MF		(Germany) Manuela Schlamann
MF		(Germany) Nicole Werner	(substituted off) 58'
FW		(Germany) Anja Siegers
FW		(Germany) Maria Reisinger
Substitutes:
MF		(Germany) Sandra Reisinger	(substituted on) 75'
MF		(Germany) Marcia Merchant	(substituted on) 58'

== See also ==
- Bundesliga 1996–97
- 1996–97 DFB-Pokal men's competition
