= 1997–98 DFB-Pokal Frauen =

Tournament details
- Country: Germany
- Teams: 44

Final positions
- Champions: FCR Duisburg
- Runners-up: FSV Frankfurt

Tournament statistics
- Matches played: 43

The Frauen DFB-Pokal 1997–98 was the 18th season of the cup competition, Germany's second-most important title in women's football. In the final which was held in Berlin on 16 June 1998 FCR Duisburg defeated FSV Frankfurt 6–2, thus winning their first cup title. Duisburg had begun the season as FC Rumeln-Kaldenhausen, changing their name in midseason to FCR Duisburg.

== First round ==
Several clubs had byes in the first round and were automatically qualified for the second round.

Nagema Neubrandenburg	6 – 1	Fortuna Sachsenroß Hannover
Wittenseer SV	0 – 4	Turbine Potsdam
Wolfenbütteler SV	4 – 3	SSV Schmalfeld
Hertha Zehlendorf	2 – 1	Turbine Potsdam II
Wacker Merkenich	0 – 17	Sportfreunde Siegen
Fortuna Dilkrath	1 – 9	FCR Duisburg
Polizei SV Bremen	0 – 4	TV Jahn Delmenhorst
SC Bulach	1 – 4	SC Klinge Seckach
VfL Sindelfingen	1 – 12	TuS Niederkirchen
Fortuna Dresden/Rähnitz	1 – 9	FSV Frankfurt
FSV DJK Schwarzbach	0 – 8	SG Praunheim
TSV Crailsheim	12 – 0	TSV Eschollbrücken

== Second round ==
SpVgg Rehweiler	0 – 14	1. FC Saarbrücken
TSV Ludwigsburg	2 – 3	SC Klinge Seckach	(aet)
SC Freiburg	0 – 1	TuS Niederkirchen
SV Dirmingen	0 – 1	Eintracht Seekirch
TuS Linter	1 – 7	FSV Frankfurt
FC Rennersthofen	0 – 7	SG Praunheim
TSV Crailsheim	4 – 1	FF USV Jena
Nagema Neubrandenburg	0 – 4	Turbine Potsdam
Tennis Borussia Berlin	2 – 0	Hamburg
WSV Wolfsburg	3 – 5	Hertha Zehlendorf
Wolfenbütteler SV	6 – 0	Fortuna Magdeburg
GSV Moers	0 – 10	Sportfreunde Siegen
Wattenscheid 09	0 – 5	FCR Duisburg
TV Jahn Delmenhorst	0 – 2	SC 07 Bad Neuenahr
SpVgg Oberaußem-Fortuna	0 – 7	Grün-Weiß Brauweiler
Arminia Ibbenbüren	0 – 1	Eintracht Rheine

== Third round ==
Grün-Weiß Brauweiler	3 – 5	FSV Frankfurt
SC 07 Bad Neuenahr	3 – 0	Eintracht Seekirch
Wolfenbütteler SV	0 – 5	FCR Duisburg
Turbine Potsdam	0 – 1	Sportfreunde Siegen	(aet)
SG Praunheim	1 – 0	Hertha Zehlendorf
Tennis Borussia Berlin	0 – 3	TuS Niederkirchen
SC Klinge Seckach	0 – 4	Eintracht Rheine
TSV Crailsheim	0 – 2	1. FC Saarbrücken

== Quarter-finals ==
SG Praunheim	0 – 1	FSV Frankfurt
FCR Duisburg	2 – 0	Eintracht Rheine
1. FC Saarbrücken	0 – 3	Sportfreunde Siegen
TuS Niederkirchen	3 – 0	SC 07 Bad Neuenahr

== Semi-finals ==
FCR Duisburg	1 – 0	TuS Niederkirchen
Sportfreunde Siegen	2 – 3	FSV Frankfurt	(aet)

== Final ==
16 June 1998

FCR Duisburg	6 – 2	FSV Frankfurt
Grings 4' 48' 90'; Nieczypor 7' 30'; Meinert 18'		König-Vialkowitsch 42'; Bornschein 52'

Olympic Stadium (Berlin)
Attendance: 35,000
Referee: Antje Witteweg (Goslar)

FC RUMELN DUISBURG 55:
GK	1	(Germany) Ursula McKnight
DF		(Germany) Melanie Hoffmann
DF		(Germany) Claudia Mandrysch
DF		(Germany) Jutta Nardenbach
MF		(Germany) Meike Fitzner
MF		(Germany) Daniela Arndt
MF		(Germany) Maren Meinert	(substituted off) 70'
MF		(Germany) Martina Voss
MF		(Germany) Sandra Albertz
MF		(Poland) Jolanta Nieczypor	(substituted off) 87'
FW		(Germany) Inka Grings
Substitutes:
MF		(Germany) Michaela Kubat	(substituted on) 70'
FW		(Germany) Christa Schäpertöns	(substituted on) 87'

FSV FRANKFURT:
GK	1	(Germany) Katja Kraus
DF		(Germany) Steffi Jones	(substituted off) 87'
DF		(Germany) Jasmin Krämer	(substituted off) 46'
DF		(Germany) Sandra Minnert
MF		(Germany) Daniela Stumpf
MF		(Germany) Anouschka Bernhard
MF		(Germany) Gaby König-Vialkowitsch
MF		(Germany) Sandra Smisek
MF		(Germany) Wenke Häusler
FW		(Germany) Birgit Prinz
FW		(Germany) Katja Bornschein
Substitutes:
DF		(Germany) Jennifer Meier	(substituted on) 87'
MF		(Germany) Martina Walter	(substituted on) 46'

== See also ==
- Bundesliga 1997–98
- 1997–98 DFB-Pokal men's competition
