= 1996–97 Frauen-Bundesliga =

Frauen-Bundesliga
- Season: 1996–97
- Champions: Grün-Weiß Brauweiler; 1st Bundesliga title 1st German title
- Relegated: TuS Ahrbach; Tennis Borussia Berlin; VfL Sindelfingen; VfL Wittekind Wildeshausen
- Top goalscorer: (Germany) Birgit Prinz (20)

The 1996–97 Frauen-Bundesliga was the seventh season of the Frauen-Bundesliga, Germany's premier football league. It was the last season, in which the first league was divided into two divisions. Beginning with the 1997–98 season all Bundesliga teams played in a single division. As the new uniform league had eight spaces less than the divided Bundesliga, eight teams had to play in the qualification with the champions of the Regionalligas.

In the final the leaders of the northern division met. Grün-Weiß Brauweiler defeated FC Rumeln-Kaldenhausen 4–3 on penalties. Previously the regular time had ended goalless. In the extra time Rumeln-Kaldenhausen had taken an early lead, but Brauweiler had equalized late in the game. It was Brauweiler's only championship.

== Northern division ==
=== Final standings ===
Pos	Team	Pld	W	D	L	GF	GA	GD	Pts	Qualification or relegation
1	Grün-Weiß Brauweiler	18	15	2	1	59	12	+47	47	Participant of the semi-final
2	FC Rumeln-Kaldenhausen	18	15	1	2	60	12	+48	46	Participant of the semi-final
3	Sportfreunde Siegen (Note: 1995–96 Bundesliga champion)	18	13	1	4	52	15	+37	40	
4	Eintracht Rheine	18	9	4	5	30	24	+6	31	
5	Turbine Potsdam	18	8	3	7	32	29	+3	27	Had to play qualification for next Bundesliga season
6	Fortuna Sachsenroß Hannover	18	4	4	10	24	45	−21	16	Had to play qualification for next Bundesliga season
7	Schmalfelder SV (Note: Promoted from the Regionalliga previous season)	18	3	4	11	16	38	−22	13	Had to play qualification for next Bundesliga season
8	WSV Wolfsburg	18	3	4	11	15	39	−24	13	Had to play qualification for next Bundesliga season
9	VfL Wittekind Wildeshausen	18	3	3	12	10	49	−39	12	Relegated to Regional-/Oberliga
10	Tennis Borussia Berlin	18	1	6	11	11	46	−35	9	Relegated to Regional-/Oberliga

=== Results ===
Home \ Away	GWB	RUK	SFS	HRH	POT	FSH	SCH	WSV	WIW	TBB
Grün-Weiß Brauweiler		1–0	1–2	5–2	0–0	2–0	6–0	0–0	8–0	2–0
FC Rumeln-Kaldenhausen	4–5		2–1	1–0	4–1	3–0	2–0	6–0	6–0	7–0
Sportfreunde Siegen	0–1	0–3		0–0	2–2	6–1	2–0	6–1	6–0	9–0
FC Eintracht Rheine	0–5	1–1	0–2		0–1	4–0	2–2	3–0	1–0	3–0
Turbine Potsdam	1–5	2–3	1–2	2–3		2–1	2–0	3–0	0–2	3–1
Fortuna Sachsenroß Hannover	1–6	0–3	1–5	2–2	2–4		2–1	2–0	1–2	3–3
Schmalfelder SV	0–2	1–4	0–3	1–3	2–1	0–3		1–1	2–0	1–1
WSV Wolfsburg	0–2	0–3	1–3	1–2	2–2	1–1	4–3		3–0	1–0
VfL Wittekind Wildeshausen	1–3	1–6	0–1	0–2	0–4	1–4	0–0	1–0		2–2
Tennis Borussia Berlin	1–5	0–3	0–2	1–1	1–2	0–0	0–2	1–0	0–0	

Legend: Blue = home team win; Yellow = draw; Red = away team win.

== Southern division ==
=== Final standings ===
Pos	Team	Pld	W	D	L	GF	GA	GD	Pts	Qualification or relegation
1	FSV Frankfurt	18	17	1	0	76	6	+70	52	Participant of the semi-final
2	SG Praunheim	18	12	2	4	45	11	+34	38	Participant of the semi-final
3	TuS Niederkirchen	18	8	5	5	36	30	+6	29	
4	VfR 09 Saarbrücken	18	8	4	6	27	29	−2	28	
5	TSV Crailsheim	18	6	4	8	23	24	−1	22	Had to play qualification for next Bundesliga season
6	SC Sand (Note: Promoted from the Regionalliga previous season)	18	6	4	8	24	41	−17	22	Had to play qualification for next Bundesliga season
7	Klinge Seckach	18	5	5	8	27	33	−6	20	Had to play qualification for next Bundesliga season
8	FSV Schwarzbach	18	5	3	10	16	44	−28	18	Had to play qualification for next Bundesliga season
9	VfL Sindelfingen	18	4	4	10	22	39	−17	16	Relegated to Regional-/Oberliga
10	TuS Ahrbach	18	1	4	13	16	55	−39	7	Relegated to Regional-/Oberliga

=== Results ===
Home \ Away	FSV	SGP	NIE	SAR	CRA	SCS	KLS	SBA	SIN	AHR
FSV Frankfurt		1–0	8–0	1–0	1–0	6–2	6–1	6–0	6–0	10–0
SG Praunheim	1–2		1–1	7–1	3–0	5–0	2–0	4–0	3–0	4–0
TuS Niederkirchen	1–4	0–0		2–2	1–4	5–2	3–1	4–1	4–0	1–1
VfR 09 Saarbrücken	0–1	1–0	1–3		3–2	3–1	0–3	3–1	3–0	1–1
TSV Crailsheim	1–4	2–1	0–1	0–0		1–1	0–0	1–1	3–1	1–2
SC Sand	0–5	0–6	1–0	0–1	1–0		2–0	1–1	1–1	4–2
Klinge Seckach	0–7	1–2	0–0	2–2	3–1	2–1		5–0	1–2	5–1
FSV Schwarzbach	0–6	0–2	1–0	0–2	1–3	1–1	1–0		3–2	3–1
VfL Sindelfingen	0–0	1–2	2–3	3–0	0–3	1–4	1–1	3–1		4–0
TuS Ahrbach	0–2	1–2	1–7	2–4	0–1	1–2	2–2	0–1	1–1	

Legend: Blue = home team win; Yellow = draw; Red = away team win.

== Semi-finals ==
Match		1st leg	2nd leg	Agg.
SG Praunheim	Grün-Weiß Brauweiler	2–4	1–1	3 – 5
FSV Frankfurt	FC Rumeln-Kaldenhausen	2–1	1–3	3 – 4

== Final ==
FC Rumeln-Kaldenhausen	Grün-Weiß Brauweiler
8 June 1997; Duisburg-Homberg; Spectators: 5,000; Referee: Elke Günther (Bamberg)
Sesek – Melanie Hoffmann – Claudia Mandrysch, Nicole Ferber – Puls (Ellen van Bergen 62), Martina Voss, Jutta Nardenbach, Maren Meinert, Sandra Albertz (Daniela Arndt 105) – Inka Grings, Jolanta Nieczypor	Manuela Goller – Claudia Klein – Urusla Gertheinrich, Natascha Schwind (Carmen Lieth 46) – Andrea Klein, Sonja Fuss, Tünde Nagy (Vidmar 80), Bettina Wiegmann, Nicole Brandebusemeyer (Patricia Menge 77) – Gudrun Gottschlich, Carmen Holinka
1–0 Grings (91)	1–1 Menge (117)
Penalty Shootout
2–2 Meinert 3–3 Hoffmann 4–4 Mandrysch Arndt (missed)	1–2 Wiegmann 2–3 Vidmar 3–4 Klein 4–5 Gertheinrich 4–5 Klein

== Top scorers ==
Rank	Player	Team	Goals
1	(Germany) Birgit Prinz	FSV Frankfurt	20

== Qualification ==
=== Group 1 ===
Pos	Team	Pld	W	D	L	GF	GA	GD	Pts	Promotion
1	Turbine Potsdam	6	4	2	0	17	3	+14	14	Qualified for the Bundesliga 1997–98
2	Wattenscheid 09	6	3	1	2	9	7	+2	10	
3	WSV Wolfsburg	6	2	2	2	9	11	−2	8	
4	Hertha Zehlendorf	6	0	1	5	7	21	−14	1	

=== Group 2 ===
Pos	Team	Pld	W	D	L	GF	GA	GD	Pts	Promotion
1	Fortuna Sachsenroß Hannover (Note: Fortuna Sachsenroß declined for financial reasons. Hamburg thus took their place in the Bundesliga.)	6	4	2	0	14	6	+8	14	
2	Hamburg	6	2	2	2	8	9	−1	8	Qualified for the Bundesliga 1997–98
3	Schmalfelder SV	6	2	1	3	11	9	+2	7	
4	TV Jahn Delmenhorst	6	1	1	4	6	15	−9	4	

=== Group 3 ===
Pos	Team	Pld	W	D	L	GF	GA	GD	Pts	Promotion
1	SC 07 Bad Neuenahr(A)	6	5	0	1	18	8	+10	15	Qualified for the Bundesliga 1997–98
2	TSV Crailsheim	6	4	0	2	14	10	+4	12	
3	FSV Schwarzbach	6	2	0	4	11	14	−3	6	
4	SC Freiburg	6	1	0	5	9	20	−11	3	

=== Group 4 ===
Pos	Team	Pld	W	D	L	GF	GA	GD	Pts	Promotion
1	Klinge Seckach	6	5	1	0	20	2	+18	16	Qualified for the Bundesliga 1997–98
2	SC Sand	6	3	1	2	9	9	0	10	
3	TSV Jahn Calden	6	2	2	2	11	12	−1	8	
4	Wacker München	6	0	0	6	2	19	−17	0	

== Sources ==
- "West Germany (Women) 1996/97". Rec.Sport.Soccer Statistics Foundation. 15 January 2005. Retrieved 2009-07-22.
