= 1990–91 DFB-Pokal Frauen =

Tournament details
- Country: Germany
- Teams: 16

Final positions
- Champions: FSV Frankfurt
- Runners-up: TSV Siegen

Tournament statistics
- Matches played: 17
- Goals scored: 54 (3.18 per match)

The Frauen DFB-Pokal 1990–91 was the 11th season of the cup competition, Germany's second-most important title in women's football. In the final which was held in Berlin on 22 June 1991 Grün-Weiß Brauweiler defeated TSV Siegen 1–0.

== Participants ==
Northern region	Western region	Southwestern region	Southern region	Berlin
Bremen: Polizei SV Bremen; Hamburg: FTSV Lorbeer Rothenburgsort; Lower Saxony: VfR Eintracht Wolfsburg; Schleswig-Holstein: Schmalfelder SV	Middle Rhine: Grün-Weiß Brauweiler; Lower Rhine: GSV Moers; Westphalia: TSV Siegen	Rhineland: TuS Ahrbach; Saarland: VfR 09 Saarbrücken; Southwest: TuS Wörrstadt	Baden Klinge Seckach; Bavaria Bayern Munich; Hesse: FSV Frankfurt; South Baden: TuS Binzen; Württemberg: VfL Sindelfingen	Berlin: Tennis Borussia Berlin

== First round ==
TuS Binzen	0 – 2	Klinge Seckach
Tennis Borussia Berlin	1 – 4	VfR Eintracht Wolfsburg
Grün-Weiß Brauweiler	1 – 0	FSV Frankfurt
TSV Siegen	6 – 0	SV Lorbeer Rothenburgsort
TuS Ahrbach	0 – 1	VfR 09 Saarbrücken
Schmalfelder SV	0 – 1	VfL Sindelfingen	(aet)
GSV Moers	3 – 0	Polizei SV Bremen
TuS Wörrstadt	2 – 2	Bayern Munich	(aet)

=== Replay ===
Bayern Munich	4 – 0	TuS Wörrstadt

== Quarter-finals ==
GSV Moers	1 – 2	VfR Eintracht Wolfsburg
Grün-Weiß Brauweiler	1 – 1	Klinge Seckach
Bayern Munich	1 – 0	VfL Sindelfingen
VfR 09 Saarbrücken	1 – 5	TSV Siegen

=== Replay ===
Klinge Seckach	1 – 5	Grün-Weiß Brauweiler

== Semi-finals ==
TSV Siegen	2 – 0	Bayern Munich
Grün-Weiß Brauweiler	6 – 0	VfR Eintracht Wolfsburg

== Final ==
22 June 1991

Grün-Weiß Brauweiler	1 – 0	TSV Siegen
Kubat 19'

Olympic Stadium (Berlin)
Attendance: 10,000
Referee: Rainer Boos (Friedrichsdorf)

GRÜN-WEISS BRAUWEILER:
GK	1	(Germany) Silke Rottenberg
DF	(Germany) Claudia Klein
DF	(Germany) Andrea Klein
DF	(Germany) Gabriele Walek
DMF	Perner-Wrobel	(substituted off) 41'
DMF	(Germany) Bettina Wiegmann
DMF	(Hungary) Gyöngyi Lovász-Anton
OMF	(Germany) Dunja Fischer	(substituted off) 80'
OMF	Richter
FW	(Germany) Michaela Kubat
FW	(Germany) Ursula Lohn
Substitutes:
MF	(Hungary) Annamária Agócs	(substituted on) 41'
FW	Haberkorn	(substituted on) 80'
Manager:
(Germany) Thomas Meyer

TSV SIEGEN:
GK	1	(Germany) Marion Isbert
DF	(Germany) Birgit Wiese
DF	(Netherlands) Marjan Veldhuizen	Booked
DF	(Germany) Jutta Nardenbach
MF	(Germany) Martina Voss
MF	(Germany) Silvia Neid
MF	(Germany) Sissy Raith	(substituted off) 59'
MF	(Germany) Myriam Knieper
MF	(Netherlands) Loes Camper
FW	(Germany) Gaby Mink	(substituted off) 63'
FW	(Hungary) Edit Kern
Substitutes:
Heike Czyganowski	(substituted on) 59'
(Germany) Beate Henkel	(substituted on) 63'
Manager:
(Germany) Gerhard Neuser

== See also ==
- Bundesliga 1990–91
- 1990–91 DFB-Pokal men's competition
