= 2019–20 SC Paderborn 07 season =

SC Paderborn
2019–20 season
- Chairman: Elmar Volkmann
- Head coach: Steffen Baumgart
- Stadium: Benteler-Arena
- Bundesliga: 18th (relegated)
- DFB-Pokal: Second round
- Top goalscorer: League: Streli Mamba (5); All: Streli Mamba (6)
Home colours	Away colours	Third colours

The 2019–20 season was SC Paderborn's 35th season in existence and the club's 1st season back in the top flight of German football. In addition to the domestic league, SC Paderborn participated in this season's edition of the DFB-Pokal. The season covered the period from 1 July 2019 to 30 June 2020.

== Players ==
=== Current squad ===
As of 18 January 2020

Note: Flags indicate national team as defined under FIFA eligibility rules; some limited exceptions apply. Players may hold more than one non-FIFA nationality.

No.	Pos.	Nation	Player
1	GK	GER	Michael Ratajczak
2	DF	GER	Uwe Hünemeier (vice-captain)
4	DF	GER	Jan-Luca Rumpf
5	DF	GER	Christian Strohdiek (captain)
6	MF	ISL	Samúel Friðjónsson
7	MF	GER	Marlon Ritter
8	MF	ALB	Klaus Gjasula (3rd captain)
9	MF	GER	Kai Pröger
11	FW	GER	Sven Michel
12	MF	CRO	Dominik Bilogrević
13	DF	GER	Sebastian Schonlau
14	MF	GER	Adrian Oeynhausen
15	DF	GER	Luca Kilian
16	MF	GER	Johannes Dörfler
17	GK	GER	Leopold Zingerle

No.	Pos.	Nation	Player
18	FW	GER	Dennis Srbeny
19	MF	GER	Abdelhamid Sabiri
20	DF	LUX	Laurent Jans (on loan from FC Metz)
21	GK	GER	Jannik Huth
22	MF	GHA	Christopher Antwi-Adjei
24	MF	BIH	Rifet Kapić
25	DF	TUN	Mohamed Dräger (on loan from SC Freiburg)
27	FW	SEN	Babacar Guèye
29	DF	NGR	Jamilu Collins
30	FW	GER	Streli Mamba
31	FW	GER	Ben Zolinski
33	MF	GER	Marcel Hilßner
34	GK	GER	Leon Brüggemeier
38	MF	GER	Gerrit Holtmann (on loan from Mainz)
39	MF	GRE	Sebastian Vasiliadis

=== Players out of team ===
Note: Flags indicate national team as defined under FIFA eligibility rules; some limited exceptions apply. Players may hold more than one non-FIFA nationality.

No.	Pos.	Nation	Player
—	MF	CAN	Massih Wassey

=== Players out on loan ===
Note: Flags indicate national team as defined under FIFA eligibility rules; some limited exceptions apply. Players may hold more than one non-FIFA nationality.

No.	Pos.	Nation	Player
—	MF	GER	Ron Schallenberg (at SC Verl until 30 June 2020)
—	FW	TUR	Sergio Gucciardo (at SV Lippstadt 08 until 30 June 2020)
—	FW	GER	Felix Drinkuth (at Hallescher FC until 30 June 2020)

== Pre-season and friendlies ==
Win Draw Loss

6 July 2019 Friendly	SC Paderborn	3–2	Ipswich Town	Delbrück, Germany
15:00 CEST (UTC+2)	Pröger 8'; Guèye 18', 34'	Report	Roberts 36'; Jackson 76' (pen.)	Stadium: AM-Stadion; Attendance: 1,000

10 July 2019 Friendly	SC Verl	2–2	SC Paderborn	Verl, Germany
18:00 CEST (UTC+2)	Kurth 3'; Heinz 74'	Report	Dörfler 41'; Mamba 60'	Stadium: SPORTCLUB Arena; Attendance: 1,024

12 July 2019 Friendly	Delbrücker SC	0–7	SC Paderborn	Delbrück, Germany
18:30 CEST (UTC+2)		Report	Zolinski 14', 31'; Ritter 45', 66'; Mamba 46'; Shelton 49', 80'	Stadium: Stadion Laumeskamp; Attendance: 1,683

16 July 2019 Friendly	Eintracht Northeim	1–4	SC Paderborn	Northeim, Germany
18:30 CEST (UTC+2)	Bode 7'	Report	Mamba 22'; Shelton 26'; Guèye 49', 67'	Stadium: Gustav-Wegner-Stadion; Attendance: 902

27 July 2019 Friendly	SC Paderborn	3–3	Athletic Bilbao	Gütersloh, Germany
17:00 CEST (UTC+2)	Zolinski 15'; Vasiliadis 34'; Antwi-Adjei 56'	Report	Larrazabal 1'; Córdoba 74'; Muniain 85'	Stadium: Heidewaldstadion; Referee: Roman Piechota

3 August 2019 Friendly	SC Paderborn	2–4	Lazio	Paderborn, Germany
16:00 CEST (UTC+2)	Antwi-Adjei 67'; Cauly 88'	Report	Caicedo 19'; Cataldi 33'; Jans 42' (o.g.); Lulić 89'	Stadium: Benteler-Arena; Attendance: 5,809; Referee: Sven Watsdritzki

9 October 2019 Friendly	Brakel	2–0	SC Paderborn	Brakel, Germany
18:30 CEST (UTC+2)	Fähnrich 31'; Fofana 90'	Report		Stadium: Thermo-Glass Stadium

4 January 2020 Friendly	SC Paderborn	4–1	Sportfreunde Lotte	Paderborn, Germany
13:00 CET (UTC+1)	Hünemeier 32'; Zolinski 43'; Pröger 59'; Antwi-Adjei 78'	Report	Jagupov 36'	Stadium: Benteler-Arena

8 January 2020 Friendly	SC Paderborn	4–3	VfL Osnabrück	Paderborn, Germany
14:00 CET (UTC+1)	Pröger 14'; Sabiri 21'; Kapić 30'; Antwi-Adjei 32'	Report	Van Aken 72'; Ouahim 79', 85'	Stadium: Benteler-Arena

11 January 2020 Friendly	Hannover 96	0–1	SC Paderborn	Hanover, Germany
13:00 CET (UTC+1)	Felipe (yellow card) 63'	Report	Srbeny (yellow card) 17'; Pröger 33'	Stadium: Eilenriedestadion

== Competitions ==
Win Draw Loss

=== Overview ===
Competition	First match	Last match	Starting round	Final position	Record							
Competition	First match	Last match	Starting round	Final position	Pld	W	D	L	GF	GA	GD	Win %
Bundesliga	17 August 2019	27 June 2020	Matchday 1	18th	34	4	8	22	37	74	−37	11.76
DFB-Pokal	11 August 2019	29 October 2019	First round	Second round	2	0	1	1	3	4	−1	0.00
Total					36	4	9	23	40	78	−38	11.11

Last updated: 27 June 2020
Source: Soccerway

=== Bundesliga ===
==== League table ====
Pos	Team	Pld	W	D	L	GF	GA	GD	Pts	Qualification or relegation
14	1. FC Köln	34	10	6	18	51	69	−18	36	
15	FC Augsburg	34	9	9	16	45	63	−18	36	
16	Werder Bremen (O)	34	8	7	19	42	69	−27	31	Qualification for the relegation play-offs
17	Fortuna Düsseldorf (R)	34	6	12	16	36	67	−31	30	Relegation to 2. Bundesliga
18	SC Paderborn (R)	34	4	8	22	37	74	−37	20	Relegation to 2. Bundesliga

Source: DFB
Rules for classification: 1) Points; 2) Goal difference; 3) Goals scored; 4) Head-to-head results; 5) Head-to-head away goals scored; 6) Away goals scored; 7) Play-off.
(O) Play-off winners; (R) Relegated

==== Results summary ====
Overall								Home						Away					
Pld	W	D	L	GF	GA	GD	Pts	W	D	L	GF	GA	GD	W	D	L	GF	GA	GD
34	4	8	22	37	74	−37	20	2	2	13	22	46	−24	2	6	9	15	28	−13

Last updated: 27 June 2020.
Source: Bundesliga

==== Results by round ====
Round	1	2	3	4	5	6	7	8	9	10	11	12	13	14	15	16	17	18	19	20	21	22	23	24	25	26	27	28	29	30	31	32	33	34
Ground	A	H	A	H	A	H	H	A	H	A	H	A	H	A	H	A	H	H	A	H	A	H	A	A	H	A	H	A	H	A	H	A	H	A
Result	L	L	D	L	L	L	L	L	W	L	L	D	L	W	D	L	W	L	W	L	D	L	L	L	L	D	D	D	L	D	L	L	L	L
Position	12	15	15	17	18	18	18	18	18	18	18	18	18	17	18	18	18	18	17	18	18	18	18	18	18	18	18	18	18	18	18	18	18	18

Updated to match(es) played on 27 June 2020. Source: Bundesliga
A = Away; H = Home; W = Win; D = Draw; L = Loss

==== Matches ====
The Bundesliga schedule was announced on 28 June 2019.

17 August 2019 1	Bayer Leverkusen	3–2	SC Paderborn	Leverkusen
15:30 CEST (UTC+2)	Bailey 10'; Havertz 19'; Wendell (yellow card) 25'; Dragović (yellow card) 62'; Volland 69'	Report	Michel 15'; Mamba 25'	Stadium: BayArena; Attendance: 26,208; Referee: Tobias Stieler

24 August 2019 2	SC Paderborn	1–3	SC Freiburg	Paderborn
15:30 CEST (UTC+2)	Mamba 3'; Hünemeier (yellow card) 42'; Vasiliadis (yellow card) 63'; Gjasula (yellow card) 67'	Report	Waldschmidt 21' (pen.); Petersen 40'; Gondorf (yellow card) 45'; Kwon Chang-hoon 90'	Stadium: Benteler-Arena; Attendance: 14,322; Referee: Tobias Welz

31 August 2019 3	VfL Wolfsburg	1–1	SC Paderborn	Wolfsburg
15:30 CEST (UTC+2)	Brekalo 56'	Report	Cauly 12'; Hünemeier (yellow card) 63'; Holtmann (yellow card) 88'; Ggasula (yellow card) 90+6'	Stadium: Volkswagen Arena; Attendance: 23,750; Referee: Daniel Schlager

15 September 2019 4	SC Paderborn	1–5	Schalke 04	Paderborn
18:00 CEST (UTC+2)	Cauly 8'; Michel (yellow card) 41'; Gjasula (yellow card) 73'	Report	Sané 33'; Kenny (yellow card) 38'; Serdar 49'; Harit 71', 85'; Kutucu 83'	Stadium: Benteler-Arena; Attendance: 15,000; Referee: Robert Schröder

21 September 2019 5	Hertha BSC	2–1	SC Paderborn	Berlin
15:30 CEST (UTC+2)	Dilrosun 10', (yellow card) 90+4'; Selke (yellow card) 45+1'; Wolf 52'; Klünter (yellow card) 82'; Ibišević (yellow card) 90+3'	Report	Gjasula (yellow card) 45+1'; Strohdiek (yellow card) 50'; Zolinski 54'; Vasiliadis (yellow card) 76'; Ritter (yellow card) 90+3'	Stadium: Olympiastadion; Attendance: 43,588; Referee: Frank Willenborg

28 September 2019 6	SC Paderborn	2–3	Bayern Munich	Paderborn
15:30 CEST (UTC+2)	Pröger 68'; Collins 84'	Report	Gnabry 15'; Süle (yellow card) 43'; Coutinho 55'; Lewandowski 79'	Stadium: Benteler-Arena; Attendance: 15,000; Referee: Felix Zwayer

5 October 2019 7	SC Paderborn	1–2	Mainz 05	Paderborn
15:30 CEST (UTC+2)	Zolinski 14'; Ritter (yellow card) 67'	Report	Quaison 8'; Niakhaté (yellow card) 25'; Brosinski 32' (pen.); Baku (yellow card) 35'; Öztunalı (yellow card) 70'; Fernandes (yellow card) 83'	Stadium: Benteler-Arena; Attendance: 14,217; Referee: Patrick Ittrich

20 October 2019 8	1. FC Köln	3–0	SC Paderborn	Cologne
15:30 CEST (UTC+2)	Terodde 8'; Schaub 59'; Bornauw 85'	Report		Stadium: RheinEnergieStadion; Attendance: 50,000; Referee: Manuel Gräfe

26 October 2019 9	SC Paderborn	2–0	Fortuna Düsseldorf	Paderborn
15:30 CEST (UTC+2)	Sabiri (yellow card) 23', (goal) 43'; Gjasula (yellow card) 30'; Zolinski (yellow card) 57'; Schonlau 64'; Dräger (yellow card) 78'; Kilian (yellow card) 90+3'	Report	Zimmermann (yellow card) 22'; Kownacki (yellow card) 48'; Zimmer (yellow card) 52'; Morales (yellow card) 83'	Stadium: Benteler-Arena; Attendance: 14,182; Referee: Bastian Dankert

1 November 2019 10	1899 Hoffenheim	3–0	SC Paderborn	Hoffenheim
20:30 CET (UTC+1)	Skov 2'; Kadeřábek 15'; Locadia 25'	Report	Mamba (yellow card) 54'	Stadium: PreZero Arena; Attendance: 23,629; Referee: Robert Schröder

9 November 2019 11	SC Paderborn	0–1	FC Augsburg	Paderborn
15:30 CET (UTC+1)	Collins (yellow card) 84'	Report	Max 41', (yellow card) 90'; Jedvaj (yellow card) 67'; Morávek (yellow card) 88'	Stadium: Benteler-Arena; Attendance: 13,758; Referee: Marco Fritz

22 November 2019 12	Borussia Dortmund	3–3	SC Paderborn	Dortmund
20:30 CET (UTC+1)	Hummels (yellow card) 28'; Sancho 47'; Weigl (yellow card) 74'; Hakimi (yellow card) 84'; Witsel 84'; Reus 90+3'	Report	Mamba 5', 37'; Holtmann 43'; Collins (yellow card) 83'	Stadium: Signal Iduna Park; Attendance: 81,365; Referee: Christian Dingert

30 November 2019 13	SC Paderborn	2–3	RB Leipzig	Paderborn
15:30 CET (UTC+1)	Collins (yellow card) 33'; Mamba 62'; Gjasula 73', (yellow card) 90+3'; Antwi-Adjei (yellow card) 90+5'	Report	Schick 3', (yellow card) 74'; Sabitzer 4'; Werner 26', (yellow card) 90+3'; Ilsanker (yellow card) 44'	Stadium: Benteler-Arena; Attendance: 13,352; Referee: Bibiana Steinhaus

8 December 2019 14	Werder Bremen	0–1	SC Paderborn	Bremen
18:00 CET (UTC+1)	Gebre Selassie (yellow card) 84'	Report	Gjasula (yellow card) 31'; Mamba (yellow card) 41'; Vasiliadis (yellow card) 59'; Collins (yellow card) 84'; Michel 90'	Stadium: Weser-Stadion; Attendance: 39,870; Referee: Sascha Stegemann

14 December 2019 15	SC Paderborn	1–1	Union Berlin	Paderborn
15:30 CET (UTC+1)	Pröger 33'; Zolinski (yellow card) 82'; Gjasula (yellow card) 85'	Report	Ingvartsen 7', (yellow card) 20'; Parensen (yellow card) 36'; Trimmel (yellow card) 59'; Mees (yellow card) 72'	Stadium: Benteler-Arena; Attendance: 14,414; Referee: Sven Jablonski

18 December 2019 16	Borussia Mönchengladbach	2–0	SC Paderborn	Mönchengladbach
20:30 CET (UTC+1)	Jantschke (yellow card) 33'; Pléa 46'; Wendt (yellow card) 58'; Stindl 67' (pen.)	Report	Mamba (yellow card) 27'; Schonlau (yellow card) 66'; Vasiliadis (yellow card) 87'; Zolinski (yellow card) 87'	Stadium: Borussia-Park; Attendance: 44,494; Referee: Robert Kampka

22 December 2019 17	SC Paderborn	2–1	Eintracht Frankfurt	Paderborn
18:00 CET (UTC+1)	Sabiri 9', (yellow card) 81'; Schonlau 41'; Collins (yellow card) 83'; Michel (yellow card) 89'	Report	Fernandes (yellow card) 39'; Dost 72'	Stadium: Benteler-Arena; Attendance: 15,000; Referee: Markus Schmidt

19 January 2020 18	SC Paderborn	1–4	Bayer Leverkusen	Paderborn
18:00 CET (UTC+1)	Vasiliadis (yellow card) 22'; Gjasula (yellow card) 35'; Srbeny 51'; Sabiri (yellow card) 73'	Report	Volland 11', 14'; Baumgartlinger 36'; Havertz 75', (yellow card) 90'	Stadium: Benteler-Arena; Attendance: 14,889; Referee: Daniel Siebert

25 January 2020 19	SC Freiburg	0–2	SC Paderborn	Freiburg
15:30 CET (UTC+1)	Höler (yellow card) 31'; Haberer (yellow card) 83'; Heintz (yellow card) 85'; Waldschmidt (yellow card) 90'	Report	Gjasula (yellow card) 14'; Collins (yellow card) 29' (yellow-red card) 59'; Antwi-Adjei 48'; Baumgart (yellow card) 80'; Sabiri 84' (pen.)	Stadium: Schwarzwald-Stadion; Attendance: 23,500; Referee: Christian Dingert

2 February 2020 20	SC Paderborn	2–4	VfL Wolfsburg	Paderborn
18:00 CET (UTC+1)	Zolinski 22'; Holtmann (red card) 33'; Strohdiek (yellow card) 64'; Vasiliadis 72', (yellow card) 80'; Hünemeier (yellow card) 75'	Report	Guilavogui (yellow card) 10'; Knoche 26'; Steffen (yellow card) 33'; Ginczek 40', 60'; Pongračić (yellow card) 57'; Arnold 76'	Stadium: Benteler-Arena; Attendance: 13,926; Referee: Patrick Ittrich

8 February 2020 21	Schalke 04	1–1	SC Paderborn	Gelsenkirchen
15:30 CET (UTC+1)	Nastasić (yellow card) 53'; Kutucu 63'; Mascarell (yellow card) 72'	Report	Mamba (yellow card) 72'; Gjasula 81'; Jans (yellow card) 84'; Zingerle (yellow card) 90+1'	Stadium: Veltins-Arena; Attendance: 61,614; Referee: Felix Brych

15 February 2020 22	SC Paderborn	1–2	Hertha BSC	Paderborn
15:30 CET (UTC+1)	Srbeny 51'; Schonlau (yellow card) 66'; Collins (yellow card) 73'	Report	Boyata 10'; Stark (yellow card) 50'; Collins 67' (o.g.); Cunha (yellow card) 68'	Stadium: Benteler-Arena; Attendance: 14,687; Referee: Bibiana Steinhaus

21 February 2020 23	Bayern Munich	3–2	SC Paderborn	Munich
20:30 CET (UTC+1)	Gnabry 25'; Lucas (yellow card) 54'; Lewandowski 70', 88'	Report	Gjasula (yellow card) 34'; Srbeny 44'; Michel (yellow card) 61', (goal) 75'; Antwi-Adjei (yellow card) 84'	Stadium: Allianz Arena; Attendance: 75,000; Referee: Markus Schmidt

29 February 2020 24	Mainz 05	2–0	SC Paderborn	Mainz
15:30 CET (UTC+1)	Quaison 29'; Onisiwo (yellow card) 31', (goal) 37'	Report	Gjasula (yellow card) 41'; Vasiliadis (yellow card) 57'; Michel (yellow card) 90+2'	Stadium: Opel Arena; Attendance: 24,231; Referee: Harm Osmers

6 March 2020 25	SC Paderborn	1–2	1. FC Köln	Paderborn
20:00 CET (UTC+1)	Srbeny (yellow card) 34', (goal) 73'; Friðjónsson (yellow card) 63'; Sabiri (yellow card) 88'	Report	Meré 28', (yellow card) 86'; Hector 36'; Uth (yellow card) 79'; Rexhbecaj (yellow card) 80'; Skhiri (yellow card) 85'	Stadium: Benteler-Arena; Attendance: 15,000; Referee: Daniel Siebert

16 May 2020 26	Fortuna Düsseldorf	0–0	SC Paderborn	Düsseldorf
15:30 CEST (UTC+2)	Ayhan (yellow card) 24'; Karaman (yellow card) 48'	Report	Gjasula (yellow card) 31'; Hünemeier (yellow card) 90'	Stadium: Merkur Spiel-Arena; Attendance: 0 Referee: Frank Willenborg
Note: The match was postponed on 13 March due to the pandemic of COVID-19 in Germany, and rescheduled to 16 May.

23 May 2020 27	SC Paderborn	1–1	1899 Hoffenheim	Paderborn
15:30 CEST (UTC+2)	Srbeny 9', (yellow card) 67'; Vasiliadis (yellow card) 32'; Gjasula (yellow card) 61'	Report	Skov 4'	Stadium: Benteler-Arena; Attendance: 0 Referee: Bibiana Steinhaus
Note: The match was postponed on 13 March due to the pandemic of COVID-19 in Germany, and rescheduled to 23 May.

27 May 2020 28	FC Augsburg	0–0	SC Paderborn	Augsburg
20:30 CEST (UTC+2)	Gouweleeuw (yellow card) 84'	Report	Gjasula (yellow card) 52'	Stadium: WWK Arena; Attendance: 0 Referee: Deniz Aytekin
Note: The match was postponed on 24 March due to the pandemic of COVID-19 in Germany, and rescheduled to 27 May.

31 May 2020 29	SC Paderborn	1–6	Borussia Dortmund	Paderborn
18:00 CEST (UTC+2)	Collins (yellow card) 60'; Hünemeier 72' (pen.); Dräger (yellow card) 82'	Report	Hazard 54'; Sancho 57', 74', 90+1', (yellow card) 58'; Can (yellow card) 71'; Hummels (yellow card) 76'; Hakimi 85'; Schmelzer 89'	Stadium: Benteler-Arena; Attendance: 0 Referee: Daniel Siebert
Note: The match was postponed on 24 March due to the pandemic of COVID-19 in Germany, and rescheduled to 31 May.

6 June 2020 30	RB Leipzig	1–1	SC Paderborn	Leipzig
15:30 CEST (UTC+2)	Upamecano (yellow card) 16' (yellow-red card) 43'; Schick 27'	Report	Gjasula (yellow card) 22'; Hünemeier (yellow card) 28'; Mamba (yellow card) 43'; Strohdiek (yellow card) 63', (goal) 90+2'	Stadium: Red Bull Arena; Attendance: 0 Referee: Deniz Aytekin
Note: The match was postponed on 24 March due to the pandemic of COVID-19 in Germany, and rescheduled to 6 June.

13 June 2020 31	SC Paderborn	1–5	Werder Bremen	Paderborn
15:30 CEST (UTC+2)	Gjasula (yellow card) 32'; Jans (yellow card) 39'; Michel (yellow card) 63'; Sabiri 66', (yellow card) 82'; Zolinski (yellow card) 78'; Ritter (yellow card) 80'	Report	Augustinsson (yellow card) 15'; Klaassen 20', 39', (yellow card) 63'; Osako 34'; Eggestein 60'; Füllkrug (yellow card) 80', (goal) 90+2'	Stadium: Benteler-Arena; Attendance: 0 Referee: Christian Dingert
Note: The match was postponed on 24 March due to the pandemic of COVID-19 in Germany, and rescheduled to 13 June.

16 June 2020 32	Union Berlin	1–0	SC Paderborn	Berlin
20:30 CEST (UTC+2)	Zolinski 27' (o.g.); Prömel (yellow card) 50'	Report	Vasiliadis (yellow card) 53'	Stadium: Stadion An der Alten Försterei; Attendance: 0 Referee: Bibiana Steinhaus
Note: The match was postponed on 24 March due to the pandemic of COVID-19 in Germany, and rescheduled to 16 June.

20 June 2020 33	SC Paderborn	1–3	Borussia Mönchengladbach	Paderborn
15:30 CEST (UTC+2)	Sabiri (yellow card) 14'; Michel 54', (yellow card) 86'; Hünemeier (yellow card) 55' (yellow-red card) 66'	Report	Herrmann 4'; Bensebaini (yellow card) 42'; Jantschke (yellow card) 52'; Stindl 55' (pen.), 73'	Stadium: Benteler-Arena; Attendance: 0 Referee: Tobias Welz
Note: The match was postponed on 24 March due to the pandemic of COVID-19 in Germany, and rescheduled to 20 June.

27 June 2020 34	Eintracht Frankfurt	3–2	SC Paderborn	Frankfurt
15:30 CEST (UTC+2)	Rode 9'; Silva 33'; Dost 52'	Report	Dräger 55'; Michel (yellow card) 9', (goal) 75'	Stadium: Commerzbank-Arena; Attendance: 0 Referee: Benjamin Brand
Note: The match was postponed on 7 May due to the pandemic of COVID-19 in Germany, and rescheduled to 27 June.

=== DFB-Pokal ===
11 August 2019 First round	SV Rödinghausen	3–3 (a.e.t.) (2–4 p)	SC Paderborn	Rödinghausen
15:30 CEST (UTC+2)	Backszat (yellow card) 27'; Traoré (yellow card) 40'; Engelmann 53'; Lokotsch 79', 85', (yellow card) 85'; Kurzen (yellow card) 104'; Flottmann (yellow card) 110'	Report	Hünemeier 28'; Antwi-Adjei 43'; Mamba 73'; Holtmann (yellow card) 82'; Vasiliadis (yellow card) 86'; Gjasula (yellow card) 100'; Ratajczak (yellow card) 110'	Stadium: Häcker Wiehenstadion; Attendance: 2,236; Referee: Arne Aarnink
	Penalties
	Lokotsch (penalty missed); Backszat (penalty scored); Wolff (penalty scored); Steffen (penalty missed)		(penalty scored) Hünemeier; (penalty scored) Gjasula; (penalty scored) Collins; (penalty scored) Cauly

29 October 2019 Second round	Bayer Leverkusen	1–0	SC Paderborn	Leverkusen
20:45 CET (UTC+1)	Alario 26'; Weiser (yellow card) 70'	Report	Gjasula (yellow card) 40'	Stadium: BayArena; Attendance: 14,000; Referee: Sven Jablonski
