= 2018–19 MSV Duisburg season =

MSV Duisburg
2018–19 season
- Manager: Iliya Gruev (until 1 October); Torsten Lieberknecht (from 1 October)
- 2. Bundesliga: 18th
- DFB-Pokal: Third round
- Top goalscorer: League: Kevin Wolze (9); All: Kevin Wolze (9)
- Highest home attendance: 26,500 (vs Hamburg, 14 December 2018)
- Lowest home attendance: 11,096 (vs Regensburg, 29 September 2018)
- Average home league attendance: 15,385
Home colours	Away colours	Third colours

The 2018–19 MSV Duisburg season was the 119th season in the club's football history. In 2018–19 the club played in the 2. Bundesliga, the second tier of German football.

With a loss on 12 May 2019, Duisburg was relegated to the 3. Liga.

== Team ==
Note: Flags indicate national team as defined under FIFA eligibility rules; some limited exceptions apply. Players may hold more than one non-FIFA nationality.

No.	Pos.	Nation	Player
2	DF	KOR	Seo Young-jae
3	DF	TUN	Enis Hajri
4	DF	GER	Dustin Bomheuer
5	DF	SWE	Joseph Baffo
6	DF	GER	Gerrit Nauber (captain)
7	DF	GER	Andreas Wiegel
8	DF	GER	Migel-Max Schmeling
9	MF	GER	Ahmet Engin
10	MF	GER	Fabian Schnellhardt
11	FW	RUS	Stanislav Iljutcenko (vice-captain)
13	MF	GER	Lukas Daschner
14	MF	GER	Tim Albutat
15	FW	NED	John Verhoek
16	MF	GER	Lukas Fröde

No.	Pos.	Nation	Player
17	DF	GER	Kevin Wolze
20	MF	BRA	Cauly Oliveira Souza
21	MF	AUT	Christian Gartner
22	GK	GER	Jonas Brendieck
23	DF	GER	Yanni Regäsel
24	FW	UKR	Borys Tashchy
26	DF	GER	Vincent Gembalies
27	GK	GER	Daniel Mesenhöler
28	FW	NOR	Håvard Nielsen (on loan from Fortuna Düsseldorf)
29	DF	GER	Sebastian Neumann
30	GK	GER	Felix Wiedwald (on loan from Eintracht Frankfurt)
33	MF	GER	Moritz Stoppelkamp
36	MF	USA	Joe Gyau

== Transfers ==
=== In ===
No.	Pos.	Nat.	Name	Age	EU	Moving from	Type	Transfer window	Ends	Transfer fee	Source
2	DF	(South Korea)	Seo Young-jae	23	Non-EU	Hamburger SV II	Signing	Summer	2020	Free	MSV Duisburg
8	DF	(Germany)	Migel-Max Schmeling	18	EU	Youth system	Promoted	Summer			Westfalenpost
15	FW	(Netherlands)	John Verhoek	29	EU	1. FC Heidenheim	Signing	Summer	2021	Free	MSV Duisburg
19	FW	(Germany)	Richard Sukuta-Pasu	28	EU	SV Sandhausen	Signing	Summer	2020	Free	MSV Duisburg
22	GK	(Germany)	Jonas Brendieck	19	EU	Youth system	Promoted	Summer			Westfalenpost
23	DF	(Germany)	Yanni Regäsel	22	EU	Free agent	Signing	Summer	2020	Free	MSV Duisburg
27	GK	(Germany)	Daniel Mesenhöler	22	EU	Union Berlin	Signing	Summer	2020	Free	MSV Duisburg
29	DF	(Germany)	Sebastian Neumann	27	EU	Würzburger Kickers	Signing	Summer	2020	Free	MSV Duisburg
36	MF	(United States)	Joe Gyau	25	EU	Sonnenhof Großaspach	Signing	Summer	2020	Free	MSV Duisburg
5	DF	(Sweden)	Joseph Baffo	26	EU	Free agent	Signing	Winter	2019	Free	MSV Duisburg
28	FW	(Norway)	Håvard Nielsen	25	EU	Fortuna Düsseldorf	Loan	Winter	2019	Free	MSV Duisburg
30	GK	(Germany)	Felix Wiedwald	28	EU	Eintracht Frankfurt	Loan	Winter	2019	Free	MSV Duisburg

=== Out ===
No.	Pos.	Nat.	Name	Age	EU	Moving to	Type	Transfer window	Transfer fee	Source
1	GK	(Netherlands)	Mark Flekken	25	EU	SC Freiburg	Transfer	Summer	€800,000	SC Freiburg
5	DF	(Bosnia and Herzegovina)	Branimir Bajić	38	EU	Retired	Retired	Summer		Kicker
10	FW	(Nigeria)	Kingsley Onuegbu	32	Non-EU	(Cyprus) Nea Salamis Famagusta	End of contract	Summer	Free	Nea Salamis Famagusta FC
19	MF	(Germany)	Nico Klotz	31	EU	TuS Mündelheim	End of contract	Summer		WAZ
22	GK	(Germany)	Daniel Zeaiter	23	EU	Alemannia Aachen	End of contract	Summer	Free	Alemannia Aachen
27	DF	(Germany)	Dan-Patrick Poggenberg	26	EU	SG Sonnenhof Großaspach	End of contract	Summer	Free	SG Sonnenhof Großaspach
29	MF	(Azerbaijan)	Tuğrul Erat	26	EU	SV 19 Straelen	End of contract	Summer		SV 19 Straelen
31	DF	(Germany)	Marius Krüger	19	EU	Rumelner TV	End of contract	Summer		WAZ
1	GK	(Iran)	Daniel Davari	30	Non-EU	Rot-Weiß Oberhausen	Transfer	Winter	Free	Rot-Weiß Oberhausen
18	DF	(Germany)	Thomas Blomeyer	22	EU	Sportfreunde Lotte	Loan	Winter	Free	Sportfreunde Lotte
19	FW	(Germany)	Richard Sukuta-Pasu	28	EU	Guangdong South China Tiger	Transfer	Winter	Free	Reviersport

=== New contracts ===
Number	Position	Player	Contract length	Contract end	Date
11	FW	Stanislav Iljutcenko	2 years	2020	9 May 2018
18	DF	Thomas Blomeyer	2 years	2020	9 May 2018
7	MF	Andreas Wiegel	2 years	2020	30 May 2018
16	MF	Lukas Fröde	1 year	2020	13 July 2018

== Friendlies ==
27 June 2018 1	Hülser SV	0–12	MSV Duisburg	Krefeld
19:00		Report	Engin 6'; Tashchy 15', 33', 40'; Fröde 19'; Verhoek 34'; Schnellhardt 57', 84'; Albutat 65'; Souza 70'; Daschner 73'; Iljutcenko 89'	Attendance: 1,000

30 June 2018 2	MSV Duisburg	6–1	Duisburg City Allstars	Duisburg
13:00	Engin 26'; Schnellhardt 37'; Verhoek 51', 90'; Iljutcenko 60', 83'	Report	Namoni 68'	Attendance: 624

3 July 2018 3	MSV Duisburg (Germany)	1–2	(Belgium) Royal Antwerp	Altenberge
18:45	Wolze 31' (pen.)	Report	Rodrigues 51'; Bolingi 73'	Attendance: 400; Referee: Bastian Börner

5 July 2018 4	VfB Günnigfeld	0–10	MSV Duisburg	Bochum
19:00		Report	Iljutcenko 16', 41'; Souza 28'; Fröde 35'; Wolze 48'; Verhoek 70', 76', 87'; Gyau 73'; Stoppelkamp 85'	Attendance: 250; Referee: Turan Alabas

8 July 2018 5	FC Brünninghausen	0–3	MSV Duisburg	Herne
14:30		Report	Sukuta-Pasu 48', 58'; Hajri 60'
Note: The match will be played over 2x30 minutes

8 July 2018 6	Hertha BSC	1–0	MSV Duisburg	Herne
18:00	Duda 30'	Report
Note: The match will be played over 2x30 minutes

12 July 2018 7	Borussia Dortmund II	0–3	MSV Duisburg	St. Johann
18:00		Report	Verhoek 19'; Sukuta-Pasu 53', 58'

15 July 2018 8	Werder Bremen	1–0	MSV Duisburg	Zell am Ziller
13:00	J. Eggestein 23'	Report

18 July 2018 9	Wacker Innsbruck II (Austria)	0–3	(Germany) MSV Duisburg	Jenbach
18:00		Report	Gartner 52'; Tashchy 79'; Engin 88'

19 July 2018 10	Al Sadd (Qatar)	1–4	(Germany) MSV Duisburg	St. Johann
19:00	Hamroun 79'	Report	Stoppelkamp 12'; Al-Hamawende 48' (o.g.); Wolze 63', 90'

28 July 2018 11	MSV Duisburg (Germany)	0–0 (2–4 p)	(Italy) ACF Fiorentina	Duisburg
16:00		Report		Stadium: MSV-Arena; Attendance: 5,518
	Penalties
	Wolze (penalty missed); Stoppelkamp (penalty scored); Verhoek (penalty scored); Nauber (penalty missed)		(penalty scored) Eysseric; (penalty scored) Chiesa; (penalty scored) Simeone; (penalty scored) Dabo
Note: The match will be played over 45 minutes

28 July 2018 12	MSV Duisburg (Germany)	1–1	(Spain) Athletic Bilbao	Duisburg
18:00	Souza 15'	Report	Rico 8'	Stadium: MSV-Arena; Attendance: 5,518
Note: The match will be played over 45 minutes

17 October 2018 13	MSV Duisburg	7–0	GSV Moers	Duisburg
14:00	Iljutcenko 9'; Engin 12'; Verhoek 40'; Tashchy 57'; Sukuta-Pasu 75'; Fröhlich 83' (o.g.); Erol 86' (o.g.)	Report		Stadium: Westender Straße; Attendance: 650

16 November 2018 14	MSV Duisburg	1–1	VfL Osnabrück	Duisburg
14:00	Iljutcenko 85'	Report	Krasniqi 55'	Stadium: Westender Straße; Attendance: 600; Referee: Robin Braun

11 January 2019 15	MSV Duisburg (Germany)	1–1	(Netherlands) FC Groningen	Duisburg
15:00	Engin 57' (pen.)	Report	Balk 77'	Stadium: Westender Straße; Referee: Martin Ulankiewicz

16 January 2019 16	MSV Duisburg (Germany)	1–1	(Portugal) Portimonense	Almancil
15:30	Bomheuer 54'	Report	56'	Stadium: Estádio Algarve

21 January 2019 17	MSV Duisburg (Germany)	3–2	(Switzerland) Servette FC	Albufeira
16:00	Wolze 22' (pen.); Souza 30'; Gyau 33'	Report	Rouiller 36'; Stevanović 81'	Stadium: Estádio da Nora

21 January 2019 17	FC Utrecht (Netherlands)	6–0	(Germany) MSV Duisburg	Utrecht
16:00	Van de Streek 6'; Bazoer 9'; Kerk 10', 20', 52'; Emanuelson 80'	Report		Stadium: Stadion Galgenwaard; Attendance: 0
Note: The match was played bahind closed doors, with no attendance.

24 April 2019 18	MSV Duisburg (Germany)	2–0	(Germany) Westfalie Herne	Duisburg
18:30	Engin 16'; Daschner 28'	Report
Note: The match was cancelled after 45 minutes due a thunder storm.

== Results ==
Times from 1 July to 27 October 2018 and from 31 March to 30 June 2019 are UTC+2, from 28 October 2018 to 30 March 2019 UTC+1.

=== Overview ===
Competition	First match	Last match	Starting round	Final position	Record							
Competition	First match	Last match	Starting round	Final position	Pld	W	D	L	GF	GA	GD	Win %
2. Bundesliga	6 August 2018	18 May 2019	Matchday 1	18th	34	6	10	18	39	65	−26	17.65
DFB-Pokal	18 August 2018	5 February 2019	Round 1	Round 3	3	2	0	1	5	3	+2	66.67
Total					37	8	10	19	44	68	−24	21.62

Last updated: 19 May 2019
Source: Soccerway

=== 2. Bundesliga ===
==== League table ====
Pos	Team	Pld	W	D	L	GF	GA	GD	Pts	Promotion, qualification or relegation
14	Erzgebirge Aue	34	11	7	16	43	47	−4	40	
15	SV Sandhausen	34	9	11	14	45	52	−7	38	
16	FC Ingolstadt (R)	34	9	8	17	43	55	−12	35	Qualification for relegation play-offs
17	1. FC Magdeburg (R)	34	6	13	15	35	53	−18	31	Relegation to 3. Liga
18	MSV Duisburg (R)	34	6	10	18	39	65	−26	28	Relegation to 3. Liga

Source: DFB
Rules for classification: 1) Points; 2) Goal difference; 3) Goals scored; 4) Head-to-head points; 5) Head-to-head goal difference; 6) Head-to-head goals scored; 7) Head-to-head away goals scored; 8) Away goals scored; 9) Play-off.
(R) Relegated

==== Results summary ====
Overall								Home						Away					
Pld	W	D	L	GF	GA	GD	Pts	W	D	L	GF	GA	GD	W	D	L	GF	GA	GD
34	6	10	18	39	65	−26	28	3	3	11	25	39	−14	3	7	7	14	26	−12

Last updated: 19 May 2019.
Source: DFB

==== Result round by round ====
Round	1	2	3	4	5	6	7	8	9	10	11	12	13	14	15	16	17	18	19	20	21	22	23	24	25	26	27	28	29	30	31	32	33	34
Ground	A	H	A	H	A	H	A	H	A	H	A	H	A	A	H	A	H	H	A	H	A	H	A	H	A	H	A	H	A	H	H	A	H	A
Result	L	L	L	L	D	L	D	L	W	L	D	W	D	W	L	L	L	L	L	W	L	L	D	W	D	D	L	D	L	D	D	W	L	L
Position	14	17	18	18	18	18	18	18	16	17	17	17	16	15	15	15	15	16	18	17	18	18	18	16	16	17	18	17	18	18	18	18	18	18

Source: DFB
A = Away; H = Home; W = Win; D = Draw; L = Loss

==== Matches ====
6 August 2018 1	Dynamo Dresden	1–0	MSV Duisburg	Dresden
20:30	Röser 39'	Report		Stadium: Stadion Dresden; Attendance: 28,733; Referee: Daniel Siebert

11 August 2018 2	MSV Duisburg	0–2	VfL Bochum	Duisburg
13:00		Report	Sam 55'; Ganvoula 64'	Stadium: MSV-Arena; Attendance: 20,541; Referee: Christian Dingert

24 August 2018 3	Darmstadt 98	3–0	MSV Duisburg	Darmstadt
18:30	Heller 68'; Dursun 74'; Kempe 86'	Report		Stadium: Merck-Stadion am Böllenfalltor; Attendance: 15,170; Referee: Robert Hartmann

1 September 2018 4	MSV Duisburg	0–1	SpVgg Greuther Fürth	Duisburg
13:00		Report	Mohr 2'	Stadium: MSV-Arena; Attendance: 12,070; Referee: Florian Heft

14 September 2018 5	Union Berlin	2–2	MSV Duisburg	Berlin
18:30	Gogia 44'; Hübner 90+1'	Report	Souza 77'; Sukuta-Pasu 83'	Stadium: Stadion An der Alten Försterei; Attendance: 20,329; Referee: Michael Bacher

23 September 2018 6	MSV Duisburg	1–2	Erzgebirge Aue	Duisburg
13:30	Wolze 42' (pen.)	Report	Testroet 49' (pen.); Kvesić 84'	Stadium: MSV-Arena; Attendance: 13,119; Referee: Matthias Jöllenbeck

26 September 2018 7	1. FC Magdeburg	3–3	MSV Duisburg	Magdeburg
18:30	Beck 62'; Türpitz 64'; Handke 84'	Report	Iljutcenko 19'; Wolze 66'; Daschner 88'	Stadium: MDCC-Arena; Attendance: 18,696; Referee: Daniel Schlager

29 September 2018 8	MSV Duisburg	1–3	Jahn Regensburg	Duisburg
13:00	Gyau 24'	Report	Grüttner 11'; Stolze 13'; George 78' (pen.)	Stadium: MSV-Arena; Attendance: 11,096; Referee: Alexander Sather

8 October 2018 9	1. FC Köln	1–2	MSV Duisburg	Cologne
20:30	Hector 35'	Report	Souza 9'; Bader 73' (o.g.)	Stadium: Müngersdorfer Stadion; Attendance: 49,600; Referee: Florian Badstübner

22 October 2018 10	MSV Duisburg	0–1	FC St. Pauli	Duisburg
20:30		Report	Allagui 84'	Stadium: MSV-Arena; Attendance: 20,130; Referee: Pascal Müller

28 October 2018 11	FC Ingolstadt	1–1	MSV Duisburg	Ingolstadt
13:30	Matip 90+2'	Report	Matip 79' (pen.)	Stadium: Audi Sportpark; Attendance: 6,564; Referee: Thorben Siewer

3 November 2018 12	MSV Duisburg	2–0	SC Paderborn	Duisburg
13:00	Souza 24'; Tashchy 63'	Report		Stadium: MSV-Arena; Attendance: 13,161; Referee: Florian Heft

9 November 2018 13	SV Sandhausen	0–0	MSV Duisburg	Sandhausen
18:30		Report		Stadium: BWT-Stadion am Hardtwald; Referee: Christof Günsch

23 November 2018 14	Arminia Bielefeld	0–1	MSV Duisburg	Bielefeld
18:30		Report	Engin 82'	Stadium: Bielefelder Alm; Attendance: 14,766; Referee: Bibiana Steinhaus

2 December 2018 15	MSV Duisburg	0–4	Holstein Kiel	Duisburg
13:30		Report	Schindler 56'; Serra 60', 77'; Lee 89'	Stadium: MSV-Arena; Attendance: 12,320; Referee: Florian Badstübner

8 December 2018 16	1. FC Heidenheim	4–1	MSV Duisburg	Heidenheim
13:00	Thomalla 35'; Dovedan 47', 90+2'; Schnatterer 67' (pen.)	Report	Wolze 69'	Stadium: Voith-Arena; Attendance: 10,250; Referee: Patrick Alt

14 December 2018 17	MSV Duisburg	1–2	Hamburger SV	Duisburg
18:30	Nauber 14'	Report	Narey 12'; Hunt 19'	Stadium: MSV-Arena; Attendance: 26,500; Referee: Christian Dietz

23 December 2018 18	MSV Duisburg	1–3	Dynamo Dresden	Duisburg
13:30	Souza 66'	Report	Röser 4'; Atik 45+2'; Koné 53'	Stadium: MSV-Arena; Attendance: 14,836; Referee: Florian Heft

29 January 2019 19	VfL Bochum	2–1	MSV Duisburg	Bochum
18:30	Zoller 13'; Fabian 21'	Report	Nielsen 79'	Stadium: Ruhrstadion; Attendance: 17,810; Referee: Daniel Schlager

1 February 2019 20	MSV Duisburg	3–2	Darmstadt 98	Duisburg
18:30	Wolze 8'; Nielsen 25'; Iljutcenko 59'	Report	Bertram 73'; Moritz 87'	Stadium: MSV-Arena; Attendance: 11,213; Referee: Thorben Siewer

9 February 2019 21	SpVgg Greuther Fürth	1–0	MSV Duisburg	Fürth
13:00	Keita-Ruel 86' (pen.)	Report		Stadium: Sportpark Ronhof Thomas Sommer; Attendance: 8,635; Referee: Harm Osmers

16 February 2019 22	MSV Duisburg	2–3	Union Berlin	Duisburg
13:00	Nielsen 45'; Fröde 56'	Report	Žulj 11'; Hartel 64'; Andersson 89'	Stadium: MSV-Arena; Attendance: 12,316; Referee: Timo Gerach

24 February 2019 23	Erzgebirge Aue	0–0	MSV Duisburg	Aue
13:30		Report		Stadium: Erzgebirgsstadion; Attendance: 8,100; Referee: Deniz Aytekin

1 March 2019 24	MSV Duisburg	1–0	1. FC Magdeburg	Duisburg
18:30	Hajri 90+2'	Report		Stadium: MSV-Arena; Attendance: 13,416; Referee: Patrick Alt

9 March 2019 25	Jahn Regensburg	1–1	MSV Duisburg	Regensburg
13:00	Al Ghaddioui 39'	Report	Wolze 67' (pen.)	Stadium: Continental Arena; Attendance: 10,141; Referee: Matthias Jöllenbeck

29 March 2019 26	FC St. Pauli	0–0	MSV Duisburg	Hamburg
18:30		Report		Stadium: Millerntor-Stadion; Attendance: 29,546; Referee: Bastian Dankert

6 April 2019 27	MSV Duisburg	2–4	FC Ingolstadt	Duisburg
13:00	Iljutcenko 46'; Wolze 90+2'	Report	Lezcano 31', 61' (pen.); Kittel 89'; Pledl 90+5'	Stadium: MSV-Arena; Attendance: 14,127; Referee: Robert Kempter

10 April 2019 28	MSV Duisburg	4–4	1. FC Köln	Duisburg
18:30	Stoppelkamp 2', 71'; Fröde 29'; Wolze 81'	Report	Córdoba 24', 53'; Schaub 47'; Terodde 54'	Stadium: MSV-Arena; Attendance: 25,675; Referee: Daniel Schlager
Note: The match was scheduled to take place on 17 March but was postponed due to an unplayable field.

13 April 2019 29	SC Paderborn	4–0	MSV Duisburg	Paderborn
13:00	Klement 25'; Guèye 42'; Tekpetey 59'; Vasiliadis 79'	Report		Stadium: Benteler-Arena; Attendance: 11,111; Referee: Florian Badstübner

20 April 2019 30	MSV Duisburg	2–2	SV Sandhausen	Duisburg
13:00	Nielsen 71'; Wolze 88' (pen.)	Report	Wooten 28', 62' (pen.)	Stadium: MSV-Arena; Attendance: 13,295; Referee: Timo Gerach

29 April 2019 31	MSV Duisburg	2–2	Arminia Bielefeld	Duisburg
20:30	Iljutcenko 20'; Wolze 68'	Report	Voglsammer 7', 61' (pen.)	Stadium: MSV-Arena; Attendance: 13,340; Referee: Michael Bacher

5 May 2019 32	Holstein Kiel	0–2	MSV Duisburg	Kiel
13:30		Report	Gyau 55'; Albutat 68'	Stadium: Holstein-Stadion; Attendance: 12,122; Referee: Christian Dietz

12 May 2019 33	MSV Duisburg	3–4	1. FC Heidenheim	Duisburg
15:30	Stoppelkamp 33'; Bomheuer 51'; Daschner 80'	Report	Glatzel 27'; Thomalla 37'; Bomheuer 58' (o.g.); Dorsch 82'	Stadium: MSV-Arena; Attendance: 14,392; Referee: Thorben Siewer

18 May 2019 34	Hamburger SV	3–0	MSV Duisburg	Hamburg
15:30	Lacroix 15'; Wintzheimer 49'; Arp 64'	Report		Stadium: Volksparkstadion; Attendance: 51,147; Referee: René Rohde

=== DFB-Pokal ===
18 August 2018 Round 1	TuS Dassendorf	0–1	MSV Duisburg	Hamburg
15:30		Report	Tashchy 23'	Stadium: Stadion Sander Tannen; Attendance: 1,500; Referee: Alexander Sather

31 October 2018 Round 2	Arminia Bielefeld	0–3	MSV Duisburg	Bielefeld
20:45		Report	Verhoek 12'; Schnellhardt 39'; Souza 45'	Stadium: Bielefelder Alm; Attendance: 19,143; Referee: Arne Aarnink

5 February 2019 Round 3	MSV Duisburg	1–3	SC Paderborn	Duisburg
20:45	Souza 47'	Report	Tekpetey 52'; Pröger 61'; Antwi-Adjei 76'	Stadium: MSV-Arena; Attendance: 12,509; Referee: Sven Jablonski

== Statistics ==
=== Squad statistics ===
No.	Pos	Nat	Player	Total		2. Bundesliga		DFB-Pokal	
No.	Pos	Nat	Player	Apps	Goals	Apps	Goals	Apps	Goals
1	GK	(Iran) IRI	Daniel Davari^{†}	5	0	4	0	1	0
2	DF	(South Korea) KOR	Seo Young-jae	8	0	7	0	1	0
3	DF	(Tunisia) TUN	Enis Hajri	16	1	16	1	0	0
4	DF	(Germany) GER	Dustin Bomheuer	26	1	23	1	3	0
5	DF	(Sweden) SWE	Joseph Baffo	1	0	1	0	0	0
6	DF	(Germany) GER	Gerrit Nauber	32	1	30	1	2	0
7	DF	(Germany) GER	Andreas Wiegel	29	0	27	0	2	0
8	DF	(Germany) GER	Migel-Max Schmeling	0	0	0	0	0	0
9	MF	(Germany) GER	Ahmet Engin	31	1	28	1	3	0
10	MF	(Germany) GER	Fabian Schnellhardt	36	1	33	0	3	1
11	FW	(Russia) RUS	Stanislav Iljutcenko	34	4	31	4	3	0
13	MF	(Germany) GER	Lukas Daschner	7	2	7	2	0	0
14	MF	(Germany) GER	Tim Albutat	16	1	16	1	0	0
15	FW	(Netherlands) NED	John Verhoek	25	1	22	0	3	1
16	MF	(Germany) GER	Lukas Fröde	27	2	25	2	2	0
17	DF	(Germany) GER	Kevin Wolze	34	9	31	9	3	0
18	DF	(Germany) GER	Thomas Blomeyer^{†}	0	0	0	0	0	0
19	FW	(Germany) GER	Richard Sukuta-Pasu^{†}	17	1	14	1	3	0
20	MF	(Brazil) BRA	Cauly Oliveira Souza	31	6	28	4	3	2
21	MF	(Austria) AUT	Christian Gartner	2	0	2	0	0	0
22	GK	(Germany) GER	Jonas Brendieck	0	0	0	0	0	0
23	DF	(Germany) GER	Yanni Regäsel	6	0	5	0	1	0
24	FW	(Ukraine) UKR	Borys Tashchy	21	2	19	1	2	1
26	DF	(Germany) GER	Vincent Gembalies	3	0	3	0	0	0
27	GK	(Germany) GER	Daniel Mesenhöler	16	0	15	0	1	0
28	FW	(Norway) NOR	Håvard Nielsen	17	4	16	4	1	0
29	DF	(Germany) GER	Sebastian Neumann	8	0	7	0	1	0
30	GK	(Germany) GER	Felix Wiedwald	16	0	15	0	1	0
33	MF	(Germany) GER	Moritz Stoppelkamp	29	3	26	3	3	0
36	MF	(United States) USA	Joe Gyau	20	2	20	2	0	0

Last updated: 19 May 2019
Source: Soccerway

- ^{†} Players who left the club mid-season.

=== Goals ===
Rank	Player	Position	2. Bundesliga	DFB-Pokal	Total
1	(Germany) Kevin Wolze	DF	9	0	9
2	(Brazil) Cauly Oliveira Souza	MF	4	2	6
3	(Russia) Stanislav Iljutcenko	FW	4	0	4
3	(Norway) Håvard Nielsen	FW	4	0	4
5	(Germany) Moritz Stoppelkamp	MF	3	0	3
6	(Germany) Lukas Daschner	MF	2	0	2
6	(Germany) Lukas Fröde	MF	1	1	2
6	(United States) Joe Gyau	MF	2	0	2
6	(Ukraine) Borys Tashchy	FW	2	0	2
10	(Germany) Tim Albutat	MF	1	0	1
10	(Germany) Dustin Bomheuer	DF	1	0	1
10	(Germany) Ahmet Engin	MF	1	0	1
10	(Tunisia) Enis Hajri	DF	1	0	1
10	(Germany) Gerrit Nauber	DF	1	0	1
10	(Germany) Fabian Schnellhardt	MF	0	1	1
10	(Germany) Richard Sukuta-Pasu	FW	1	0	1
10	(Netherlands) John Verhoek	FW	0	1	1
Own goals			2	0	2
Total			40	5	45

=== Clean sheets ===
Rank	Name	2. Bundesliga	DFB-Pokal	Total
1	(Germany) Daniel Mesenhöler	3	1	4
1	(Germany) Felix Wiedwald	4	0	4
3	(Iran) Daniel Davari	0	1	1
Total		7	2	9

=== Disciplinary record ===
N	P	Nat.	Name	2. Bundesliga			DFB-Pokal			Total			Notes
N	P	Nat.	Name	Yellow card	Second yellow card	Red card	Yellow card	Second yellow card	Red card	Yellow card	Second yellow card	Red card	Notes
16	MF	(Germany)	Lukas Fröde	9		1				9		1	
3	DF	(Tunisia)	Enis Hajri	3		1				3		1	
14	MF	(Germany)	Tim Albutat	3	1					3	1		
17	DF	(Germany)	Kevin Wolze	10			1			11			
7	DF	(Germany)	Andreas Wiegel	9			1			10			
10	MF	(Germany)	Fabian Schnellhardt	9						9			
11	FW	(Russia)	Stanislav Iljutcenko	8						8			
15	FW	(Netherlands)	John Verhoek	8						8			
6	DF	(Germany)	Gerrit Nauber	7						7			
4	DF	(Germany)	Dustin Bomheuer	5			1			6			
33	MF	(Germany)	Moritz Stoppelkamp	3						3			
9	MF	(Germany)	Ahmet Engin	1			1			2			
19	FW	(Germany)	Richard Sukuta-Pasu	2						2			
23	DF	(Germany)	Yanni Regäsel	1			1			2			
24	FW	(Ukraine)	Borys Tashchy	2						2			
36	MF	(United States)	Joe Gyau	2						2			
5	DF	(Sweden)	Joseph Baffo	1						1			
20	MF	(Brazil)	Cauly Oliveira Souza	1						1			
29	DF	(Germany)	Sebastian Neumann	1						1			

Last updated: 19 May 2019
Source: Soccerway
Ordered by (red card) , (second yellow card) and (yellow card)
(yellow card) = Number of bookings; (second yellow card) = Number of sending offs after a second yellow card; (red card) = Number of sending offs by a direct red card.
