= Schönebürgstadion =

Arena in Crailsheim, Germany

Coordinates: 49°08′32″N 10°04′52″E

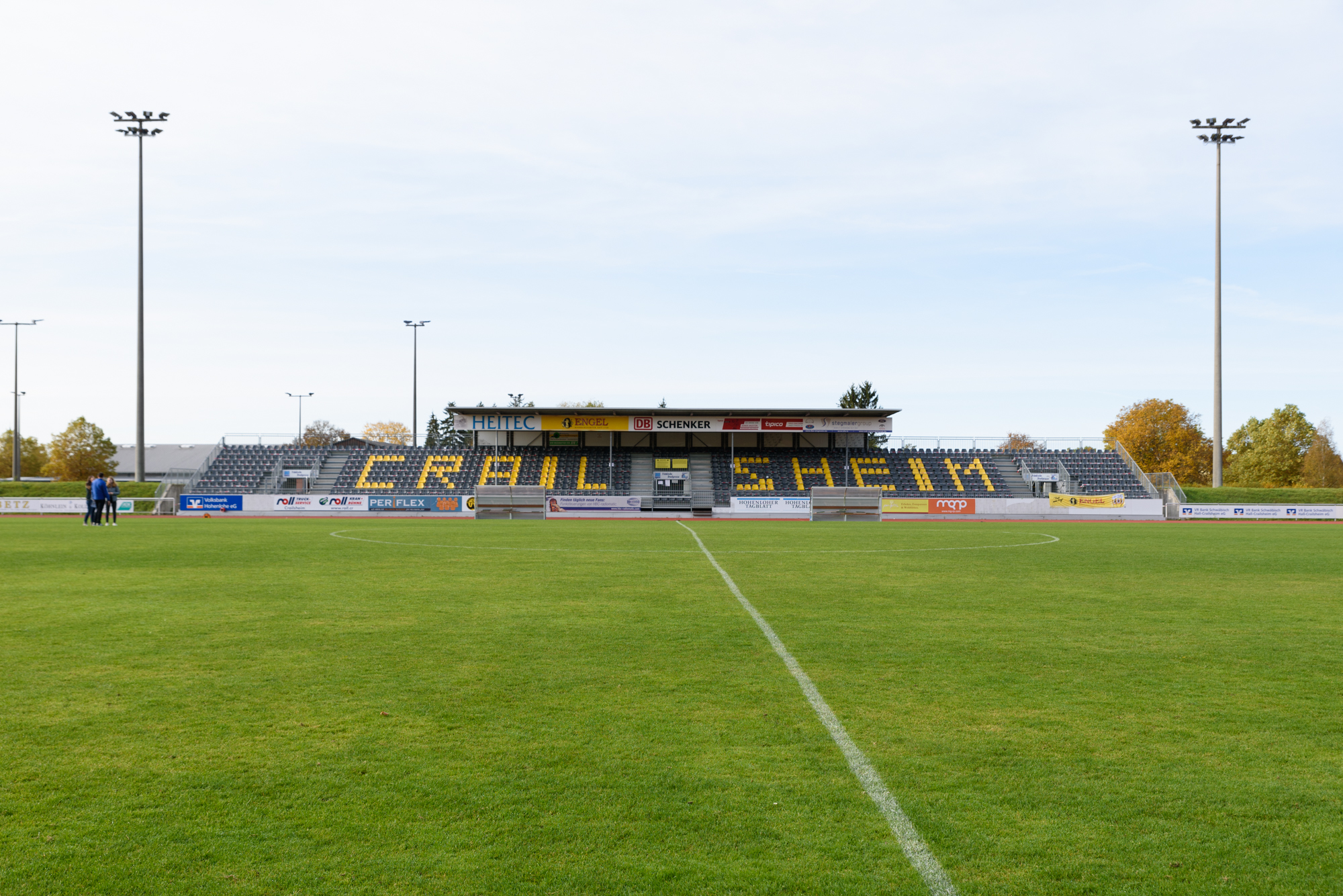
- Interactive map of Schönebürgstadion
- Full name: Schönebürgstadion
- Location: Crailsheim, Germany
- Capacity: 5,000

Construction
- Opened: 1976

Tenant
- TSV Crailsheim

Schönebürgstadion is an arena in Crailsheim, Germany. It is primarily used for football, and is the home to the TSV Crailsheim of the Bezirksliga Hohenlohe. It opened in 1976 and holds 5,000 spectators.
