= Ömer Tokaç =

Turkish footballer

Personal information
- Full name: Ömer Berke Tokaç
- Date of birth: 26 October 2000 (age 26)
- Place of birth: Engelskirchen, Germany
- Height: 1.70 m (5 ft 7 in)
- Position: Forward

Team information
- Current team: Sportfreunde Siegen
- Number: 14

Youth career
- –2007: SSV 08 Bergneustadt
- 2007–2019: Bayer Leverkusen

Senior career*
Years	Team	Apps	(Gls)
2019–2020	Shonan Bellmare	1	(0)
2020	→ Fukushima United (loan)	32	(7)
2021	Fukushima United	17	(7)
2022	Tochigi SC	21	(1)
2023–2025	SV Eintracht Hohkeppel	66	(31)
2025–	Sportfreunde Siegen	39	(6)

International career
2015	Turkey U15	2	(1)
- * Club domestic league appearances and goals as of 23 September 2026

Ömer Berke Tokaç (born 26 November 2000) is a Turkish professional footballer who plays as a forward for German Regionalliga West club Sportfreunde Siegen.

== Career statistics ==
=== Club ===
As of 20 December 2020

Appearances and goals by club, season and competition
Club	Season	League			Cup		Other		Total	
Club	Season	Division	Apps	Goals	Apps	Goals	Apps	Goals	Apps	Goals
Shonan Bellmare	2019	J1 League	1	0	0	0	0	0	1	0
Fukushima United FC	2020	J3 League	32	7	–		–		32	7
Career total			33	7	0	0	0	0	33	7
