= Jeanette Dyer =

American soccer player and coach (born 1986)

Jeannette Dyer
Personal information
- Full name: Jeannette Elizabeth Dyer
- Date of birth: July 24, 1986 (age 40)
- Place of birth: Punta Gorda, Florida, United States
- Height: 1.67 m (5 ft 6 in)
- Position: Defender

Jeannette Elizabeth Dyer (born July 24, 1986) is an American former soccer player and coach who played for TSV Crailsheim.
