= Hamza Saghiri =

German footballer (born 1997)

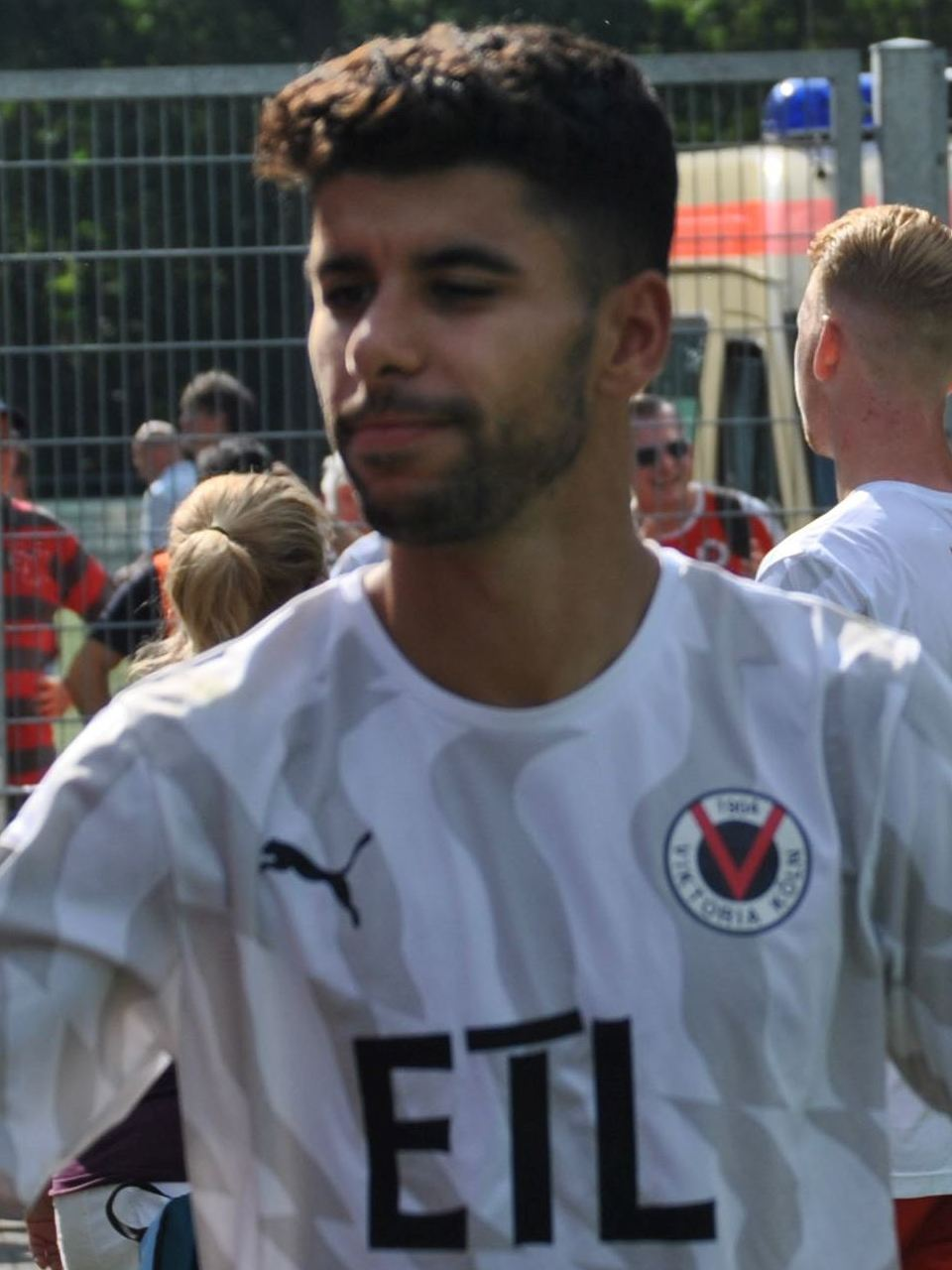
- Saghiri in 2019

Personal information
- Date of birth: 18 February 1997 (age 29)
- Place of birth: Würselen, Germany
- Height: 1.80 m (5 ft 11 in)
- Position: Midfielder

Team information
- Current team: Sportfreunde Siegen
- Number: 37

Youth career
- –2005: VfL Übach-Boscheln
- 2005–2015: Alemannia Aachen
- 2015–2016: Viktoria Köln

Senior career*
Years	Team	Apps	(Gls)
2016–2020	Viktoria Köln	86	(6)
2016–2017	Viktoria Köln II	3	(0)
2020–2022	Waldhof Mannheim	54	(2)
2022–2023	Viktoria Köln	32	(0)
2024	Politehnica Iași	8	(1)
2025	VSG Altglienicke	14	(1)
2025–	Sportfreunde Siegen	38	(1)
- * Club domestic league appearances and goals as of 23 September 2026

Hamza Saghiri (born 18 February 1997) is a German professional footballer who plays as a midfielder for Regionalliga West club Sportfreunde Siegen.

== Career ==
Saghiri made his professional debut in the 3. Liga for Viktoria Köln on 20 July 2019, starting against Hansa Rostock before being substituted out at half-time for Moritz Fritz, with the match finishing as a 3–3 away draw.

== Honours ==
Viktoria Köln

- Regionalliga West: 2016–17, 2018–19
- Mittelrheinpokal: 2017–18, 2012–23

Waldhof Mannheim

- Badischer Pokal: 2019–20, 2020–21, 2021–22
