= Cauly =

Brazilian footballer (born 1995)

Personal information
- Full name: Cauly Oliveira Souza
- Date of birth: 15 September 1995 (age 31)
- Place of birth: Porto Seguro, Brazil
- Height: 1.75 m (5 ft 9 in)
- Position: Midfielder

Team information
- Current team: São Paulo (on loan from Bahia)
- Number: 80

Youth career
- –2010: Rot-Weiß Dünstekoven
- 2010: 1. JFS Köln
- 2010–2014: 1. FC Köln

Senior career*
| Years | Team | Apps | (Gls) |
| 2014–2017 | Fortuna Köln | 83 | (13) |
| 2017–2019 | MSV Duisburg | 55 | (10) |
| 2019 | SC Paderborn | 13 | (2) |
| 2020–2023 | Ludogorets Razgrad | 72 | (19) |
| 2023– | Bahia | 120 | (16) |
| 2026– | → São Paulo (loan) | 9 | (1) |
- * Club domestic league appearances and goals as of 6 April 2026

Cauly Oliveira Souza (born 15 September 1995), commonly known as Cauly, is a Brazilian professional footballer who plays as a midfielder for Campeonato Brasileiro Série A club São Paulo, on loan from Bahia.

== Career ==
For the 2017–18 season, he moved to MSV Duisburg. For the 2019–20 season, he signed with SC Paderborn. On 13 January 2020, he signed with Ludogorets Razgrad.

== Career statistics ==
As of 28 July 2025

Appearances and goals by club, season and competition
| Club | Season | League | | | State League | | Cup | | Continental | | Other | | Total | |
| Club | Season | Division | Apps | Goals | Apps | Goals | Apps | Goals | Apps | Goals | Apps | Goals | Apps | Goals |
|---|---|---|---|---|---|---|---|---|---|---|---|---|---|---|
| Fortuna Köln | 2014–15 | 3. Liga | 28 | 2 | — | | 0 | 0 | — | | — | | 28 | 2 |
| Fortuna Köln | 2015–16 | 3. Liga | 22 | 6 | — | | 0 | 0 | — | | — | | 22 | 6 |
| Fortuna Köln | 2016–17 | 3. Liga | 33 | 5 | — | | 0 | 0 | — | | — | | 33 | 5 |
| Fortuna Köln | Total | | 83 | 13 | — | | 0 | 0 | — | | — | | 83 | 13 |
| MSV Duisburg | 2017–18 | 2. Bundesliga | 27 | 6 | — | | 1 | 0 | — | | — | | 28 | 6 |
| MSV Duisburg | 2018–19 | 2. Bundesliga | 28 | 4 | — | | 3 | 2 | — | | — | | 31 | 6 |
| MSV Duisburg | Total | | 55 | 10 | — | | 4 | 2 | — | | — | | 59 | 12 |
| SC Paderborn | 2019–20 | Bundesliga | 13 | 2 | — | | 2 | 0 | — | | — | | 15 | 2 |
| Ludogorets Razgrad | 2019–20 | First League | 10 | 3 | — | | 1 | 0 | 2 (Note: Appearance(s) in UEFA Europa League.) | 1 | — | | 13 | 4 |
| Ludogorets Razgrad | 2020–21 | First League | 27 | 6 | — | | 5 | 1 | 9 (Note: Two appearances and one goal in UEFA Champions League, seven appearances in UEFA Europa League.) | 1 | 1 (Note: Appearance(s) in Bulgarian Supercup.) | 0 | 42 | 8 |
| Ludogorets Razgrad | 2021–22 | First League | 19 | 5 | — | | 3 | 1 | 8 (Note: Appearance(s) in UEFA Champions League.) | 2 | 1 | 0 | 31 | 8 |
| Ludogorets Razgrad | 2022–23 | First League | 16 | 5 | — | | 0 | 0 | 12 (Note: Five appearances and one goal in UEFA Champions League, seven appearances and one goal in UEFA Europa League.) | 2 | 1 | 0 | 29 | 7 |
| Ludogorets Razgrad | Total | | 72 | 19 | — | | 9 | 2 | 31 | 6 | 3 | 0 | 115 | 27 |
| Bahia | 2023 | Série A | 32 | 4 | 4 | 3 | 7 | 3 | — | | 4 (Note: Appearance(s) in Copa do Nordeste.) | 0 | 47 | 10 |
| Bahia | 2024 | Série A | 38 | 4 | 8 | 2 | 8 | 3 | — | | 8 | 0 | 62 | 9 |
| Bahia | 2025 | Série A | 12 | 1 | 9 | 2 | 1 | 1 | 12 (Note: Ten appearances in Copa Libertadores, two appearances in Copa Sudamericana.) | 0 | 5 | 0 | 39 | 4 |
| Bahia | Total | | 82 | 9 | 21 | 7 | 16 | 7 | 12 | 0 | 17 | 0 | 148 | 23 |
| Career total | | | 305 | 53 | 21 | 7 | 29 | 10 | 43 | 6 | 18 | 0 | 416 | 76 |

== Honours ==
Ludogorets Razgrad

- Bulgarian First League: 2019–20, 2020–21, 2021–22
- Bulgarian Supercup: 2021, 2022

Bahia

- Campeonato Baiano: 2023
