= Streli Mamba =

German footballer (born 1994)

Personal information
- Date of birth: 17 June 1994 (age 32)
- Place of birth: Göppingen, Germany
- Height: 1.77 m (5 ft 10 in)
- Position: Forward

Team information
- Current team: Muangthong United
- Number: 45

Youth career
- FTSV Kuchen
- SV Ebersbach
- 1. FC Eislingen
- 2010: Karlsruher SC
- 2010–2011: VfB Stuttgart
- 2011–2012: 1. FC Kaiserslautern

Senior career*
Years	Team	Apps	(Gls)
2012	FC Homburg	3	(0)
2013	Stuttgarter Kickers	0	(0)
2013	SV Göppingen	5	(1)
2014	TSV Grunbach	12	(3)
2014–2015	SGV Freiberg	27	(9)
2015–2016	SV Sandhausen II	34	(10)
2016–2019	Energie Cottbus	96	(39)
2019–2021	SC Paderborn	26	(6)
2021–2022	Kairat	11	(1)
2021–2022	→ Hansa Rostock (loan)	15	(1)
2022–2023	Dalian Pro	42	(6)
2024	Tuzlaspor	16	(6)
2024–2025	Erzurumspor	25	(5)
2026	SSV Ulm	9	(1)
2026–	Muangthong United	2	(2)
- * Club domestic league appearances and goals as of 00:14, 22 September 2026 (UTC)

Streli Mamba (born 17 June 1994) is a German professional footballer who plays as a forward for Thai League 2 club Muangthong United.

== Club career ==
Ahead of the 2019–20 season, Mamba joined Bundesliga club SC Paderborn 07 on a three-year contract. In September 2020, a move to 1. FC Köln failed due to a muscle injury detected during Mamba's medical examination. Both clubs had already agreed a transfer fee following protracted negotiations.

On 19 January 2021, Mamba signed with Kazakhstan Premier League club Kairat until 31 December 2022. On 14 June 2021, after scoring 2 goals in 13 appearances in all competitions for Kairat, Mamba joined Hansa Rostock on a year-long loan deal with the option to make the move permanent. On 11 July 2022, Kairat announced that Mamba had left the club after his contract was terminated by mutual agreement.

On 21 August 2022, Mamba joined Chinese Super League club Dalian Pro.

In January 2024, Mamba signed with TFF First League club Tuzlaspor.

== Personal life ==
Born in Germany, Mamba is of Congolese Malagasy descent.

== Career statistics ==
As of 11 May 2024

Club	Season	League			Cup		Continental		Other		Total	
Club	Season	Division	Apps	Goals	Apps	Goals	Apps	Goals	Apps	Goals	Apps	Goals
TSV Grunbach	2013–14	Oberliga Baden-Württemberg	12	3	—		—		—		12	3
SGV Freiberg	2014–15	Oberliga Baden-Württemberg	27	9	—		—		—		27	9
SV Sandhausen II	2015–16	Oberliga Baden-Württemberg	34	10	—		—		—		34	10
Energie Cottbus	2016–17	Regionalliga Nordost	32	8	—		—		—		32	8
Energie Cottbus	2017–18	Regionalliga Nordost	28	20	1	0	—		—		29	21
Energie Cottbus	2018–19	3. Liga	36	11	1	0	—		—		37	11
Energie Cottbus	Total		96	39	2	0	—		—		98	39
SC Paderborn	2019–20	Bundesliga	24	5	2	1	—		—		26	6
SC Paderborn	2020–21	2. Bundesliga	0	0	0	0	—		—		0	0
SC Paderborn	Total		24	5	2	1	—		—		26	6
Kairat	2021	Kazakhstan Premier League	11	1	0	0	—		2	1	13	2
Hansa Rostock (loan)	2021–22	2. Bundesliga	15	1	3	1	—		—		18	2
Dalian Pro	2022	Chinese Super League	16	3	1	0	—		—		17	3
Dalian Pro	2023	Chinese Super League	26	3	1	1	—		—		27	4
Dalian Pro	Total		42	6	2	1	—		—		44	7
Tuzlaspor	2023–24	1. Lig	16	6	0	0	—		—		16	6
Career Total			276	80	9	3	0	0	2	1	288	84
