= Joe Gyau =

American soccer player

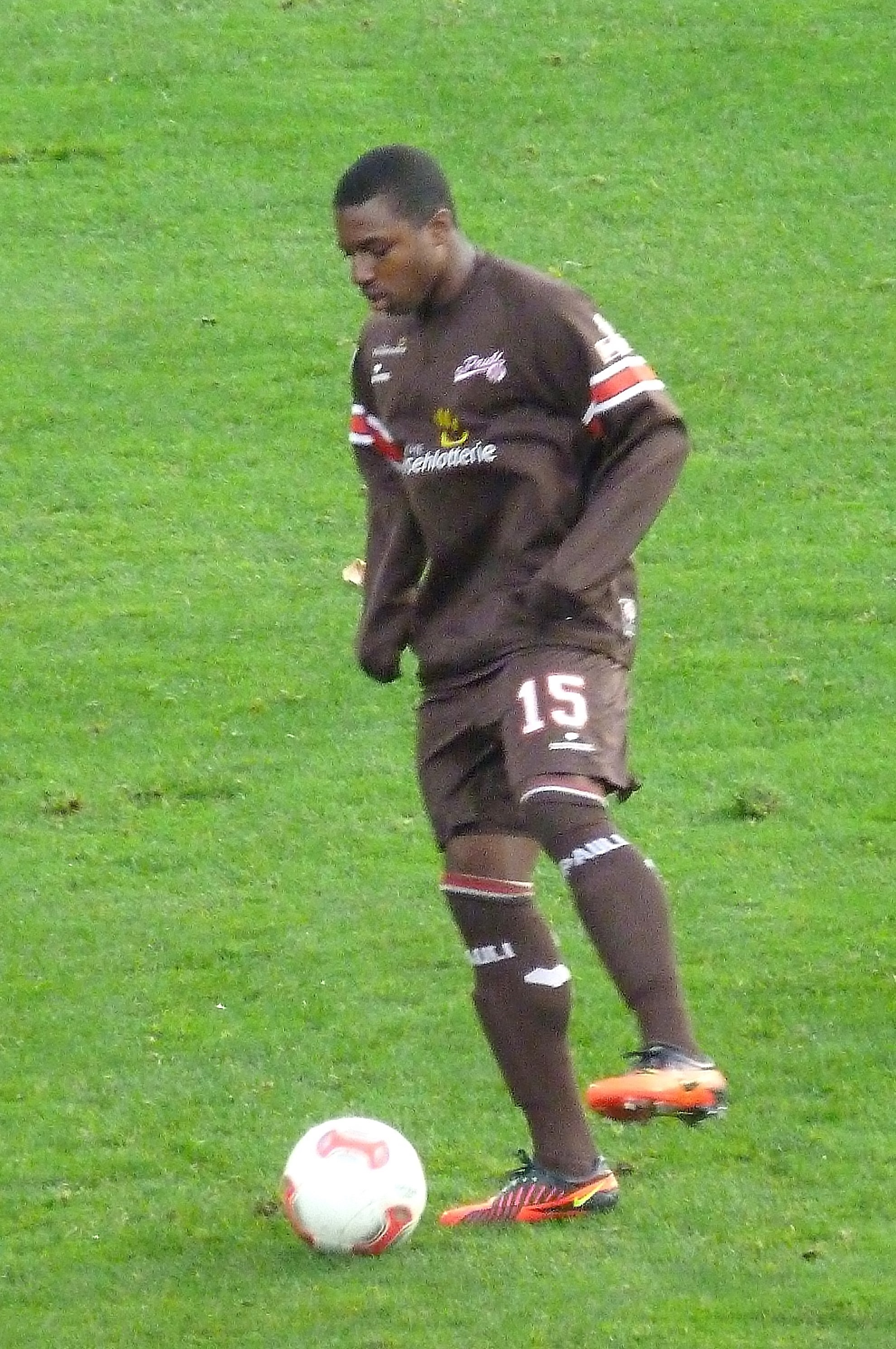
- Gyau with St. Pauli in 2012

Personal information
- Full name: Joseph-Claude Agyeman Gyau
- Date of birth: September 16, 1992 (age 34)
- Place of birth: Tampa, Florida, United States
- Height: 1.75 m (5 ft 9 in)
- Positions: Winger; full-back

Youth career
- 2001–2007: Bethesda Roadrunners
- 2007–2009: IMG Soccer Academy
- 2009–2011: 1899 Hoffenheim

Senior career*
Years	Team	Apps	(Gls)
2011–2014	1899 Hoffenheim II	56	(9)
2012–2014	1899 Hoffenheim	2	(0)
2012–2013	→ FC St. Pauli (loan)	15	(0)
2013	→ FC St. Pauli II (loan)	2	(1)
2014–2016	Borussia Dortmund II	13	(2)
2014–2016	Borussia Dortmund	1	(0)
2017–2018	Sonnenhof Großaspach	46	(6)
2018–2019	MSV Duisburg	20	(2)
2019–2021	FC Cincinnati	51	(1)
2022–2023	Degerfors IF	48	(1)
2024–2025	Las Vegas Lights	38	(2)
Total		294	(24)

International career^{‡}
2007–2009	United States U17	28	(2)
2010–2011	United States U20	4	(4)
2012	United States U23	4	(0)
2014–2019	United States	3	(0)
- * Club domestic league appearances and goals as of October 28, 2025 ‡ National team caps and goals as of June 26, 2021

Joseph-Claude Agyeman Gyau (born September 16, 1992) is an American former professional soccer player who played as a winger. From 2014 through 2019, Gyau represented the United States national team and earned three caps.

== Early life ==
Born in Tampa, Florida, he grew up in Silver Spring, Maryland, where he played youth soccer for the nearby Bethesda Roadrunners before joining the IMG Soccer Academy in 2009. Gyau is of third-generation pedigree of professional footballers, being the son of former U.S. international Phillip Gyau and the grandson of Joseph "Nana" Gyau, a former Ghanaian international.

== Club career ==
Gyau Signed for Hoffenheim with teammate Charles Renken in 2009. The two were under the age of 18 and could not participate in any matches and were loaned to the Vancouver Whitecaps where they were a part of a residency program from 2009 to 2010. After the season in Canada It was agreed upon that the two would start out playing for Hoffenheims U19 squad. Shortly after arriving and leading the team in minutes Gyau was moved up to Hoffenheims U23 in 2011. Gyau, only 18, made numerous appearances catching the eye of the first team and was soon moved up once again. Gyau made his Debut for the first team in a DFB pokal match against Greuther Furth in 2011 at the young age of 19. In April 2012 Gyau would sign His first team contract and In August 2012, Gyau was loaned to 2. Bundesliga side FC St. Pauli from TSG 1899 Hoffenheim for the entire season, with an option for another season. He made his League debut for Hoffenheim in April 2014, coming on in the final 21 minutes of a 0–0 draw against Eintracht Frankfurt. In June 2014, Gyau joined Borussia Dortmund. Initially this would only be for the U23 but shortly after he was moved up to the first team to participate in their preseason. Gyau scored a last minute game winner in a friendly match against Heidenheim. Post preseason Gyau remained with the first team and was a regular in the 18 man roster. On September 24, 2014, he made his first team debut for Borussia Dortmund against VfB Stuttgart, coming on in the 74th minute of the match which ended in a 2–2 draw. After being out with injuries for nearly two years, he made his return with Borussia Dortmund II as a substitute on October 29, 2016.

Following Gyau's return to match fitness in January 2017, Gyau moved to 3. Liga side SG Sonnenhof Großaspach on an 18-month deal. During those 18 months Gyau was able to return to form scoring 6 goals and adding 4 assists, earning himself a summer transfer

Gyau moved to MSV Duisburg for their 2018–19 season in Germany's 2nd Bundesliga, tallying 2 goals and 1 assist during the campaign.

On August 8, 2019, it was announced that Gyau had signed for Major League Soccer side FC Cincinnati. Gyau went on to make 51 total appearances for the club.

Gyau signed with Las Vegas Lights on February 16, 2024.

Following the 2025 season, Gyau announced his retirement from playing professional soccer.

== International career ==
Gyau has been capped for the United States at the U-15, U-17, U-20, and U-23 levels. In March 2012, Gyau was called into the US U-23 team for Olympic qualifying matches. The team did not qualify for that year's Summer Olympics.

In November 2012, Gyau was called up to the United States national team. His first start for the US was on September 3, 2014, against the Czech Republic in a friendly match. Gyau made his second start for the national team on October 10, 2014, in a friendly match against Ecuador. After playing less than 15 minutes, he came off the pitch with a suspected sprained left knee and was replaced by Bobby Wood. On October 12, it was announced that Gyau had torn his lateral meniscus and suffered a bone bruise.

In June 2019, Gyau made his first United States national team appearance since 2014 in a friendly match against Jamaica.

== Career statistics ==
=== Club ===
As of match played November 8, 2020

Appearances and goals by club, season and competition
Club	Season	League			National Cup		Other		Total	
Club	Season	Division	Apps	Goals	Apps	Goals	Apps	Goals	Apps	Goals
1899 Hoffenheim II	2010–11	Regionalliga	7	0	—		—		7	0
1899 Hoffenheim II	2011–12	Regionalliga	22	2	—		—		22	2
1899 Hoffenheim II	2013–14	Regionalliga	27	7	—		—		27	7
1899 Hoffenheim II	Total		56	9	0	0	0	0	56	9
1899 Hoffenheim	2011–12	Bundesliga	0	0	1	0	—		1	0
1899 Hoffenheim	2012–13	Bundesliga	0	0	—		—		0	0
1899 Hoffenheim	2013–14	Bundesliga	2	0	—		—		2	0
1899 Hoffenheim	Total		2	0	1	0	0	0	3	0
FC St. Pauli (loan)	2012–13	2. Bundesliga	15	0	1	0	—		16	0
FC St. Pauli II (loan)	2012–13	Regionalliga	2	1	—		—		2	1
Borussia Dortmund	2014–15	Bundesliga	1	0	—		—		1	0
Borussia Dortmund II	2014–15	3. Liga	11	2	—		—		11	2
Borussia Dortmund II	2015–16	Regionalliga	0	0	—		—		0	0
Borussia Dortmund II	2016–17	Regionalliga	2	0	—		—		2	0
Borussia Dortmund II	Total		13	2	0	0	0	0	13	2
Sonnenhof Großaspach	2016–17	3. Liga	16	1	—		—		16	1
Sonnenhof Großaspach	2017–18	3. Liga	30	5	—		—		30	5
Sonnenhof Großaspach	Total		46	6	0	0	0	0	46	6
MSV Duisburg	2018–19	2. Bundesliga	20	2	0	0	—		20	2
FC Cincinnati	2019	Major League Soccer	8	0	—		—		8	0
FC Cincinnati	2020	Major League Soccer	21	1	—		1 (Note: Appearance(s) in MLS is Back Tournament)	0	22	1
FC Cincinnati	Total		29	1	0	0	1	0	30	1
Career total			184	21	2	0	1	0	187	21
