= Carmen Holinka =

German association football player

Personal information
- Date of birth: 16 December 1968 (age 57)
- Place of birth: Ludwigsburg, Germany
- Position: Forward

Carmen Holinka (born 16 December 1968) is a former German football player and coach who played for Grün-Weiß Brauweiler.

== Honours ==
- German football champions: 1997
- DFB-Pokal: 1997
