= Gyöngyi Lovász =

Hungarian football player

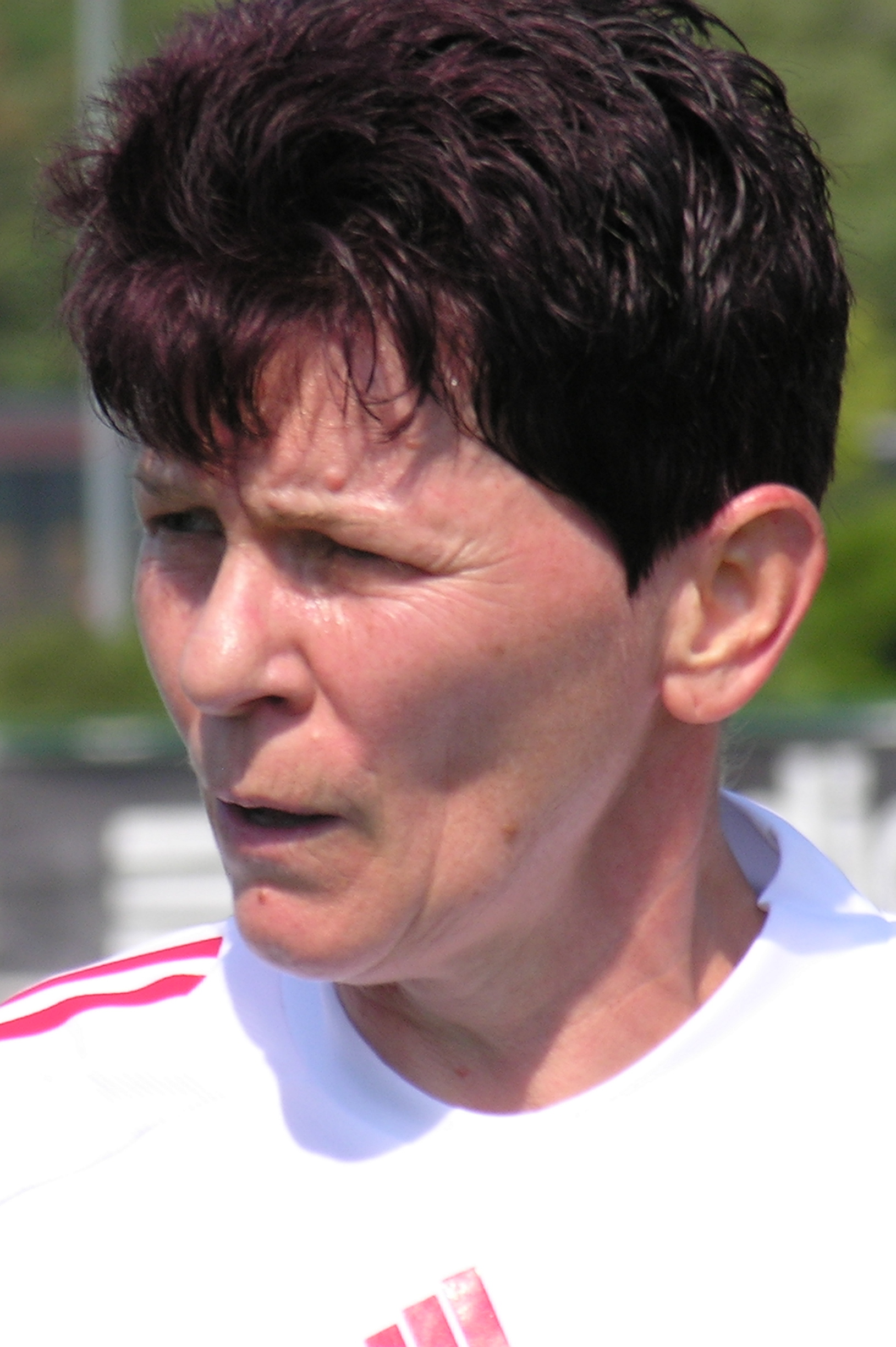
- Gyöngyi Lovász in 2017

Personal information
- Date of birth: 24 October 1959 (age 67)
- Place of birth: Dorog, Hungary
- Position: Midfielder

International career
Years	Team	Apps	(Gls)
1985–1988	Hungary	21	(6)

Gyöngyi Lovász (born 24 October 1959) is a retired Hungarian footballer who played as a midfielder for Grün-Weiß Brauweiler. She participated in the first official Hungary women's national team match in 1985 against West Germany.

== International career ==
Gyöngyi Lovász represented Hungary 21 times and scored 6 goals.

== Honours ==
Grün-Weiß Brauweiler

- German Cup: 1990–91, 1993–94
- DFB-Supercup Frauen: 1994

== Literature ==
- Ki kicsoda a magyar sportéletben?: II. kötet (I–R). Szekszárd: Babits. 1995 page 250. o. ISBN 978-963-495-011-0
- Futball '93. Budapest: Egyetemi Nyomda. 1994. ISBN 0369000472737
