= Manuela Schultealbert =

German footballer

Personal information
- Full name: Manuela Schultealbert
- Birth name: Manuela Schlamann
- Date of birth: 15 January 1973 (age 53)
- Place of birth: Ochtrup, Germany
- Height: 1.68 m (5 ft 6 in)
- Position: Defender

Senior career*
| Years | Team | Apps | (Gls) |
| 1989–2001 | Heike Rheine Women's | | |

International career
- Germany
- * Club domestic league appearances and goals

Manuela Schultealbert (née Schlamann; born 15 January 1973) is a retired German women's international footballer who played as a defender. She was a member of the Germany women's national football team. She participated at the UEFA Women's Euro 1993.
