= Sebastian Neumann =

German footballer

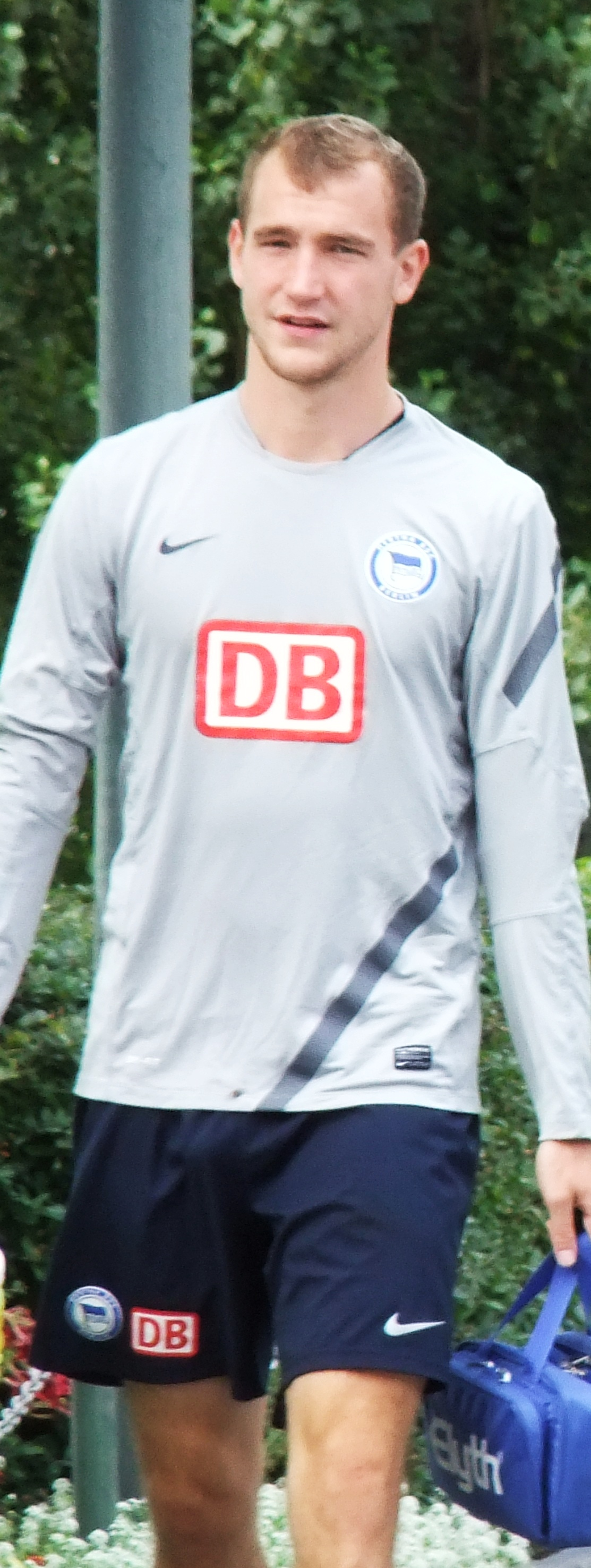
- Neumann at practice with Hertha BSC in 2011

Personal information
- Date of birth: 18 February 1991 (age 35)
- Place of birth: Berlin, Germany
- Height: 1.88 m (6 ft 2 in)
- Position: Defender

Team information
- Current team: Würzburger Kickers (sporting director)

Youth career
- 1995: BFC Südring
- –2001: FC Internationale Berlin
- 2001–2009: Hertha BSC

Senior career*
Years	Team	Apps	(Gls)
2009–2012	Hertha BSC II	42	(1)
2010–2012	Hertha BSC	13	(0)
2012–2014	VfL Osnabrück	59	(3)
2014–2016	VfR Aalen	33	(3)
2016–2018	Würzburger Kickers	66	(5)
2018–2019	MSV Duisburg	9	(0)
Total		222	(12)

International career
2008–2009	Germany U-18	9	(2)
2009–2010	Germany U-19	6	(0)
2010–2012	Germany U-21	11	(1)

Managerial career
- 2020–2021: Würzburger Kickers (U19 director)
- 2021: Würzburger Kickers (caretaker)
- 2021–: Würzburger Kickers (sporting director)
- 2024: Würzburger Kickers (caretaker)
- 2025: Würzburger Kickers (caretaker)
- * Club domestic league appearances and goals

Sebastian Neumann (born 18 February 1991) is a German football coach, official and a former defender. He is the sporting director of Würzburger Kickers.

== Playing career ==
Neumann made his debut for Hertha's first team on 14 August 2010 in a DFB-Pokal match against SC Pfullendorf, and played his first league game on 22 October 2010 in a 2–0 home win over SpVgg Greuther Fürth. He signed for VfL Osnabrück in August 2012. He joined VfR Aalen two years later.

Neumann won his first cap for the German U-21 team on 11 October 2010 against Ukraine.

He moves to MSV Duisburg for the 2018–19 season.

On 2 January 2020, he retired due to injuries.

== Coaching career ==
He was appointed as the interim manager of Würzburger Kickers on 4 October 2021 but was replaced by Danny Schwarz nine days later.

He was appointed as caretaker manager by Würzburger Kickers once again on 24 April 2025.
