= Claudia Mandrysch =

German footballer

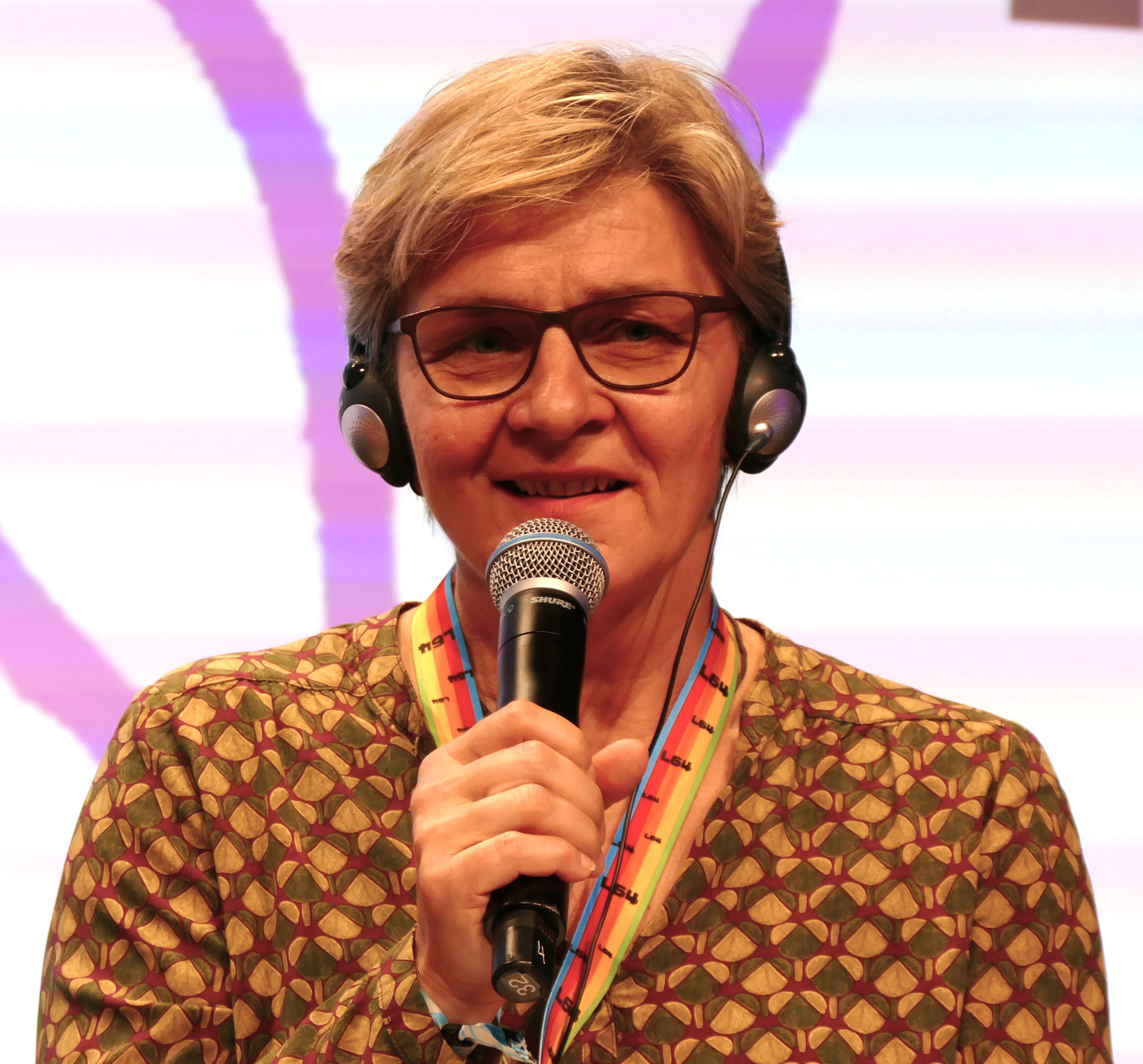
- Mandrysch in 2024

Personal information
- Date of birth: 27 September 1969 (age 57)
- Height: 1.73 m (5 ft 8 in)
- Position: Defender

International career
Years	Team	Apps	(Gls)
1995	Germany	2	(0)

Claudia Mandrysch (born 27 September 1969) is a German former footballer who played as a defender. She made two appearances for the Germany national team in 1995.
