= 1997–98 Frauen-Bundesliga =

Frauen-Bundesliga
- Season: 1997–98
- Champions: FSV Frankfurt; 1st Bundesliga title 2nd German title
- Relegated: Hamburg; Klinge Seckach
- Goals: 459
- Average goals/game: 3.48
- Top goalscorer: (Germany) Birgit Prinz (23)

The 1997–98 Frauen-Bundesliga was the eighth season of the Frauen-Bundesliga, Germany's premier football league. It began on 17 August 1997 and ended on 7 June 1998. It was the first season in which the Bundesliga used the modern system of one united league on the national level instead of a southern and northern division as in the years before.

FSV Frankfurt finished the season as champions, finishing six points ahead of runners-up SG Praunheim.

== Final standings ==
Pos	Team	Pld	W	D	L	GF	GA	GD	Pts	Relegation
1	FSV Frankfurt	22	18	2	2	80	19	+61	56	1997–98 Bundesliga (women) champions
2	SG Praunheim	22	16	2	4	58	22	+36	50	
3	FCR Duisburg	22	15	2	5	57	22	+35	47	
4	Grün-Weiß Brauweiler (Note: 1996–97 Bundesliga (women) champion)	22	12	3	7	35	28	+7	39	
5	Sportfreunde Siegen	22	12	2	8	46	23	+23	38	
6	SSV Turbine Potsdam	22	9	3	10	34	43	−9	30	
7	FC Eintracht Rheine	22	9	2	11	28	32	−4	29	
8	1. FC Saarbrücken	22	9	2	11	32	41	−9	29	
9	TuS Niederkirchen	22	5	5	12	26	44	−18	20	
10	SC 07 Bad Neuenahr (Note: Promoted from the 2. Bundesliga (women) last season)	22	5	4	13	23	49	−26	19	
11	SC Klinge Seckach	22	5	3	14	23	58	−35	18	Will be relegated to the 2. Bundesliga (women)
12	Hamburger SV	22	1	2	19	17	78	−61	5	Will be relegated to the 2. Bundesliga (women)

Source: RSSSF

== Results ==
Home \ Away	FSV	SGP	DUI	GWB	SFS	POT	HRH	SAR	NIE	NEU	KLS	HSV
FSV Frankfurt		0–2	3–1	5–0	5–1	1–0	2–0	6–2	3–0	9–1	7–0	11–2
SG Praunheim	0–5		1–0	3–1	1–1	7–1	3–0	2–0	4–2	6–1	3–1	6–0
FCR Duisburg	4–1	1–3		3–0	2–1	1–3	0–0	1–0	7–0	3–0	5–1	6–1
Grün-Weiß Brauweiler	1–2	1–2	0–1		1–0	1–0	1–2	1–1	2–2	2–0	3–2	3–0
Sportfreunde Siegen	1–1	0–1	0–1	1–2		6–0	4–0	4–2	3–1	3–0	5–0	1–0
SSV Turbine Potsdam	2–4	0–0	0–3	2–2	0–4		0–1	0–1	2–1	4–1	6–2	4–2
FC Eintracht Rheine	1–4	1–0	1–5	0–1	1–2	0–1		1–2	2–0	4–0	3–0	3–0
1. FC Saarbrücken	1–4	0–3	3–2	1–2	1–0	1–3	2–1		0–0	3–0	0–1	2–0
TuS Niederkirchen	0–1	2–1	2–2	0–2	0–3	4–2	0–1	4–1		1–2	0–2	4–2
SC 07 Bad Neuenahr	0–2	0–1	1–2	1–2	0–2	0–0	4–2	3–1	0–0		5–1	1–1
SC Klinge Seckach	0–0	3–1	1–3	0–5	2–1	1–2	1–1	2–5	0–1	0–0		3–0
Hamburger SV	0–4	2–8	0–4	0–2	2–3	0–2	0–2	0–3	1–3	2–2	2–0	

Source: RSSSF
Legend: Blue = home team win; Yellow = draw; Red = away team win.

== Top scorers ==
	Player	Team	Goals
1	(Germany) Birgit Prinz	FSV Frankfurt	23
2	(Germany) Sandra Smisek	FSV Frankfurt	20
3	(Germany) Inka Grings	FCR Duisburg	13
3	(Germany) Thekla Krause	Sportfreunde Siegen	13
3	(Germany) Claudia Müller	WSV Wendschott	13
3	(Poland) Jolanta Nieczypor	FCR Duisburg	13
