= Jan-Luca Rumpf =

German footballer

Personal information
- Date of birth: 8 July 1999 (age 27)
- Place of birth: Wiesbaden, Germany
- Height: 1.90 m (6 ft 3 in)
- Position: Centre-back

Team information
- Current team: Sportfreunde Siegen
- Number: 13

Youth career
- –2016: Eintracht Frankfurt
- 2016–2017: Wehen Wiesbaden
- 2017–2018: Hannover 96

Senior career*
Years	Team	Apps	(Gls)
2018–2019	Hannover 96 II	0	(0)
2019	Sportfreunde Siegen	16	(1)
2019–2020	SC Paderborn II	20	(2)
2019–2020	SC Paderborn	1	(0)
2020–2023	Fortuna Köln	85	(2)
2023–2025	Alemannia Aachen	56	(0)
2025–	Sportfreunde Siegen	32	(2)
- * Club domestic league appearances and goals as of 23 September 2026

Jan-Luca Rumpf (born 8 July 1999) is a German professional footballer who plays as a centre-back for Regionalliga West club Sportfreunde Siegen.

== Career ==
Rumpf made his professional debut for SC Paderborn in the Bundesliga on 13 June 2020, starting in the home match against Werder Bremen.
