= Jolanta Nieczypor =

Polish footballer (born 1967)

Personal information
- Date of birth: 13 December 1967 (age 58)
- Height: 1.65 m (5 ft 5 in)
- Position: Midfielder

Senior career*
Years	Team	Apps	(Gls)
1986–1991	AZS AWF Wrocław		
1991–1994	VfB Rheine		
1994–1995	Eintracht Wolfsburg		
1995–1999	FCR 2001 Duisburg		
1999–2003	WSV Wolfsburg-Wendschott		

International career
1990–1999	Poland	36	(17)
- * Club domestic league appearances and goals

Jolanta Nieczypor (born 13 December 1967) is a Polish former footballer who played as a midfielder.

== Career statistics ==
=== International ===
Appearances and goals by national team and year
National team	Year	Apps	Goals
Poland	1990	4	1
Poland	1991	7	4
Poland	1992	3	0
Poland	1993	3	0
Poland	1994	2	0
Poland	1995	2	3
Poland	1996	2	2
Poland	1997	4	4
Poland	1998	4	2
Poland	1999	5	1
Total		36	17

== Honours ==
FCR 2001 Duisburg

- German Cup: 1997–98
