= Sportfreunde Siegen =

German association football club

- Full name: Sportfreunde Siegen von 1899 e.V.
- Founded: 8 September 1899; 127 years ago
- Ground: Leimbachstadion
- Capacity: 18,500
- Chairman: Roland Schöler
- Manager: Volkan Uluç
- League: Regionalliga West
- 2025–26: Regionalliga West, 7th of 18
Home colours	Away colours

Sportfreunde Siegen von 1899 e. V. is a German association football club based in Siegen, North Rhine-Westphalia. The club competes in the Regionalliga West, the fourth tier of the German football league system.

Sportfreunde Siegen was founded on 8 September 1899 as Fußballclub Jahn Siegen, originating as the football department of Turnverein Jahn Siegen 1879. In 1923, it merged with Sportverein 07 Siegen to form its modern identity. Aside from a brief period following the Second World War, the club has operated continuously under its current name since then.

The team won the German Amateur Championship in 1955 and reached the professional ranks in the early 2000s, including a single season in the 2. Bundesliga in 2005–06. In the following years, Sportfreunde Siegen experienced significant fluctuations between the fourth and fifth divisions, including insolvency proceedings in 2008 and 2017. After several seasons in the lower leagues, the club earned promotion back to the Regionalliga West in 2025.

The club plays its home matches at the Leimbachstadion, a multi-purpose stadium in Siegen with a capacity of 18,500 spectators.

== History ==
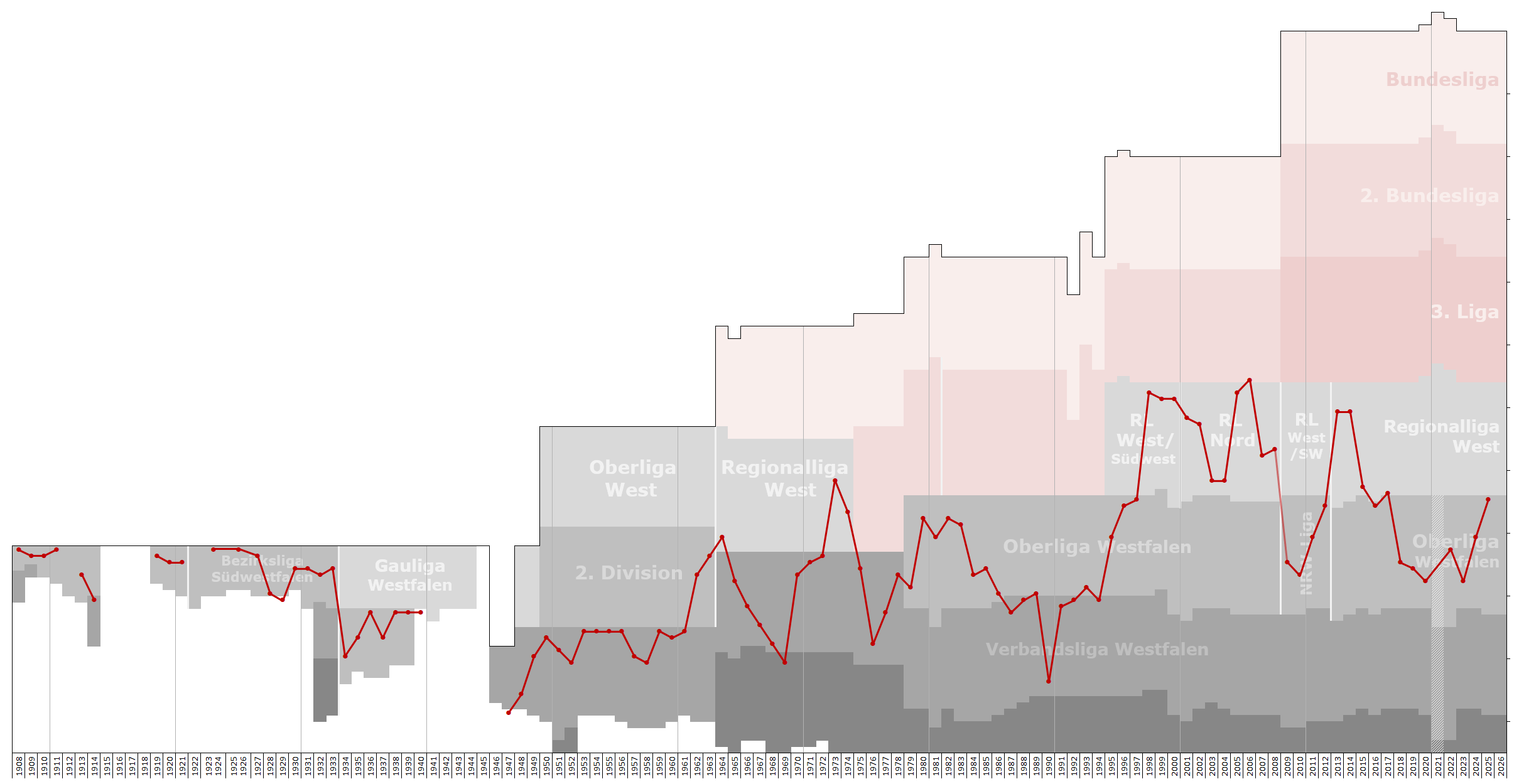
Historical chart of the club's league performance

=== The early years ===
The club was founded in 1899 as the football department of a gymnastics club called Turnverein Jahn von 1879 Siegen, being one of the first clubs in Western Germany to offer organized football to its members. In 1923, it merged with Sportverein 07 Siegen to become an independent football club called Sportfreunde Siegen von 1899.

The 1920s also marked the club's first ascension to the national level, competing in the Western German championship after claiming the crown in the district league four times in a row. Despite these results, the team did not qualify for the first division when German football was re-organized in the Third Reich. After World War II, the club initially could not match its pre-war successes until it won the German amateur championship in 1955 with a stunning 5–0 win over 05 Bad Homburg.

Two years later, Sportfreunde captain Herbert Schäfer was called up by national coach Sepp Herberger to play for the German national team. In 1954, Schäfer had been the last player being cut from the team which went on to win the World Cup. To this day, Herbert Schäfer still ranks as one of the best players to ever wear a Sportfreunde jersey.

Six years after winning the German amateur championship, Sportfreunde Siegen made the jump to professional football in 1961. When the Bundesliga was introduced in 1963, the club settled in the Regionalliga, which was the second highest division at the time. League games against renowned clubs such as Bayer Leverkusen, Fortuna Düsseldorf or Borussia Mönchengladbach were common during these days.

After some years of struggle, Sportfreunde Siegen fought its way back to professional football in 1972, claiming the West German amateur championship and promoting to the second-tier Regionalliga once again. Siegen remained on the professional stage for two more years before the introduction of the 2. Bundesliga forced the club to withdraw from this level in 1974. For the following twelve years, Sportfreunde Siegen continuously played in Germany's third division. After several ups and downs in the late 1980s and early '90s, the club made it back to third-tier Regionalliga in 1997, narrowly missing out on the promotion to the 2. Bundesliga by one game in 1999. In the same year, the team advanced to the quarter-finals of the DFB-Pokal, the German cup, before losing to Bundesliga side VfL Wolfsburg in a highly contested match.

=== Recent history ===
Club logo until 2015

The first decade of the new millennium turned out to be the most eventful in the club's rich history. After a last-minute victory on the last match day of the 2004–05 campaign, the club was finally promoted to 2. Bundesliga. Local hero and future German international Patrick Helmes led the team with 21 goals.

The following season saw the refurbishment of Leimbachstadion, the club's home ground since 1957, to its current capacity of 18,700 and quite decent results in the first half of the 2005–06 campaign in the 2. Bundesliga. German football heavyweight VfL Bochum was beaten 3–0, as was SC Freiburg. However, after a lacklustre performance in the second half of the season, the team was not able to avoid relegation. Two years later, Sportfreunde Siegen had to file for insolvency after failing to qualify for the newly established 3. Liga. The club managed to resume operations in fifth-division NRW-Liga. It returned to the Regionalliga West with the 2012–13 campaign and came in fifth in its first season back in semi-professional football, repeating this result in the following season. The team finished second-last in the Regionalliga in 2015 and was relegated from the league but bounced back immediately by winning the Oberliga Westfalen championship. Following another relegation they have been again playing in the Oberliga since 2017.

== Honours ==
The club's honours:

- German amateur championship
  - Winners: 1955
- Oberliga Westfalen
  - Champions: 1997, 2016
- Westphalia Cup
  - Runners-up: 2003, 2004, 2014

== Current squad ==
As of 8 September 2026

Note: Flags indicate national team as defined under FIFA eligibility rules; some limited exceptions apply. Players may hold more than one non-FIFA nationality.

No.	Pos.	Nation	Player
1	GK	GER	Marcel Johnen
2	DF	JPN	Rikuhei Nabesaka
5	DF	GER	Tom Gutsch
6	FW	GER	Leon Pursian
7	FW	GER	Shaibou Oubeyapwa
8	MF	GER	Matonda-Glody Ngyombo
9	FW	GER	Serhat-Semih Güler
10	FW	GER	Lucas Cueto
11	FW	ALB	Elsamed Ramaj
12	GK	GER	Moritz Schrief
13	DF	GER	Jan-Luca Rumpf
14	MF	GER	Ömer Tokaç
17	DF	GER	Tim Arnold (on loan from Darmstadt)

No.	Pos.	Nation	Player
18	FW	GER	Arif Güclü
20	GK	GER	Pascal Manitz
21	MF	GER	Eros Dacaj
24	DF	GER	Michel Stöcker
27	FW	GER	Kevin Goden
28	FW	GER	Hassan El-Chaabi
29	FW	GER	Elias Huth
30	FW	GER	Dustin Willms
31	MF	GER	Konstantin Gerhardt
34	MF	GER	Dennis Brock
37	MF	GER	Hamza Saghiri
42	DF	GER	Florian Mayer

=== Out on loan ===
Note: Flags indicate national team as defined under FIFA eligibility rules; some limited exceptions apply. Players may hold more than one non-FIFA nationality.

No. / Pos. / Nation / Player	No. / Pos. / Nation / Player

== Former managers ==
- (Germany) Gerd vom Bruch (1986–1987)
- (Germany) Ingo Peter (1994–2003)
- (Germany) Michael Feichtenbeiner (2003–2004)
- (Germany) Gerhard Noll (2004)
- (Germany) Ralf Loose (2004–2005)
- (Czech Republic) Jan Kocian (2005–2006)
- (Germany) Uwe Helmes (2006)
- (Germany) Hannes Bongartz (2006)
- (Czech Republic) Ladislav Biro (2006)
- (Germany) Ralf Loose (2006–2007)
- (Germany) Marc Fascher (2007–2008)
- (Slovakia) Peter Németh (2008–2009)
- (Netherlands) Rob Delahaye (2009–2010)
- (Poland) Andrzej Rudy (Jun 2010–2011)
- (Germany) Michael Boris (2011–2014)
- (Germany) Matthias Hagner (2014)
- (Germany) Michael Boris (2014–2015)
- (Germany) Ottmar Griffel (2015–2016)
- (Germany) Thorsten Seibert (2016–2017)
- (Germany) Dominik Dapprich (2017–2019)
- (Germany) Tobias Cramer (2019–2022)
- (Germany) Lirian Gerguri (2022)
- (Germany) Patrick Helmes (2023)
- (Germany) Thorsten Nehrbauer (2023–2025)
- (Germany) Boris Schommers (2025–2026)
- (Turkey) Volkan Uluç (2026–)

== Women's football ==
In 1996 the women's department of TSV Siegen moved to the Sportfreunde. At that time the team had been the most successful team in the Bundesliga. Since the team was denied a license for the 2001–02 Bundesliga season they have not returned to the Bundesliga, moving between second and third league. In the 2008–09 season they have played in the Regionalliga (III), were relegated to the fourth tier Verbandsliga Westfalen in 2009–10 but managed direct promotion to the Regionalliga West for the 2010–11 season.

=== Honours ===
All the honours were gained when the women's department was still a part of TSV Siegen.

- German women's champions: 1987, 1990, 1991, 1992, 1994, 1996
- Women's German Cup champions: 1986, 1987, 1988, 1989, 1993

=== Sportfreunde Siegen (women’s football) All time Table ===
All time Table from 1996-97 to 2023/2024 seasons

German Site

Season	League	Place	MP(SP)	W(S)	D(U)	L(V)	GF	GA	GD	PTS	DFB CUP
1996/97	Bundesliga North	3rd	18	13	1	4	52	15	+37	40	
1997/98	Frauen-Bundesliga	5th	22	12	2	8	46	23	+23	38	Halbfinale
1998/99	Frauen-Bundesliga	3rd	22	10	7	5	32	28	+4	37	Achtelfinale
1999/00	Frauen-Bundesliga	3rd	22	13	3	6	48	28	+20	42	Final
2000/01	Frauen-Bundesliga	8th	22	7	5	10	28	46	−18	26	Round of 16
2001/02	Regional League West	2nd	24	15	5	4	79	39	+40	50	1st round
2002/03	Regional League West	13th	24	3	2	19	41	89	-48	11	not qualified
2003/04	Westphalia League	2nd	28	21	5	2	110	40	+70	68	not qualified
2004/05	Regional League West	6th	22	11	4	7	71	51	20	37	not qualified
2005/06	Regional League West	6th	22	9	3	10	32	42	-10	30	not qualified
2006/07	Regional League West	8th	22	7	5	10	30	36	-6	26	not qualified
2007/08	Regional League West	7th	20	7	6	7	26	30	-4	27	not qualified
2008/09	Regional League West	12th	26	8	5	13	34	43	-9	29	not qualified
2009/10	Westphalia League	1st	26	25	1	0	98	18	80	76	not qualified
2010/11	Regional League West	3rd	26	13	4	9	56	41	15	43	not qualified
2011/12	Regional League West	4th	24	13	5	6	46	33	13	44	not qualified
2012/13	Regional League West	9th	24	8	5	11	43	44	-1	29	1st round
2013/14	Regional League West	6th	26	13	2	11	55	60	-5	61	1st round
2014/15	Regional League West	10th	26	9	4	13	54	67	-13	31	not qualified
2015/16	Regional League West	12th	26	7	2	17	34	72	-38	23	not qualified
2016/17	Westphalia League	3rd	28	19	3	6	82	37	45	60	not qualified
2017/18	Westphalia League	4th	24	14	6	4	96	36	60	48	not qualified
2019/20	Westphalia League	1st	15	12	1	2	55	11	45	37	not qualified
2018/19	Westphalia League	3rd	26	16	3	7	82	37	45	51	not qualified
2019/20	Westphalia League	1st	15	12	1	2	55	11	44	37	not qualified
2020/21	Regional League West	1st	6	5	1	0	22	7	15	16	not qualified
2020/21	Regionalliga West playoff round	1st	3	2	0	1	5	1	-4	6	not qualified
2021/22	Regional League West	9th	28	12	5	11	63	70	-7	41	Round of 16
2022/23	Regional League West	9th	24	9	0	15	33	53	-20	27	not qualified
2023/24	Regional League West	Withdrawal, no play									

Green --> promoted

Orange --> relegated
