= TSV Crailsheim =

German football club

- Full name: Turn- und Sportverein; Crailsheim 1846 e.V.
- Founded: 1846
- Ground: Schönebürgstadion
- Capacity: 5,500
- President: Klaus Jürgen Mümmler
- Head coach: Christian Isert (women); Patrick Neumann (men)
- League: Landesliga Württemberg 1 (VII)
- 2015–16: 3rd
- Website: http://www.tsvcrailsheim.de/
Home colours	Away colours

TSV Crailsheim is a German association football club from the town of Crailsheim, Baden-Württemberg.

== History ==
Founded as the gymnastics club Turnverein Crailsheim in 1846, the association today has over 3,000 members in 20 departments, including athletics, basketball, cycling, dance sport, fistball, fencing, fitness, football, handball, jujutsu, judo, rehabilitation sport, swimming, table tennis, and tennis.

Several of the teams representing the club have enjoyed success: the women's football side plays in the 2. Bundesliga, the men's basketball team in the 2. Basketball-Bundesliga Süd, and the men's footballers in the Oberliga Baden-Württemberg (IV).

TSV was promoted to the Verbandsliga Württemberg (V) in 2001 and then advanced to the Oberliga Baden-Württemberg in 2003. In their first season at that level they narrowly missed quick promotion to the Regionalliga Süd (III) when they finished just one point behind FC Nöttingen.

After seven Oberliga seasons, the club suffered relegation in 2010 and decided to withdraw to the tier eight Bezirksliga Hohenlohe instead. After four seasons at this level the club won promotion back to the Landesliga Württemberg in 2014.

== Honors ==
The club's honours:

- Verbandsliga Württemberg (V)
  - Champions: 2003
- Bezirksliga Hohenlohe (VIII)
  - Champions: 2014

== Former Players ==
- (United States) Jeanette Dyer
- (Croatia) Allison Scurich
- (New Zealand) Rachel Howard
- (Hungary) Fanny Vágó

== Recent seasons ==
The recent season-by-season performance of the club:

Season	Division	Tier	Position
2000–01	Landesliga Württemberg	VI	↑
2001–02	Verbandsliga Württemberg	V	4th
2002–03	Verbandsliga Württemberg	V	1st ↑
2003–04	Oberliga Baden-Württemberg	IV	2nd
2004–05	Oberliga Baden-Württemberg	IV	6th
2005–06	Oberliga Baden-Württemberg	IV	11th
2006–07	Oberliga Baden-Württemberg	IV	6th
2007–08	Oberliga Baden-Württemberg	IV	7th
2008–09	Oberliga Baden-Württemberg	V	13th
2009–10	Oberliga Baden-Württemberg	V	17th ↓
2010–11	Bezirksliga Hohenlohe	VIII	3rd
2011–12	Bezirksliga Hohenlohe	VIII	5th
2012–13	Bezirksliga Hohenlohe	VIII	4th
2013–14	Bezirksliga Hohenlohe	VIII	1st ↑
2014–15	Landesliga Württemberg 1	VII	2nd
2015–16	Landesliga Württemberg 1	VII	3rd
2016–17	Landesliga Württemberg 1	VII	

- With the introduction of the Regionalligas in 1994 and the 3. Liga in 2008 as the new third tier, below the 2. Bundesliga, all leagues below dropped one tier.

↑ Promoted	↓ Relegated
