= Claudia Klein =

German footballer

Personal information
- Date of birth: 24 September 1971 (age 55)
- Position: Defender

Senior career*
Years	Team	Apps	(Gls)
- Grün-Weiß Brauweiler

International career^{‡}
	Germany	4	
- * Club domestic league appearances and goals ‡ National team caps and goals as of 5 June 1995 (before the 1995 FIFA Women's World Cup)

Claudia Klein (born 24 September 1971) is a German women's international footballer who plays as a defender. She is a member of the Germany women's national football team. She was part of the team at the 1995 FIFA Women's World Cup. On club level she plays for Grün-Weiß Brauweiler in Germany.
