= 2014–15 MSV Duisburg season =

MSV Duisburg
2014–15 season
- Manager: Gino Lettieri
- 3. Liga: 2nd place
- DFB-Pokal: Second round
- Niederrheinpokal: Semifinals
- Top goalscorer: League: Zlatko Janjić (17); All: Zlatko Janjić (19)
- Highest home attendance: 31,002 (vs Kiel, 16 May 2015)
- Lowest home attendance: 10,081 (vs Regensburg, 5 December 2014)
- Average home league attendance: 13,211
Home colours	Away colours	Third colours

The 2014–15 MSV Duisburg season was the 115th season in the club's football history. In 2014–15 the club played in the 3. Liga, the third tier of German football.

Duisburg was secured promotion to the 2. Bundesliga on 16 May 2015.

== Players ==
=== Team ===
Note: Flags indicate national team as defined under FIFA eligibility rules; some limited exceptions apply. Players may hold more than one non-FIFA nationality.

No.	Pos.	Nation	Player
1	GK	GER	Michael Ratajczak
2	DF	GER	Matthias Kühne
3	DF	GER	Enis Hajri
4	DF	GER	Christopher Schorch
5	DF	BIH	Branimir Bajić
6	MF	GER	Martin Dausch
7	DF	GER	Sascha Dum
8	MF	GER	Deniz Aycicek
9	MF	GER	Pierre de Wit
10	FW	NGA	Kingsley Onuegbu (Vice captain)
11	MF	GER	Michael Gardawski
13	FW	GER	Zlatko Janjić
14	MF	GER	Tim Albutat (Loaned from SC Freiburg)
15	DF	GER	Erik Wille

No.	Pos.	Nation	Player
16	FW	GER	Gökhan Lekesiz
17	MF	GER	Kevin Wolze
18	DF	GER	Barkin Cömert
19	MF	GER	Nico Klotz
20	MF	GER	Dennis Grote
21	MF	VEN	Rolf Feltscher
22	GK	GER	Maurice Schumacher
23	MF	GER	Fabian Schnellhardt
25	DF	GER	Thomas Meißner
27	DF	GER	Babacar M'Bengue
28	MF	GER	Steffen Bohl (captain)
30	GK	GER	Marcel Lenz
33	FW	GER	Kevin Scheidhauer

=== Transfers ===
==== In ====
No.	Pos.	Nat.	Name	Age	EU	Moving from	Type	Transfer window	Ends	Transfer fee	Source
3	DF	(Germany)	Enis Hajri	31	EU	1. FC Kaiserslautern (Germany)	Signing	Summer	2015	Free	
4	DF	(Germany)	Christopher Schorch	25	EU	VfL Bochum (Germany)	Signing	Summer	2016	Free	
13	MF	(Germany)	Zlatko Janjić	28	EU	Erzgebirge Aue (Germany)	Signing	Summer	2017	Free	
14	MF	(Germany)	Tim Albutat	21	EU	SC Freiburg (Germany)	Loan	Summer	2016	Free	
15	MF	(Germany)	Erik Wille	21	EU	Eintracht Frankfurt (Germany)	Signing	Summer	2016	Free	
16	FW	(Germany)	Gökhan Lekesiz	23	EU	Youth system	Promoted	Summer	2015	Free	
18	DF	(Germany)	Barkin Cömert	20	EU	Youth system	Promoted	Summer	2016	Free	
19	MF	(Germany)	Nico Klotz	26	EU	SV Sandhausen (Germany)	Signing	Summer	2016	Free	
20	MF	(Germany)	Dennis Grote	27	EU	Preußen Münster (Germany)	Signing	Summer	2016	Free	
21	MF	(Venezuela)	Rolf Feltscher	23	EU	Free agent	Signing	Summer	2015	Free	
23	MF	(Germany)	Fabian Schnellhardt	20	EU	1. FC Köln (Germany)	Signing	Summer	2017	Free	
25	DF	(Germany)	Thomas Meißner	21	EU	Borussia Dortmund (Germany)	Signing	Summer	2016	Free	
28	MF	(Germany)	Steffen Bohl	30	EU	Energie Cottbus (Germany)	Signing	Summer	2016	Free	
33	FW	(Germany)	Kevin Scheidhauer	22	EU	VfL Wolfsburg (Germany)	Signing	Summer	2016	Undisclosed	
6	MF	(Germany)	Martin Dausch	28	EU	Union Berlin (Germany)	Signing	Winter	2016	Free	

==== Out ====
No.	Pos.	Nat.	Name	Age	EU	Moving to	Type	Transfer window	Transfer fee	Source
	DF	(Germany)	Markus Bollmann	33	EU	SC Wiedenbrück	End of contract	Summer	Free	
	DF	(Ghana)	Phil Ofosu-Ayeh	22	Non-EU	VfR Aalen	End of contract	Summer	Free	
	MF	(Greece)	Athanasios Tsourakis	24	EU	Platanias (Greece)	End of contract	Summer	Free	
	FW	(Germany)	Gerrit Wegkamp	21	EU	Fortuna Düsseldorf	End of loan	Summer	Free	
	MF	(Germany)	Tobias Feisthammel	26	EU	SV Elversberg	End of contract	Summer	Free	
	DF	(Germany)	Jens Wissing	26	EU		Retired			
	DF	(Germany)	Christian Eichner	31	EU		End of contract	Summer	Free	
	MF	(Canada)	Nikolas Ledgerwood	29	Non-EU	Energie Cottbus	End of contract	Summer	Free	
	FW	(Burkina Faso)	Patrick Zoundi	31	Non-EU	1. FC Saarbrücken	End of contract	Summer	Free	
	DF	(Germany)	Maximilian Güll	19	EU	Borussia Dortmund	End of contract	Summer	Free	
	FW	(Germany)	Julien Rybacki	18	EU	Fortuna Düsseldorf	End of contract	Summer	Free	
	MF	(Turkey)	Erdoğan Yeşilyurt	20	EU	Altınordu A.Ş.	Signing	Summer	Free	
	MF	(Germany)	Tanju Öztürk	25	EU	Schalke 04 II	Released	Winter	Free	

== Results ==
=== 3. Liga ===
==== League table ====
Pos	Team	Pld	W	D	L	GF	GA	GD	Pts	Promotion, qualification or relegation
1	Arminia Bielefeld (C, P)	38	22	8	8	75	41	+34	74	Promotion to 2. Bundesliga and qualification for DFB-Pokal
2	MSV Duisburg (P)	38	20	11	7	63	40	+23	71	Promotion to 2. Bundesliga and qualification for DFB-Pokal
3	Holstein Kiel	38	18	13	7	53	30	+23	67	Qualification for promotion play-offs and DFB-Pokal
4	Stuttgarter Kickers	38	18	11	9	61	47	+14	65	Qualification for DFB-Pokal
5	Chemnitzer FC	38	17	8	13	44	36	+8	59	

Source: DFB
Rules for classification: 1) Points; 2) Goal difference; 3) Goals scored
(C) Champions; (P) Promoted

==== Results summary ====
Overall								Home						Away					
Pld	W	D	L	GF	GA	GD	Pts	W	D	L	GF	GA	GD	W	D	L	GF	GA	GD
38	20	11	7	63	40	+23	71	12	7	0	35	14	+21	8	4	7	28	26	+2

Last updated: 23 May 2015.
Source: kicker.de

==== Result round by round ====
Round	1	2	3	4	5	6	7	8	9	10	11	12	13	14	15	16	17	18	19	20	21	22	23	24	25	26	27	28	29	30	31	32	33	34	35	36	37	38
Ground	A	H	A	H	A	H	A	H	H	A	H	A	H	A	H	A	H	A	H	H	A	H	A	H	A	H	A	A	H	A	H	A	H	A	H	A	H	A
Result	L	D	W	D	D	D	W	W	W	D	W	W	D	L	D	L	W	L	W	W	D	D	W	W	L	W	D	L	W	W	D	W	W	W	W	W	W	L
Position	18	18	13	10	11	14	9	4	3	4	5	2	5	7	6	8	5	10	4	3	4	6	4	3	5	3	3	6	4	3	4	3	3	3	2	2	2	2

Updated to match(es) played on 23 May 2015. Source: kicker.de
A = Away; H = Home; W = Win; D = Draw; L = Loss

==== Matches ====
26 July 2014 1	SSV Jahn Regensburg	3–1	MSV Duisburg	Regensburg
14:00	Trettenbach 4'; Schmid 13'; Aosman 79'	Report	Janjić 40' (pen.)	Stadium: Jahnstadion; Attendance: 4,423; Referee: Martin Petersen (Stuttgart)

2 August 2014 2	MSV Duisburg	1–1	SG Sonnenhof Großaspach	Duisburg
14:00	Grote 2'	Report	Senesie 11'	Stadium: MSV-Arena; Attendance: 11,404; Referee: Florian Badstübner (Windsbach)

6 August 2014 3	FSV Mainz 05 II	3–4	MSV Duisburg	Mainz
19:00	Höler 67', 85'; Klement 83'	Report	Klotz 3'; Janjić 5'; Wille 61'; Grote 68'	Stadium: Stadion am Bruchweg; Attendance: 2,230; Referee: Lasse Koslowski (Berlin)

9 August 2014 4	MSV Duisburg	1–1	Hallescher FC	Duisburg
14:00	Janjić 49'	Report	Furuholm 64'	Stadium: MSV-Arena; Attendance: 11,095; Referee: Marcel Göpferich (Bad Schönborn)

24 August 2014 5	Chemnitzer FC	0–0	MSV Duisburg	Chemnitz
14:00		Report		Stadium: Stadion an der Gellertstraße; Attendance: 6,124; Referee: Florian Heft (Wietmarschen)

27 August 2014 6	MSV Duisburg	1–1	Arminia Bielefeld	Duisburg
19:00	Onuegbu 24'	Report	Börner 38'	Stadium: MSV-Arena; Attendance: 13,416; Referee: Arne Aarnink (Nordhorn)

30 August 2014 7	SC Fortuna Köln	0–1	MSV Duisburg	Cologne
14:00		Report	Janjić 52' (pen.)	Stadium: Südstadion; Attendance: 4,078; Referee: Patrick Schult (Hamburg)

6 September 2014 8	MSV Duisburg	3–0	VfL Osnabrück	Duisburg
14:00	Scheidhauer 44'; Dum 66'; Klotz 84'	Report		Stadium: MSV-Arena; Attendance: 11,764; Referee: Robert Kampka (Mainz)

13 September 2014 9	MSV Duisburg	2–0	Stuttgarter Kickers	Duisburg
14:00	Gardawski 16'; Grote 48'	Report		Stadium: MSV-Arena; Attendance: 11,336; Referee: Günter Perl (Pullach)

19 September 2014 10	SpVgg Unterhaching	1–1	MSV Duisburg	Unterhaching
19:00	Köpke 71'	Report	Janjić 90'	Stadium: Generali Sportpark; Attendance: 2,200; Referee: Thorben Siewer (Drolshagen)

24 September 2014 11	MSV Duisburg	2–1	Borussia Dortmund II	Duisburg
19:00	Janjić 62'; Scheidhauer 66'	Report	Amini 73'	Stadium: MSV-Arena; Attendance: 11,080; Referee: Steffen Mix (Abtswind)

27 September 2014 12	Hansa Rostock	1–3	MSV Duisburg	Rostock
14:00	Weidlich 15'	Report	Wolze 54'; Klotz 69', 90+1'	Stadium: DKB-Arena; Attendance: 6,700; Referee: Markus Wingenbach (Mainz)

4 October 2014 13	MSV Duisburg	1–1	VfB Stuttgart II	Duisburg
14:00	Bohl 34'	Report	Kiesewetter 64'	Stadium: MSV-Arena; Attendance: 13,441; Referee: Johannes Huber (Straubing)

18 October 2014 14	FC Energie Cottbus	2–0	MSV Duisburg	Cottbus
14:00	Mattuschka 59' (pen.); Kleindienst 86'	Report		Stadium: Stadion der Freundschaft; Attendance: 7,886; Referee: Benjamin Cortus (Röthenbach an der Pegnitz)

25 October 2014 15	MSV Duisburg	0–0	Dynamo Dresden	Duisburg
14:00		Report		Stadium: MSV-Arena; Attendance: 13,720; Referee: Markus Schmidt (Stuttgart)

2 November 2014 16	SC Preußen Münster	1–0	MSV Duisburg	Münster
14:00	Bischoff 30' (pen.)	Report		Stadium: Preußenstadion; Attendance: 12,011; Referee: Robert Kampka (Mainz)

8 November 2014 17	MSV Duisburg	2–0	Rot-Weiß Erfurt	Duisburg
14:00	Janjić 77'; Gardawski 88'	Report		Stadium: MSV-Arena; Attendance: 10,149; Referee: Tobias Reichel (Stuttgart)

22 November 2014 18	Holstein Kiel	1–0	MSV Duisburg	Kiel
14:00	Breitkreuz 89'	Report		Stadium: Holsteinstadion; Attendance: 5,802; Referee: Felix-Benjamin Schwermer (Magdeburg)

29 November 2014 19	MSV Duisburg	3–2	SV Wehen Wiesbaden	Duisburg
14:00	Scheidhauer 18'; Onuegbu 76'; Janjić 89'	Report	Funk 34'; Vunguidica 80'	Stadium: MSV-Arena; Attendance: 10,203; Referee: Patrick Ittrich (Hamburg)

6 December 2014 20	MSV Duisburg	2–0	SSV Jahn Regensburg	Duisburg
14:00	Gardawski 12'; Onuegbu 47'	Report		Stadium: MSV-Arena; Attendance: 10,081; Referee: Matthias Jöllenbeck (Freiburg)

13 December 2014 21	SG Sonnenhof Großaspach	1–1	MSV Duisburg	Aspach
14:00	Rizzi 17' (pen.)	Report	Janjić 26'	Stadium: Mechatronik Arena; Attendance: 2,378; Referee: Johannes Huber (Munich)

20 December 2014 22	MSV Duisburg	1–1	FSV Mainz 05 II	Duisburg
14:00	Janjić 12' (pen.)	Report	Roßbach 23'	Stadium: MSV-Arena; Attendance: 11,637; Referee: Lasse Koslowski (Berlin)

31 January 2015 23	Hallescher FC	1–2	MSV Duisburg	Halle
14:00	Furuholm 90+3'	Report	Janjić 7' (pen.); Onuegbu 90+2'	Stadium: Erdgas Sportpark; Attendance: 6,286; Referee: Benjamin Brand (Bamberg)

7 February 2015 24	MSV Duisburg	3–0	Chemnitzer FC	Duisburg
14:00	Grote 30', 32'; Onuegbu 36'	Report		Stadium: MSV-Arena; Attendance: 11,260; Referee: Stefan Treiber (Königsbrunn)

15 February 2015 25	Arminia Bielefeld	4–2	MSV Duisburg	Bielefeld
14:00	Ulm 43' (pen.); Klos 49', 76', 79'	Report	Janjić 27', 39'	Stadium: Bielefelder Alm; Attendance: 18,430; Referee: Robert Hartmann (Wangen)

21 February 2015 26	MSV Duisburg	2–0	SC Fortuna Köln	Duisburg
14:00	Onuegbu 17', 84'	Report		Stadium: MSV-Arena; Attendance: 12,041; Referee: Patrick Ittrich (Hamburg)

28 February 2015 27	VfL Osnabrück	1–1	MSV Duisburg	Osnabrück
14:00	Alvarez 38'	Report	Onuegbu 61'	Stadium: Osnatel-Arena; Attendance: 8,300; Referee: Manuel Gräfe (Berlin)

7 March 2015 28	Stuttgarter Kickers	4–2	MSV Duisburg	Stuttgart
14:00	Badiane 18'; Braun 27'; Calamita 54'; Stein 57'	Report	Dausch 60', 77'	Stadium: Gazi-Stadion auf der Waldau; Attendance: 8,600; Referee: Günter Perl (Pullach)

14 March 2015 29	MSV Duisburg	1–0	SpVgg Unterhaching	Duisburg
14:00	Janjić 57' (pen.)	Report		Stadium: MSV-Arena; Attendance: 11,322; Referee: Patrick Alt (Heusweiler)

21 March 2015 30	Borussia Dortmund II	1–4	MSV Duisburg	Dortmund
14:00	Harder 9'	Report	Dausch 23', 79'; Albutat 37'; Onuegbu 85'	Stadium: Stadion Rote Erde; Attendance: 4,500; Referee: Patrick Schult (Hamburg)

5 April 2015 31	MSV Duisburg	2–2	Hansa Rostock	Duisburg
14:00	Dausch 43'; Onuegbu 50'	Report	Sburlea 45'; Savran 55'	Stadium: MSV-Arena; Attendance: 15,630; Referee: Markus Wingenbach (Mainz)

12 April 2015 32	VfB Stuttgart II	1–2	MSV Duisburg	Stuttgart
14:00	Rausch 84' (pen.)	Report	Janjić 16' (pen.); Klotz 29'	Stadium: Gazi-Stadion auf der Waldau; Attendance: 810; Referee: Benedikt Kempkes (Koblenz)

18 April 2015 33	MSV Duisburg	3–2	Energie Cottbus	Duisburg
14:00	Onuegbu 8'; Wolze 48'; Bajić 59'	Report	Mattuschka 31' (pen.); Möhrle 90+2'	Stadium: MSV-Arena; Attendance: 12,556; Referee: Arne Aarnink (Nordhorn)

26 April 2015 34	Dynamo Dresden	0–2	MSV Duisburg	Dresden
14:00		Report	Onuegbu 67'; Janjić 77' (pen.)	Stadium: Glücksgas Stadium; Referee: Markus Schmidt (Stuttgart)

3 May 2015 35	MSV Duisburg	2–1	Preußen Münster	Duisburg
14:00	Grote 38'; Onuegbu 87'	Report	Heitmeier 90+4'	Stadium: MSV-Arena; Attendance: 22,763; Referee: Daniel Siebert (Berlin)

10 May 2015 36	Rot-Weiß Erfurt	0–2	MSV Duisburg	Erfurt
14:00		Report	Onuegbu 11'; Janjić 72'	Stadium: Steigerwaldstadion; Attendance: 4,864; Referee: Frank Willenborg (Osnabrück)

16 May 2015 37	MSV Duisburg	3–1	Holstein Kiel	Duisburg
13:30	Hajri 20'; Gardawski 21', 27'	Report	Kegel 10'	Stadium: MSV-Arena; Attendance: 31,002; Referee: Tobias Stieler (Hamburg)

23 May 2015 38	SV Wehen Wiesbaden	1–0	MSV Duisburg	Wiesbaden
13:30	Schorch 13' (o.g.)	Report		Stadium: BRITA-Arena; Attendance: 9,000; Referee: Lasse Koslowski (Berlin)

=== DFB-Pokal ===
15 August 2014 Round 1	MSV Duisburg	1–0	1. FC Nürnberg	Duisburg
20:00	Janjić 11' (pen.)	Report		Stadium: MSV-Arena; Attendance: 18,108; Referee: Christian Dingert (Lebecksmühle)

28 October 2014 Round 2	MSV Duisburg	0–0 (a.e.t.) (1–4 p)	1. FC Köln	Duisburg
20:30		Report		Stadium: MSV-Arena; Attendance: 30,600; Referee: Peter Sippel (Munich)
	Penalties
	Grote (penalty missed); Janjić (penalty missed); Feltscher (penalty scored)		(penalty scored) Lehmann; (penalty scored) Vogt; (penalty scored) Wimmer; (penalty scored) Matuszczyk

=== Niederrheinpokal ===
17 August 2014 Round 1	Duisburger FV 08	0–9	MSV Duisburg	Duisburg
17:00		Report	Lekesiz 6', 65'; Aycicek 22', 37', 38'; Dum 33', 61'; Schnellhardt 44'; M'Bengue 73'	Stadium: Fugmann-Kampfbahn; Attendance: 2,000; Referee: Markus Wollenweber (Mönchengladbach)

9 September 2014 Round 2	VSF Amern	1–3	MSV Duisburg	Duisburg
19:30	Bruse 76'		Lekesiz 34', 43'; Onuegbu 90+4'	Stadium: PCC-Stadion; Attendance: 1,115; Referee: Sven Heinrichs (Mönchengladbach)

11 October 2014 Round 3	SV Hönnepel-Niedermörmter	1–6	MSV Duisburg	Duisburg
13:30	Losing 32'	Report	Grote 4'; Meißner 29'; Gardawski 45'; Albutat 51'; Onuegbu 82', 87'	Stadium: MSV-Arena; Attendance: 8,600; Referee: Sven Waschitzki (Essen)

15 November 2014 Quarterfinal	TV Jahn Hiesfeld	0–7	MSV Duisburg	Dinslaken
13:30		Report	Schnellhardt 13', 36'; Janjić 44'; Bajić 52'; Gardawski 75'; Scheidhauer 78', 83'	Stadium: Stadion am Freibad; Attendance: 2,779; Referee: Marcel Pelgrim (Hamminkeln)

15 April 2015 Semifinal	Rot-Weiß Oberhausen	2–0	MSV Duisburg	Oberhausen
19:30	Scheelen 9'; Fleßers 42'	Report		Stadium: Niederrheinstadion; Attendance: 13,320; Referee: Martin Thomsen (Kleve)

=== Friendlies ===
28 June 2014	VfB Homberg (Germany)	0–1	(Germany) MSV Duisburg	Duisburg
15:30		Report	Schorch 90+1'	Stadium: PCC-Stadion

29 June 2014	KFC Uerdingen (Germany)	1–1	(Germany) MSV Duisburg	Krefeld
15:30	Ellguth 40'	Report	Schnellhardt 24'	Stadium: Grotenburg-Stadion; Attendance: 1,126

3 July 2014	Schwarz-Weiß Essen (Germany)	0–7	(Germany) MSV Duisburg	Essen
18:30		Report	De Wit 6'; Onuegbu 15'; Janjić 24', 31'; Tripado 48', 51'; Gardawski 58'	Stadium: Uhlenkrugstadion

5 July 2014	Viktoria Köln (Germany)	1–3	(Germany) MSV Duisburg	Duisburg
15:00	Spinrath 16'	Report	Janjić 26', 52'; Klotz 37'	Stadium: PCC-Stadion; Attendance: 500; Referee: Sven Waschitzki (Essen)

11 July 2014	FC Liefering (Austria)	7–3	(Germany) MSV Duisburg	Traunstein
18:00	? 8'; Gugganig 26'; Dovedan 30'; Ripic 49', 67', 90'; Caleta–Car 69'	Report	Klotz 6'; Grote 51'; Janjić 71' (pen.)	Stadium: ESV-Stadion

14 July 2014	1. FC Heidenheim (Germany)	2–0	(Germany) MSV Duisburg	Schwaz
17:30	Schnatterer 5' (pen.); Niederlechner 51'	Report		Stadium: Sportzentrum Schwaz

21 July 2014	MSV Duisburg (Germany)	1–1	(Germany) Bayern Munich	Duisburg
18:30	Schnellhardt 69'	Report	Lewandowski 62'	Stadium: MSV-Arena; Attendance: 24,126; Referee: Martin Thomsen (Kleve)

7 January 2015	MSV Duisburg (Germany)	6–0	(Germany) MSV Duisburg II	Duisburg
14:30	Onuegbu 11', 19', 38', 45'; Wolze 68'; Aycicek 77'	Report

11 January 2015	MSV Duisburg (Germany)	1–0	(Belgium) R. White Star Bruxelles	Antalya
	Bajić 22'	Report

14 January 2015	MSV Duisburg (Germany)	3–2	(Germany) SG Sonnenhof Großaspach	Antalya
17:00	Onuegbu 42'; Scheidhauer 50'; Bohl 84'	Report	Landeka 66'; Kuqi 88'

15 January 2015	Simurq PIK (Azerbaijan)	1–4	(Germany) MSV Duisburg	Antalya
15:30	Zargarov 23'	Report	Gardawski 29'; De Wit 62' (pen.); Klotz 64'; Dapkus 86'

19 January 2015	MSV Duisburg (Germany)	3–1	(Germany) SV Werder Bremen	Duisburg
18:30	Onuegbu 4'; Bohl 17'; Janjić 31'	Report	Ayçiçek 19'	Stadium: MSV-Arena; Attendance: 4,022; Referee: Martin Thomsen (Kleve)

24 January 2015	SSVg Velbert (Germany)	Postponed	(Germany) MSV Duisburg	Velbert
14:30		Report

27 March 2015	MSV Duisburg (Germany)	0–4	(Germany) 1. FC Kaiserslautern	Duisburg
18:45		Report	Jacob 25'; Stöger 61' (pen.); Klich 77' (pen.); Zoller 82'	Stadium: MSV-Arena; Attendance: 3,214; Referee: Sören Storks (Velen)

== Squad statistics ==
=== Statistics ===
Updated as of 23 May 2015.

No.	Pos	Nat	Player	Total		3. Liga		DFB-Pokal		Niederrheinpokal	
No.	Pos	Nat	Player	Apps	Goals	Apps	Goals	Apps	Goals	Apps	Goals
1	GK	(Germany) GER	Michael Ratajczak	40	0	36	0	2	0	2	0
2	DF	(Germany) GER	Matthias Kühne	18	0	14	0	0	0	4	0
3	DF	(Germany) GER	Enis Hajri	30	1	27	1	1	0	2	0
4	DF	(Germany) GER	Christopher Schorch	26	0	23	0	1	0	2	0
5	DF	(Bosnia and Herzegovina) BIH	Branimir Bajić	25	2	22	1	1	0	2	1
6	MF	(Germany) GER	Martin Dausch	16	5	16	5	0	0	0	0
7	MF	(Germany) GER	Sascha Dum	21	3	16	1	1	0	4	2
8	MF	(Germany) GER	Deniz Aycicek	3	3	0	0	0	0	3	3
9	MF	(Germany) GER	Pierre de Wit	14	0	13	0	0	0	1	0
10	FW	(Nigeria) NGA	Kingsley Onuegbu	40	17	34	14	2	0	4	3
11	MF	(Germany) GER	Michael Gardawski	31	7	26	5	2	0	3	2
13	MF	(Germany) GER	Zlatko Janjić	42	19	37	17	2	1	3	1
14	MF	(Germany) GER	Tim Albutat	37	2	33	1	2	0	2	1
15	MF	(Germany) GER	Erik Wille	4	1	3	1	1	0	0	0
16	FW	(Germany) GER	Gökhan Lekesiz	5	4	3	0	0	0	2	4
17	MF	(Germany) GER	Kevin Wolze	32	2	30	2	1	0	1	0
18	DF	(Germany) GER	Barkin Cömert	2	0	0	0	0	0	2	0
19	MF	(Germany) GER	Nico Klotz	38	5	31	5	2	0	5	0
20	MF	(Germany) GER	Dennis Grote	39	7	35	6	2	0	2	1
21	MF	(Venezuela) VEN	Rolf Feltscher	28	0	26	0	1	0	1	0
23	MF	(Germany) GER	Fabian Schnellhardt	20	3	13	0	2	0	5	3
25	DF	(Germany) GER	Thomas Meißner	37	1	33	0	2	0	2	1
27	DF	(Germany) GER	Babacar M'Bengue	3	1	0	0	0	0	3	1
28	DF	(Germany) GER	Steffen Bohl	34	1	31	1	2	0	1	0
30	GK	(Germany) GER	Marcel Lenz	5	0	2	0	0	0	3	0
31	MF	(Germany) GER	Marcel Stenzel	2	0	2	0	0	0	0	0
33	FW	(Germany) GER	Kevin Scheidhauer	28	5	24	3	1	0	3	2
	DF	(Germany) GER	Burak Akarca	1	0	0	0	0	0	1	0
	DF	(Germany) GER	Steffen Böhm	1	0	0	0	0	0	1	0
	DF	(Germany) GER	Niklas Heidemann	1	0	0	0	0	0	1	0
	FW	(Germany) GER	Georg Michajlov	1	0	0	0	0	0	1	0
	FW	(Turkey) TUR	Ismail Öztürk	1	0	0	0	0	0	1	0

=== Discipline ===
N	Pos.	Nat.	Name	Yellow card	Second yellow card	Red card	Notes
3	DF	(Germany)	Enis Hajri	11	0	0	
17	MF	(Germany)	Kevin Wolze	9	1	0	
5	DF	(Bosnia and Herzegovina)	Branimir Bajić	9	0	0	
14	MF	(Germany)	Tim Albutat	9	0	0	
25	DF	(Germany)	Thomas Meißner	8	0	0	
4	DF	(Germany)	Christopher Schorch	6	0	1	
33	FW	(Germany)	Kevin Scheidhauer	6	1	0	
7	MF	(Germany)	Sascha Dum	6	0	0	
20	MF	(Germany)	Dennis Grote	5	0	0	
2	DF	(Germany)	Matthias Kühne	4	0	0	
11	MF	(Germany)	Michael Gardawski	4	0	0	
21	MF	(Venezuela)	Rolf Feltscher	3	0	0	
6	MF	(Germany)	Martin Dausch	2	0	0	
13	MF	(Germany)	Zlatko Janjić	2	0	0	
1	GK	(Germany)	Michael Ratajczak	0	0	1	
9	MF	(Germany)	Pierre de Wit	1	0	0	
10	FW	(Nigeria)	Kingsley Onuegbu	1	0	0	
19	MF	(Germany)	Nico Klotz	1	0	0	
23	MF	(Germany)	Fabian Schnellhardt	1	0	0	
27	DF	(Germany)	Babacar M'Bengue	1	0	0	
28	DF	(Germany)	Steffen Bohl	1	0	0	

Last updated: 23 May 2015
Source: kicker.de
Only competitive matches
(yellow card) = Number of bookings; (second yellow card) = Number of sending offs after a second yellow card; (red card) = Number of sending offs by a direct red card.
