= 2015–16 MSV Duisburg season =

MSV Duisburg
2015–16 season
- Manager: Gino Lettieri
- 2. Bundesliga: 16th place (relegated)
- DFB-Pokal: First round
- Top goalscorer: League: Giorgi Chanturia; Kingsley Onuegbu (4); All: Giorgi Chanturia; Kingsley Onuegbu (4)
- Highest home attendance: 30,600 (vs Schalke, 8 August 2015)
- Lowest home attendance: 12,509 (vs Braunschweig, 23 September 2015)
- Average home league attendance: 19,240
| Home colours | Away colours | Third colours |

The 2015–16 MSV Duisburg season was the 116th season in the club's football history. In 2015–16 the club played in the 2. Bundesliga, the second tier of German football after being promoted.

The preseason started on 15 June 2015.

== Players ==
=== Team ===
Note: Flags indicate national team as defined under FIFA eligibility rules; some limited exceptions apply. Players may hold more than one non-FIFA nationality.

| No. | Pos. | Nation | Player |
|---|---|---|---|
| 1 | GK | GER | Michael Ratajczak |
| 2 | DF | GER | Matthias Kühne |
| 3 | MF | TUN | Enis Hajri |
| 4 | DF | GER | Dustin Bomheuer |
| 5 | DF | BIH | Branimir Bajić (captain) |
| 6 | MF | GER | Martin Dausch |
| 7 | FW | POR | Tomané |
| 8 | FW | GER | Thomas Bröker |
| 9 | MF | GER | Pierre de Wit |
| 10 | FW | NGA | Kingsley Onuegbu (Vice captain) |
| 11 | FW | RUS | Stanislav Iljutcenko |
| 13 | MF | BIH | Zlatko Janjić |
| 14 | MF | GER | Tim Albutat (on loan from SC Freiburg) |
| 15 | FW | NGA | Victor Obinna |
| 16 | MF | GER | Andreas Wiegel |
| 17 | DF | GER | Kevin Wolze |
| 18 | FW | GER | Simon Brandstetter |

| No. | Pos. | Nation | Player |
|---|---|---|---|
| 19 | MF | GER | Nico Klotz |
| 20 | MF | GER | Dennis Grote |
| 21 | DF | VEN | Rolf Feltscher |
| 22 | GK | GER | Maurice Schumacher |
| 23 | MF | AUS | James Holland |
| 24 | MF | GER | Dominik Behr |
| 25 | DF | GER | Thomas Meißner |
| 26 | MF | GER | Ahmet Engin |
| 27 | DF | GER | Dan-Patrick Poggenberg |
| 28 | DF | GER | Steffen Bohl (Vice captain) |
| 30 | GK | GER | Marcel Lenz |
| 33 | FW | GER | Kevin Scheidhauer |
| 34 | DF | TUR | Nurettin Kayaoğlu |
| 36 | MF | GEO | Giorgi Chanturia |
| 38 | MF | GER | Barış Özbek |
| 39 | GK | SEN | Timothy Dieng |

=== Transfers ===
==== In ====
| No. | Pos. | Nat. | Name | Age | EU | Moving from | Type | Transfer window | Ends | Transfer fee | Source |
|---|---|---|---|---|---|---|---|---|---|---|---|
| 4 | DF | (Germany) | Dustin Bomheuer | 24 | EU | Fortuna Düsseldorf (Germany) | Signing | Summer | 2017 | Free | |
| 7 | DF | (Georgia (country)) | Lasha Dvali | 20 | EU | Reading (England) | Signing | Summer | 2016 | Free | |
| 8 | FW | (Germany) | Thomas Bröker | 30 | EU | 1. FC Köln (Germany) | Signing | Summer | 2017 | Free | |
| 11 | FW | (Russia) | Stanislav Iljutcenko | 24 | EU | VfL Osnabrück (Germany) | Signing | Summer | 2017 | Free | |
| 15 | FW | (Nigeria) | Victor Obinna | 28 | Non-EU | Lokomotiv Moscow (Russia) | Signing | Summer | 2017 | Free | |
| 16 | MF | (Germany) | Andreas Wiegel | 23 | EU | Rot-Weiß Erfurt (Germany) | Signing | Summer | 2017 | Free | |
| 18 | FW | (Germany) | Simon Brandstetter | 25 | EU | Rot-Weiß Erfurt (Germany) | Signing | Summer | 2017 | Free | |
| 23 | MF | (Australia) | James Holland | 26 | Non-EU | Austria Wien | Signing | Summer | 2016 | Free | |
| 24 | MF | (Germany) | Dominik Behr | 19 | EU | | Promoted | Summer | 2016 | | |
| 26 | MF | (Germany) | Ahmet Engin | 18 | EU | | Promoted | Summer | 2017 | | |
| 27 | DF | (Germany) | Dan-Patrick Poggenberg | 23 | EU | VfL Wolfsburg (Germany) | Signing | Summer | 2017 | Free | |
| 34 | DF | (Turkey) | Nurettin Kayaoğlu | 23 | EU | Boluspor (Turkey) | Signing | Summer | 2017 | Free | |
| 36 | MF | (Georgia (country)) | Giorgi Chanturia | 22 | EU | CFR Cluj (Romania) | Signing | Summer | 2016 | Free | |
| 7 | FW | (Portugal) | Tomané | 23 | EU | Vitória de Guimarães (Portugal) | Signing | Winter | 2016 | Loan | |
| 38 | MF | (Germany) | Barış Özbek | 29 | EU | Kayserispor (Turkey) | Signing | Winter | 2016 | Free | |
| 39 | GK | (Senegal) | Timothy Dieng | 21 | EU | Grasshoppers (Switzerland) | Signing | Winter | 2016 | Free | |

==== Out ====
| No. | Pos. | Nat. | Name | Age | EU | Moving to | Type | Transfer window | Transfer fee | Source |
|---|---|---|---|---|---|---|---|---|---|---|
| 4 | DF | (Germany) | Christopher Schorch | 26 | EU | Energie Cottbus | End of contract | Summer | Free | |
| 7 | DF | (Germany) | Sascha Dum | 29 | EU | Schalke 04 II | Transfer | Summer | Free | |
| 11 | MF | (Germany) | Michael Gardawski | 24 | EU | Hansa Rostock | End of contract | Summer | Free | |
| 16 | FW | (Germany) | Gökhan Lekesiz | 24 | EU | Fortuna Sittard (Netherlands) | End of contract | Summer | Free | |
| 23 | MF | (Germany) | Fabian Schnellhardt | 21 | EU | Holstein Kiel | Loaned out | Summer | Loan | |
| 27 | DF | (Germany) | Babacar M'Bengue | 23 | EU | SC Wiedenbrück | End of contract | Summer | Free | |
| 7 | DF | (Georgia (country)) | Lasha Dvali | 20 | EU | Śląsk Wrocław (Poland) | Released | Winter | Free | |

== Preseason and friendlies ==
| 19 June 2015 1 | FC Eisenach (Germany) | 0–11 | (Germany) MSV Duisburg | Eisenach, Germany |
| 18:15 | | Report | Grote 11', 45'; Janjić 12'; Bohl 24'; Eckermann 41' (o.g.); Onuegbu 52', 65', 66'; Iljutcenko 73', 75', 76' | Stadium: Wartburg-Stadion; Attendance: 388 |

| 24 June 2015 2 | DSV 1900 (Germany) | 0–4 | (Germany) MSV Duisburg | Duisburg, Germany |
| 19:00 | | Report | Dausch 50'; Brandstetter 59', 63'; Onuegbu 78' | Attendance: 2,479 |

| 26 June 2015 3 | Blau-Weiß Neuenkamp (Germany) | 0–18 | (Germany) MSV Duisburg | Duisburg, Germany |
| 19:00 | | Report | Bohl 8', 9'; Janjić 16', 36', 45', 83'; Iljutcenko 18', 39', 44', 64'; Özden 50' (o.g.); Poggenberg 52'; Wiegel 54', 57'; Grote 60'; Kühne 66'; Dum 68'; Engin 84' | Attendance: 2,500 |

| 27 June 2015 4 | TV Voerde (Germany) | 0–14 | (Germany) MSV Duisburg | Voerde, Germany |
| 16:00 | | Report | Iljutcenko 14', 19', 30'; Wolze 40'; Engin 43'; Scheidhauer 48', 49', 69', 70'; Dausch 50'; Janjić 58'; 60' (o.g.); Bröker 64'; Wiegel 86' |

| 1 July 2015 5 | Skënderbeu Korçë (Albania) | 0–1 | (Germany) MSV Duisburg | Sankt Johann in Tirol, Austria |
| 18:30 | | Report | Dausch 4' |

| 5 July 2015 6 | Slavia Prague (Czech Republic) | 1–1 | (Germany) MSV Duisburg | Sankt Johann in Tirol, Austria |
| 15:30 | Bílek 54' | Report | Dum 90' |

| 6 July 2015 7 | SK St. Johann (Austria) | 1–19 | (Germany) MSV Duisburg | Sankt Johann in Tirol, Austria |
| 18:30 | Grander 30' | Report | Iljutcenko 12', 22', 39'; Engin 41'; Onuegbu 55', 57', 58', 62', 68', 78', 80'; Janjić 59', 81' (pen.); Dausch 60'; Bröker 74', 75', 84', 90'; Grote 90+1' |

| 11 July 2015 8 | MSV Duisburg (Germany) | 1–2 | (Germany) VfL Bochum | Duisburg, Germany |
| 18:30 | Janjić 70' (pen.) | Report | Haberer 22'; Gregoritsch 38' | Stadium: MSV-Arena; Referee: Guido Winkmann |

| 18 July 2015 9 | MSV Duisburg (Germany) | 0–2 | (Portugal) FC Porto | Duisburg, Germany |
| 18:00 | | Report | Brahimi 60'; Hernâni 64' | Stadium: MSV-Arena; Attendance: 7,020; Referee: Sascha Stegemann |

| 5 September 2015 10 | Standard Liège (Belgium) | 1–3 | (Germany) MSV Duisburg | Liège, Belgium |
| 15:00 | Scheidhauer 47' | Report | Emond 51'; Badibanga 59', 63' |

| 9 October 2015 11 | Borussia Mönchengladbach (Germany) | 0–0 | (Germany) MSV Duisburg | Mönchengladbach |
| 15:30 | | Report | | Attendance: 1,050; Referee: Martin Thomsen |

| 11 October 2015 12 | Viktoria Köln (Germany) | 4–4 | (Germany) MSV Duisburg | Cologne |
| 13:00 | Kreyer 6', 32'; Dias 21'; Steegmann 83' | Report | Obinna 48', 55'; Grote 60'; Chanturia 65' | Stadium: Sportpark Höhenberg |

| 9 January 2016 13 | 1. FC Köln (Germany) | 6–0 | (Germany) MSV Duisburg |
| | Zoller 12'; Modeste 16' (pen.), 32' (pen.); Osako 28'; Finne 50'; Hartel 83' | Report | | Referee: Thorben Siewer |

| 16 January 2016 13 | Holstein Kiel (Germany) | 1–0 | (Germany) MSV Duisburg | Belek |
| 15:00 | Fetsch 22' | Report |

| 19 January 2016 14 | Viktoria Plzeň (Czech Republic) | 0–1 | (Germany) MSV Duisburg | Belek |
| 17:30 | | Report | Wolze 14' |

| 30 January 2016 15 | VfL Bochum (Germany) | Postponed | (Germany) MSV Duisburg | Bochum |
| 14:00 | | Report | | Stadium: Ruhrstadion; Referee: Bastian Börner |
Note: Game was postponed after the first half because of rain. Duisburg was leading 1–0 at that time.

== Results ==
=== 2. Bundesliga ===
==== League table ====
| Pos | Team | Pld | W | D | L | GF | GA | GD | Pts | Promotion, qualification or relegation |
|---|---|---|---|---|---|---|---|---|---|---|
| 14 | Fortuna Düsseldorf | 34 | 9 | 8 | 17 | 32 | 47 | −15 | 35 | |
| 15 | 1860 Munich | 34 | 8 | 10 | 16 | 32 | 46 | −14 | 34 | |
| 16 | MSV Duisburg (R) | 34 | 7 | 11 | 16 | 32 | 54 | −22 | 32 | Qualification for relegation play-offs |
| 17 | FSV Frankfurt (R) | 34 | 8 | 8 | 18 | 33 | 59 | −26 | 32 | Relegation to 3. Liga |
| 18 | SC Paderborn (R) | 34 | 6 | 10 | 18 | 28 | 55 | −27 | 28 | Relegation to 3. Liga |

Source: DFB
Rules for classification: 1) Points; 2) Goal difference; 3) Goals scored
(R) Relegated

==== Results summary ====
| Overall | | | | | | | | Home | | | | | | Away | | | | | |
| Pld | W | D | L | GF | GA | GD | Pts | W | D | L | GF | GA | GD | W | D | L | GF | GA | GD |
|---|---|---|---|---|---|---|---|---|---|---|---|---|---|---|---|---|---|---|---|
| 34 | 7 | 11 | 16 | 32 | 54 | −22 | 32 | 6 | 5 | 6 | 17 | 22 | −5 | 1 | 6 | 10 | 15 | 32 | −17 |

Last updated: 15 May 2016.
Source: kicker.de

==== Result round by round ====
| Round | 1 | 2 | 3 | 4 | 5 | 6 | 7 | 8 | 9 | 10 | 11 | 12 | 13 | 14 | 15 | 16 | 17 | 18 | 19 | 20 | 21 | 22 | 23 | 24 | 25 | 26 | 27 | 28 | 29 | 30 | 31 | 32 | 33 | 34 |
|---|---|---|---|---|---|---|---|---|---|---|---|---|---|---|---|---|---|---|---|---|---|---|---|---|---|---|---|---|---|---|---|---|---|---|
| Ground | H | A | H | A | H | A | H | H | A | H | A | H | A | H | A | H | A | A | H | A | H | A | H | A | A | H | A | H | A | H | A | H | A | H |
| Result | L | L | D | L | D | L | L | L | L | W | L | D | L | D | D | W | L | L | D | L | L | D | L | D | D | W | D | L | W | W | L | W | D | W |
| Position | 17 | 18 | 18 | 18 | 17 | 18 | 18 | 18 | 18 | 18 | 18 | 18 | 18 | 18 | 18 | 18 | 18 | 18 | 18 | 18 | 18 | 18 | 18 | 18 | 18 | 18 | 18 | 18 | 18 | 18 | 18 | 17 | 16 | 16 |

Updated to match(es) played on 15 May 2016. Source: kicker.de
A = Away; H = Home; W = Win; D = Draw; L = Loss

==== Matches ====
| 24 July 2015 1 | MSV Duisburg | 1–3 | 1. FC Kaiserslautern | Duisburg |
| 20:30 | Bajić 81' | Report | Przybyłko 13', 29'; Wolze 18' (o.g.) | Stadium: MSV-Arena; Attendance: 23,686; Referee: Sascha Stegemann |

| 1 August 2015 2 | VfL Bochum | 3–0 | MSV Duisburg | Bochum |
| 13:00 | Perthel 56'; Bulut 68'; Terodde 84' | Report | | Stadium: Ruhrstadion; Attendance: 23,542; Referee: Florian Meyer |

| 16 August 2015 3 | MSV Duisburg | 2–2 | Arminia Bielefeld | Duisburg |
| 13:30 | Onuegbu 70'; Iljutcenko 74' | Report | Nöthe 6'; Dick 24' | Stadium: MSV-Arena; Attendance: 17,046; Referee: Felix Zwayer |

| 22 August 2015 4 | Karlsruher SC | 2–0 | MSV Duisburg | Karlsruhe |
| 13:00 | Hoffer 45'; Gulde 56' | Report | | Stadium: Wildparkstadion; Attendance: 15,000; Referee: Florian Heft |

| 29 August 2015 5 | MSV Duisburg | 2–2 | SpVgg Greuther Fürth | Duisburg |
| 13:00 | Feltscher 35'; Bohl 73' | Report | Gjasula 50' (pen.); Stiepermann 90+3' | Stadium: MSV-Arena; Attendance: 14,000; Referee: Arne Aarnink |

| 14 September 2015 6 | FC St. Pauli | 2–0 | MSV Duisburg | Hamburg |
| 20:15 | Sobiech 70' (pen.); Maier 87' | Report | | Stadium: Millerntor-Stadion; Attendance: 29,546; Referee: René Rohde |

| 20 September 2015 7 | MSV Duisburg | 0–1 | FSV Frankfurt | Duisburg |
| 13:30 | | Report | Konrad 32' | Stadium: MSV-Arena; Attendance: 15,124; Referee: Patrick Alt |

| 23 September 2015 8 | MSV Duisburg | 0–5 | Eintracht Braunschweig | Duisburg |
| 17:30 | | Report | Boland 12'; Berggreen 53', 68'; Reichel 74'; Khelifi 79' | Stadium: MSV-Arena; Attendance: 12,509; Referee: Martin Petersen |

| 26 September 2015 9 | Union Berlin | 3–2 | MSV Duisburg | Berlin |
| 13:00 | Wood 4'; Brandy 31'; Kreilach 45+1' | Report | Obinna 56'; Onuegbu 84' | Stadium: Stadion An der Alten Försterei; Attendance: 18,425; Referee: Sören Storks |

| 5 October 2015 10 | MSV Duisburg | 1–0 | SC Paderborn | Duisburg |
| 20:15 | Chanturia 81' | Report | | Stadium: MSV-Arena; Attendance: 14,667; Referee: Bastian Dankert |

| 18 October 2015 11 | 1. FC Heidenheim | 1–0 | MSV Duisburg | Heidenheim |
| 13:30 | Skarke 83' | Report | | Stadium: Voith-Arena; Attendance: 12,146; Referee: Thorben Siewer |

| 24 October 2015 12 | MSV Duisburg | 0–0 | 1. FC Nürnberg | Duisburg |
| 13:00 | | Report | | Stadium: MSV-Arena; Attendance: 16,418; Referee: Timo Gerach |

| 1 November 2015 13 | TSV 1860 München | 1–0 | MSV Duisburg | Munich |
| 13:30 | Wolf 90+1' | Report | | Stadium: Allianz Arena; Attendance: 17,100; Referee: Bibiana Steinhaus |

| 7 November 2015 14 | MSV Duisburg | 1–1 | SC Freiburg | Duisburg |
| 13:00 | Bröker 42' | Report | Abrashi 62' | Stadium: MSV-Arena; Attendance: 15,311; Referee: Thorsten Schriever |

| 20 November 2015 15 | Fortuna Düsseldorf | 1–1 | MSV Duisburg | Düsseldorf |
| 18:30 | Demirbay 75' | Report | Bohl 77' | Stadium: Esprit Arena; Attendance: 34,688; Referee: Patrick Ittrich |

| 29 November 2015 16 | MSV Duisburg | 3–0 | SV Sandhausen | Duisburg |
| 13:30 | Feltscher 61'; Albutat 67'; Janjić 90' | Report | | Stadium: MSV-Arena; Attendance: 13,454; Referee: Benjamin Brand |

| 6 December 2015 17 | RB Leipzig | 4–2 | MSV Duisburg | Leipzig |
| 13:30 | Poulsen 27', 90'; Quaschner 85'; Nukan 87' | Report | Wolze 18'; Scheidhauer 80' | Stadium: Red Bull Arena; Attendance: 27,477; Referee: Peter Sippel |

| 13 December 2015 18 | 1. FC Kaiserslautern | 2–0 | MSV Duisburg | Kaiserslautern |
| 13:30 | Deville 60'; Klich 90+4' | Report | | Stadium: Fritz-Walter-Stadion; Attendance: 22,277; Referee: Knut Kircher |

| 20 December 2015 19 | MSV Duisburg | 0–0 | VfL Bochum | Duisburg |
| 13:30 | | Report | | Stadium: MSV-Arena; Attendance: 22,351; Referee: Robert Hartmann |

| 8 February 2015 20 | Arminia Bielefeld | 2–1 | MSV Duisburg | Bielefeld |
| 20:15 | Klos 22'; Nöthe 26' | Report | Bröker 11' | Stadium: Bielefelder Alm; Attendance: 15,083; Referee: Robert Schröder |

| 13 February 2016 21 | MSV Duisburg | 0–1 | Karlsruher SC | Duisburg |
| 13:00 | | Report | Torres 1' | Stadium: MSV-Arena; Attendance: 14,183; Referee: Sören Storks |

| 19 February 2015 22 | SpVgg Greuther Fürth | 1–1 | MSV Duisburg | Fürth |
| 18:30 | Gjasula 67' (pen.) | Report | Wolze 47' | Stadium: Stadion am Laubenweg; Attendance: 8,920; Referee: Bibiana Steinhaus |

| 28 February 2016 23 | MSV Duisburg | 0–2 | FC St. Pauli | Duisburg |
| 13:30 | | Report | Rzatkowski 64'; Verhoek 90+4' | Stadium: MSV-Arena; Attendance: 20,790; Referee: Frank Willenborg |

| 2 March 2016 24 | FSV Frankfurt | 3–3 | MSV Duisburg | Frankfurt |
| 17:30 | Hajsafi 5'; Kalmár 48'; Rolim 54' | Report | Iljutcenko 59'; Onuegbu 76'; Meißner 90+2' | Stadium: Stadion am Bornheimer Hang; Attendance: 4,773; Referee: Thorsten Schriever |

| 6 March 2016 25 | Eintracht Braunschweig | 1–1 | MSV Duisburg | Braunschweig |
| 13:30 | Khelifi 60' | Report | Chanturia 59' | Stadium: Eintracht-Stadion; Attendance: 20,158; Referee: Thorben Siewer |

| 12 March 2016 26 | MSV Duisburg | 2–1 | Union Berlin | Duisburg |
| 13:00 | Iljutcenko 65'; Klotz 70' | Report | Wood 61' (pen.) | Stadium: MSV-Arena; Attendance: 12,702; Referee: Florian Heft |

| 18 March 2016 27 | SC Paderborn | 0–0 | MSV Duisburg | Paderborn |
| 18:30 | | Report | | Stadium: Benteler Arena; Attendance: 10,828; Referee: Harm Osmers |

| 1 April 2016 28 | MSV Duisburg | 0–2 | 1. FC Heidenheim | Duisburg |
| 18:30 | | Report | Griesbeck 24'; Finne 49' | Stadium: MSV-Arena; Attendance: 14,039; Referee: Patrick Alt |

| 10 April 2016 29 | 1. FC Nürnberg | 1–2 | MSV Duisburg | Nürnberg |
| 13:30 | Leibold 62' | Report | Wolze 35'; Bohl 60' | Stadium: Frankenstadion; Attendance: 40,169; Referee: Sören Storks |

| 15 April 2016 30 | MSV Duisburg | 2–1 | TSV 1860 München | Duisburg |
| 18:30 | Bröker 73'; Obinna 85' | Report | Liendl 64' | Stadium: MSV-Arena; Attendance: 22,482; Referee: Thorben Siewer |

| 22 April 2016 31 | SC Freiburg | 3–0 | MSV Duisburg | Freiburg |
| 18:30 | Grifo 23'; Philipp 32'; Petersen 79' (pen.) | Report | | Stadium: Schwarzwald-Stadion; Attendance: 23,500; Referee: Michael Weiner |

| 29 April 2016 32 | MSV Duisburg | 2–1 | Fortuna Düsseldorf | Duisburg |
| 18:30 | Onuegbu 46'; Obinna 58' | Report | Pohjanpalo 67' | Stadium: MSV-Arena; Attendance: 28,500; Referee: Benjamin Brand |

| 8 May 2016 33 | SV Sandhausen | 2–2 | MSV Duisburg | Sandhausen |
| 15:30 | Klingmann 68'; Vollmann 75' | Report | Klotz 80'; Chanturia 82' | Stadium: Hardtwaldstadion; Attendance: 8,023; Referee: Knut Kircher |

| 15 May 2016 34 | MSV Duisburg | 1–0 | RB Leipzig | Duisburg |
| 15:30 | Chanturia 75' | Report | | Stadium: MSV-Arena; Attendance: 28,209; Referee: Tobias Welz |

=== Relegation play-offs ===
| 20 May 2016 First leg | Würzburger Kickers | 2–0 | MSV Duisburg | Würzburg |
| 19:10 | Weil 10' (pen.); Nagy 79' | Report | | Stadium: flyeralarm Arena; Attendance: 9,806; Referee: Sascha Stegemann |

| 24 May 2016 Second leg | MSV Duisburg | 1–2 (1–4 agg.) | Würzburger Kickers | Duisburg |
| 19:10 | Schoppenhauer 33' (o.g.) | Report | Soriano 37'; Benatelli 90+2' | Stadium: MSV-Arena; Attendance: 29,500; Referee: Tobias Stieler |

=== DFB-Pokal ===
| 8 August 2015 Round 1 | MSV Duisburg | 0–5 | Schalke 04 | Duisburg |
| 15:30 | | Report | Huntelaar 3'; Nastasić 39'; Geis 45+2'; Di Santo 63'; Goretzka 85' | Stadium: MSV-Arena; Attendance: 30,600; Referee: Wolfgang Stark |

== Statistics ==
=== Squad statistics ===
| No. | Pos | Nat | Player | Total | | 2. Bundesliga | | DFB-Pokal | |
| No. | Pos | Nat | Player | Apps | Goals | Apps | Goals | Apps | Goals |
|---|---|---|---|---|---|---|---|---|---|
| 1 | GK | (Germany) GER | Michael Ratajczak | 34 | 0 | 33 | 0 | 1 | 0 |
| 3 | MF | (Germany) GER | Enis Hajri | 8 | 0 | 8 | 0 | 0 | 0 |
| 4 | DF | (Germany) GER | Dustin Bomheuer | 11 | 0 | 10 | 0 | 1 | 0 |
| 5 | DF | (Bosnia and Herzegovina) BIH | Branimir Bajić | 30 | 1 | 29 | 1 | 1 | 0 |
| 6 | MF | (Germany) GER | Martin Dausch | 13 | 0 | 13 | 0 | 0 | 0 |
| 7 | FW | (Portugal) POR | Tomané | 9 | 0 | 9 | 0 | 0 | 0 |
| 8 | FW | (Germany) GER | Thomas Bröker | 25 | 3 | 24 | 3 | 1 | 0 |
| 9 | MF | (Germany) GER | Pierre de Wit | 1 | 0 | 1 | 0 | 0 | 0 |
| 10 | FW | (Nigeria) NGA | Kingsley Onuegbu | 31 | 4 | 31 | 4 | 0 | 0 |
| 11 | FW | (Germany) GER | Stanislav Iljutcenko | 23 | 3 | 22 | 3 | 1 | 0 |
| 13 | MF | (Germany) GER | Zlatko Janjić | 18 | 1 | 17 | 1 | 1 | 0 |
| 14 | MF | (Germany) GER | Tim Albutat | 25 | 1 | 24 | 1 | 1 | 0 |
| 15 | FW | (Nigeria) NGA | Victor Obinna | 16 | 3 | 16 | 3 | 0 | 0 |
| 16 | MF | (Germany) GER | Andreas Wiegel | 1 | 0 | 1 | 0 | 0 | 0 |
| 17 | MF | (Germany) GER | Kevin Wolze | 36 | 3 | 35 | 3 | 1 | 0 |
| 18 | FW | (Germany) GER | Simon Brandstetter | 6 | 0 | 5 | 0 | 1 | 0 |
| 19 | MF | (Germany) GER | Nico Klotz | 18 | 2 | 18 | 2 | 0 | 0 |
| 20 | MF | (Germany) GER | Dennis Grote | 21 | 0 | 20 | 0 | 1 | 0 |
| 21 | DF | (Venezuela) VEN | Rolf Feltscher | 29 | 2 | 28 | 2 | 1 | 0 |
| 23 | DF | (Australia) AUS | James Holland | 32 | 0 | 31 | 0 | 1 | 0 |
| 25 | DF | (Germany) GER | Thomas Meißner | 29 | 1 | 28 | 1 | 1 | 0 |
| 26 | MF | (Germany) GER | Ahmet Engin | 1 | 0 | 1 | 0 | 0 | 0 |
| 27 | MF | (Germany) GER | Dan-Patrick Poggenberg | 12 | 0 | 12 | 0 | 0 | 0 |
| 28 | DF | (Germany) GER | Steffen Bohl | 31 | 3 | 30 | 3 | 1 | 0 |
| 30 | GK | (Germany) GER | Marcel Lenz | 3 | 0 | 3 | 0 | 0 | 0 |
| 33 | FW | (Germany) GER | Kevin Scheidhauer | 16 | 1 | 16 | 1 | 0 | 0 |
| 35 | DF | (Germany) GER | Gianluca Hossmann | 1 | 0 | 1 | 0 | 0 | 0 |
| 36 | MF | (Georgia (country)) GEO | Giorgi Chanturia | 24 | 4 | 24 | 4 | 0 | 0 |
| 38 | MF | (Germany) GER | Barış Özbek | 9 | 0 | 9 | 0 | 0 | 0 |
| | DF | (Georgia (country)) GEO | Lasha Dvali † | 1 | 0 | 1 | 0 | 0 | 0 |

^{†} Player left the club during the season

=== Goals ===
| Rank | Player | Position | 2. Bundesliga | DFB-Pokal | Total |
|---|---|---|---|---|---|
| 1 | (Georgia (country)) Giorgi Chanturia | MF | 4 | 0 | 4 |
| 1 | (Nigeria) Kingsley Onuegbu | FW | 4 | 0 | 4 |
| 3 | (Germany) Steffen Bohl | MF | 3 | 0 | 3 |
| 3 | (Germany) Thomas Bröker | MF | 3 | 0 | 3 |
| 3 | (Germany) Stanislav Iljutcenko | FW | 3 | 0 | 3 |
| 3 | (Nigeria) Victor Obinna | FW | 3 | 0 | 3 |
| 3 | (Germany) Kevin Wolze | DF | 3 | 0 | 3 |
| 8 | (Venezuela) Rolf Feltscher | DF | 2 | 0 | 2 |
| 8 | (Germany) Nico Klotz | MF | 1 | 0 | 2 |
| 10 | (Germany) Tim Albutat | MF | 1 | 0 | 1 |
| 10 | (Bosnia and Herzegovina) Branimir Bajić | DF | 1 | 0 | 1 |
| 10 | (Germany) Zlatko Janjić | FW | 1 | 0 | 1 |
| 10 | (Germany) Thomas Meißner | DF | 1 | 0 | 1 |
| 10 | (Germany) Kevin Scheidhauer | FW | 1 | 0 | 1 |
| Total | | | 33 | 0 | 33 |

=== Disciplinary record ===
| N | P | Nat. | Name | 2. Bundesliga | | | DFB-Pokal | | | Total | | | Notes |
| N | P | Nat. | Name | Yellow card | Second yellow card | Red card | Yellow card | Second yellow card | Red card | Yellow card | Second yellow card | Red card | Notes |
| 23 | MF | (Australia) | James Holland | 12 | | 1 | | | | 12 | | 1 | |
| 5 | DF | (Bosnia and Herzegovina) | Branimir Bajić | 10 | | | | 1 | | 10 | 1 | | |
| 17 | MF | (Germany) | Kevin Wolze | 7 | | | 1 | | | 8 | | | |
| 14 | MF | (Germany) | Tim Albutat | 7 | | 1 | | | | 7 | | 1 | |
| 20 | MF | (Germany) | Dennis Grote | 6 | | | 1 | | | 7 | | | |
| 25 | DF | (Germany) | Thomas Meißner | 6 | 1 | | | | | 6 | 1 | | |
| 21 | DF | (Venezuela) | Rolf Feltscher | 5 | 1 | | | | | 5 | 1 | | |
| 36 | MF | (Georgia (country)) | Giorgi Chanturia | 4 | | | | | | 4 | | | |
| 15 | FW | (Nigeria) | Victor Obinna | 3 | | 1 | | | | 3 | | 1 | |
| 28 | MF | (Germany) | Steffen Bohl | 3 | | | | | | 3 | | | |
| 27 | DF | (Germany) | Dan-Patrick Poggenberg | 3 | | | | | | 3 | | | |
| 3 | MF | (Germany) | Enis Hajri | 2 | | 1 | | | | 2 | | 1 | |
| 6 | MF | (Germany) | Martin Dausch | 2 | | | | | | 2 | | | |
| 7 | FW | (Portugal) | Tomané | 2 | | | | | | 2 | | | |
| 10 | FW | (Nigeria) | Kingsley Onuegbu | 2 | | | | | | 2 | | | |
| 33 | FW | (Germany) | Kevin Scheidhauer | 2 | | | | | | 2 | | | |
| 38 | MF | (Germany) | Barış Özbek | 2 | | | | | | 2 | | | |
| 1 | GK | (Germany) | Michael Ratajczak | 1 | | | | | | 1 | | | |
| 4 | DF | (Germany) | Dustin Bomheuer | 1 | | | | | | 1 | | | |
| 8 | MF | (Germany) | Thomas Bröker | 1 | | | | | | 1 | | | |
| 9 | MF | (Germany) | Pierre de Wit | 1 | | | | | | 1 | | | |
| 11 | FW | (Germany) | Stanislav Iljutcenko | 1 | | | | | | 1 | | | |
| 13 | FW | (Germany) | Zlatko Janjić | 1 | | | | | | 1 | | | |
| 18 | FW | (Germany) | Simon Brandstetter | 1 | | | | | | 1 | | | |
| 19 | MF | (Germany) | Nico Klotz | 1 | | | | | | 1 | | | |

Last updated: 25 May 2016
Source: Matches
Ordered by (red card) , (second yellow card) and (yellow card)
(yellow card) = Number of bookings; (second yellow card) = Number of sending offs after a second yellow card; (red card) = Number of sending offs by a direct red card.
