= Kevin Scheidhauer =

German former professional footballer (born 1992)

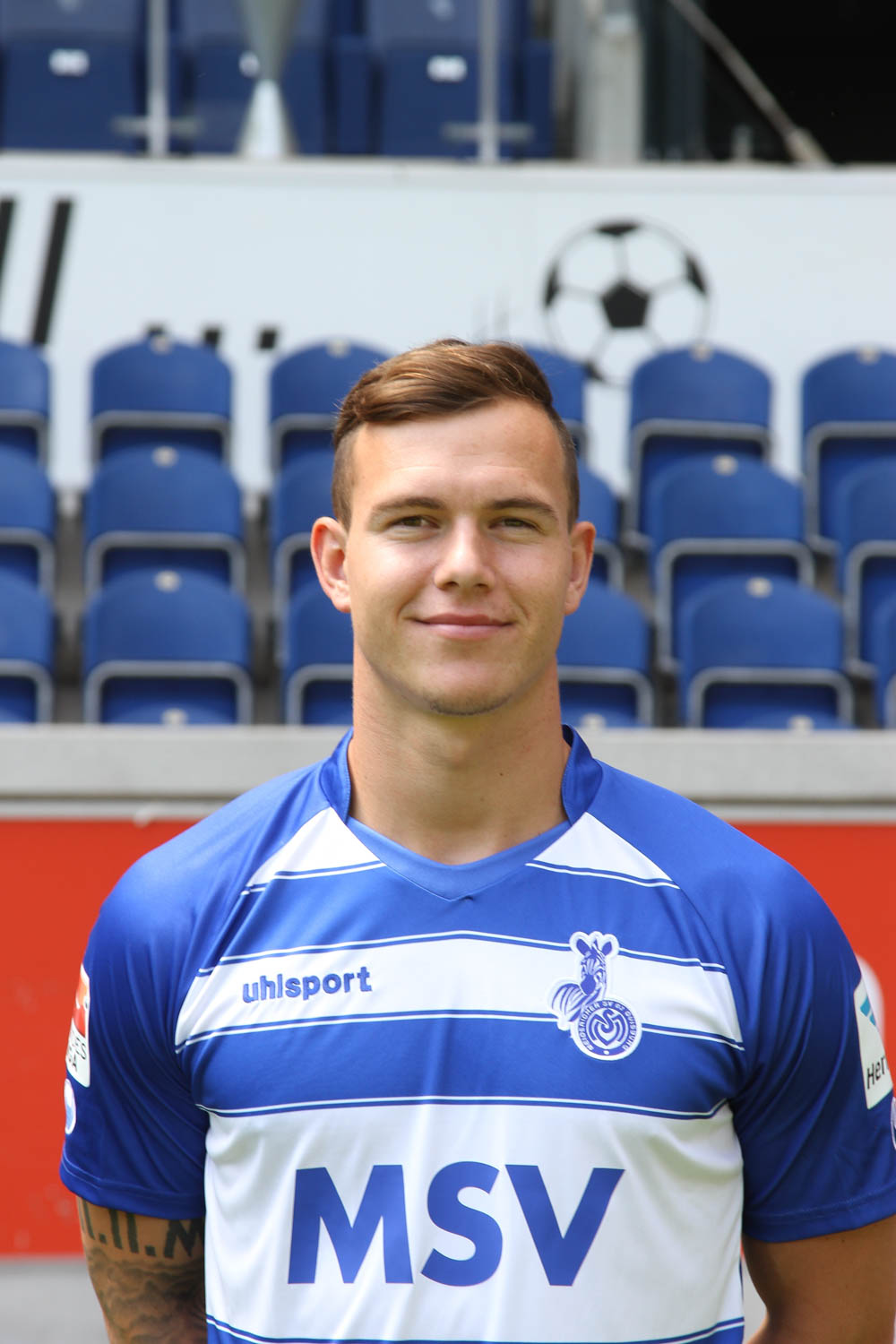
- Scheidhauer with MSV Duisburg in 2015

Personal information
- Date of birth: 13 February 1992 (age 34)
- Place of birth: Deggendorf, Germany
- Height: 1.90 m (6 ft 3 in)
- Position: Forward

Youth career
- 1999–2000: SV Bremer Leipzig
- 2000–2004: VfB Leipzig
- 2004–2008: Lokomotive Leipzig
- 2008–2011: VfL Wolfsburg

Senior career*
Years	Team	Apps	(Gls)
2010–2012	VfL Wolfsburg II	66	(27)
2011–2014	VfL Wolfsburg	0	(0)
2012–2013	→ VfL Bochum II (loan)	9	(4)
2012–2013	→ VfL Bochum (loan)	19	(3)
2014–2016	MSV Duisburg	39	(4)
2015–2016	MSV Duisburg II	5	(3)
2016–2017	Schalke 04 II	1	(0)
2018–2019	Energie Cottbus	29	(5)
Total		168	(46)

International career
2009	Germany U17	10	(3)
2009–2010	Germany U18	8	(3)
2010–2011	Germany U19	5	(0)
- * Club domestic league appearances and goals

Kevin Scheidhauer (born 13 February 1992) is a German former professional footballer who played as a forward both professionally and for the U17, U18 and U19 levels of youth football for Germany.

== Career ==
Scheidhauer joined MSV Duisburg for the 2014–15 season. For the 2016–17 season he moved to Schalke 04 II.

Following an injury to his ankle joint which kept him out of action for 1.5 years, Scheidhauer trained twice a week with German fifth-tier side Lupo Martini Wolfsburg. In November 2017, he went on trial with fourth-tier club Energie Cottbus. A month later, he signed a contract with the club which would run from the 2017–18 winter transfer period until 31 June 2019.

He announced his retirement from playing in October 2020.

== Career statistics ==
Appearances and goals by club, season and competition
Club	Season	League			Cup		Other^{1}		Total	
Club	Season	Division	Apps	Goals	Apps	Goals	Apps	Goals	Apps	Goals
VfL Wolfsburg II	2009–10	Regionalliga Nord	1	0	—		—		1	0
VfL Wolfsburg II	2010–11	Regionalliga Nord	11	1	—		—		11	1
VfL Wolfsburg II	2011–12	Regionalliga Nord	29	6	—		—		29	6
VfL Wolfsburg II	2013–14	Regionalliga Nord	25	20	—		2	0	27	20
VfL Wolfsburg II	Total		66	27	0	0	2	0	68	27
VfL Bochum (loan)	2012–13	2. Bundesliga	19	3	2	0	—		21	3
VfL Bochum II (loan)	2012–13	Regionalliga West	9	4	—		—		9	4
MSV Duisburg	2014–15	3. Liga	24	3	1	0	—		25	3
MSV Duisburg	2015–16	2. Bundesliga	15	1	0	0	1	0	16	1
MSV Duisburg	Total		39	4	1	0	1	0	41	4
MSV Duisburg II	2014–15	Oberliga Niederrhein	1	3	—		—		1	3
MSV Duisburg II	2015–16	Oberliga Niederrhein	4	0	—		—		4	0
MSV Duisburg II	Total		5	3	0	0	0	0	5	3
Schalke 04 II	2016–17	Regionalliga West	1	0	—		—		1	0
Energie Cottbus	2017–18	Regionalliga Nordost	15	4	—		2	0	17	4
Energie Cottbus	2018–19	3. Liga	14	1	1	0	–		15	1
Energie Cottbus	Total		29	5	1	0	2	0	32	5
Career total			168	46	4	0	5	0	177	46

- 1.Includes relegation playoff and Regionalliga promotion playoff.
