= Nurettin Kayaoğlu =

Turkish footballer

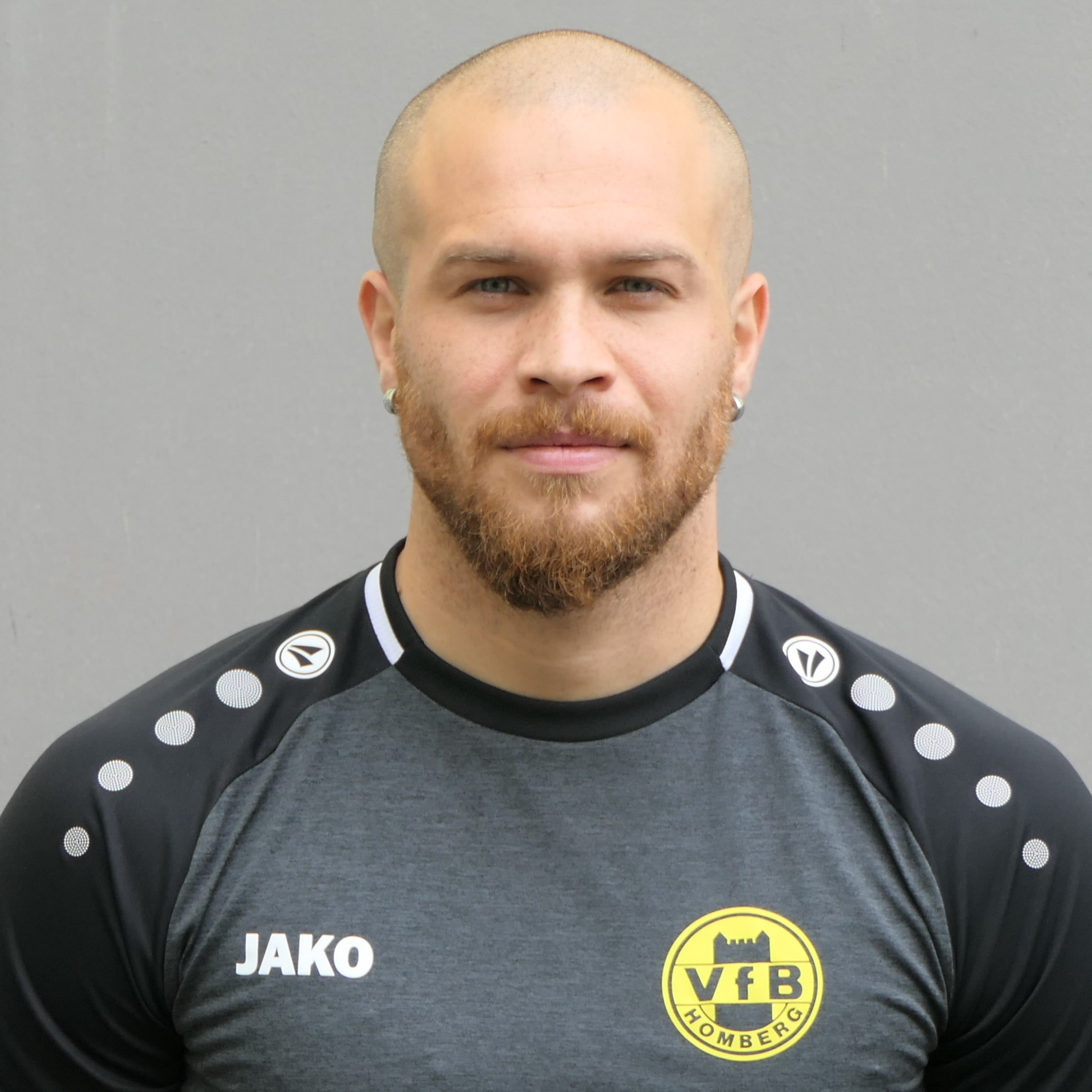

Personal information
- Date of birth: 8 January 1992 (age 34)
- Place of birth: Duisburg, Germany
- Height: 1.82 m (6 ft 0 in)
- Position: Left-back

Team information
- Current team: Mülheimer FC 97
- Number: 4

Youth career
- 1999–2000: Hamborn 07
- 2000–2003: MSV Duisburg
- 2003–2011: Schalke 04

Senior career*
Years	Team	Apps	(Gls)
2011–2012	Schalke 04 II	1	(0)
2012–2014	Kayserispor	4	(0)
2013–2014	→ Adana Demirspor (loan)	13	(0)
2014–2015	Boluspor	19	(0)
2015–2016	MSV Duisburg	0	(0)
2016–2017	Rot Weiss Ahlen	25	(0)
2017–2018	Nazilli Belediyespor	11	(0)
2018–2019	Bandırmaspor	28	(1)
2019	VfB Homberg	7	(1)
2020	TuS Haltern	5	(0)
2020–2021	VfB Homberg	19	(1)
2021–2022	FSV Duisburg	26	(5)
2022–	Mülheimer FC 97	63	(9)

International career
2008	Turkey U16	3	(0)
2008–2009	Turkey U17	18	(0)
2009–2010	Turkey U18	5	(0)
2011	Turkey U19	2	(0)
2012–2013	Turkey U21	6	(1)
- * Club domestic league appearances and goals as of 20:09, 4 February 2025 (UTC)

Nurettin Kayaoğlu (born 8 January 1992) is a football defender who plays for German Oberliga Niederrhein club Mülheimer FC 97. He made his Süper Lig debut on 19 August 2012. Born in Germany, he represented Turkey at youth international levels.

== Career ==
He joined MSV Duisburg for the 2015–2016 season.

On 13 January 2020, Kayaoğlu joined German club TuS Haltern.

== International career ==
Kayaoğlu represented Turkey at the 2009 UEFA European Under-17 Championship and 2009 FIFA U-17 World Cup.
