= Erik Wille =

German footballer

Personal information
- Date of birth: 28 March 1993 (age 33)
- Place of birth: Frankfurt, Germany
- Height: 1.83 m (6 ft 0 in)
- Position: Defender

Youth career
- FC Germania 1911 Enkheim
- Eintracht Frankfurt

Senior career*
Years	Team	Apps	(Gls)
2012–2014	Eintracht Frankfurt II	60	(6)
2014–2015	MSV Duisburg	3	(1)
Total		63	(7)
- * Club domestic league appearances and goals

Erik Wille (born 28 March 1993) is a German former professional footballer who played as a defender.

== Career ==
Wille joined MSV Duisburg for the 2014–15 season. In October 2015, Wille was forced to retire from professional football due to a hip injury.
