= Alexander Scheelen =

German footballer

Personal information
- Date of birth: 25 June 1987 (age 39)
- Place of birth: Duisburg, Germany
- Height: 1.83 m (6 ft 0 in)
- Position: Central midfielder

Team information
- Current team: Rot-Weiß Oberhausen
- Number: 26

Senior career*
Years	Team	Apps	(Gls)
2006–2007	Hamborn 07		
2007–2008	SV Sterkrade-Nord		
2008–2011	VfB Speldorf	66	(3)
2011–2013	Rot-Weiß Oberhausen II	31	(9)
2012–	Rot-Weiß Oberhausen	148	(11)
- * Club domestic league appearances and goals as of 1 March 2021

Alexander Scheelen (born 25 June 1987) is a German professional footballer who plays as a central midfielder for Rot-Weiß Oberhausen.
