= Gino Lettieri =

Italian football manager (born 1966)

Personal information
- Date of birth: 23 December 1966 (age 59)
- Place of birth: Zürich, Switzerland
- Height: 1.70 m (5 ft 7 in)
- Position: Midfielder

Senior career*
Years	Team	Apps	(Gls)
1986–1987	1860 Munich		
1987	TSV Ampfing		
1988–1990	Wacker München		
1990–1991	TSV Ampfing		
1991	Falke Markt Schwaben		

Managerial career
- 1997–2000: Bayern Hof
- 2000–2002: FC Augsburg
- 2002–2003: Bonner SC
- 2003–2006: SpVgg Bayreuth
- 2006: Darmstadt 98
- 2007: Wacker Burghausen
- 2007–2010: SpVgg Weiden
- 2010–2012: Wehen Wiesbaden
- 2014–2015: MSV Duisburg
- 2017: FSV Frankfurt
- 2017–2019: Korona Kielce
- 2020–2021: MSV Duisburg
- 2021–2022: AEK Athens (assistant)
- 2022–2024: FK Panevėžys
- 2024–2025: Muangthong United
- 2025: Uthai Thani
- 2025: Wieczysta Kraków
- 2026: Meizhou Hakka
- * Club domestic league appearances and goals

Gino Lettieri (born 23 December 1966) is a professional football manager. Born in Switzerland, he is an Italian national.

== Coaching career ==
=== 1994–2006: Early career ===
Lettieri was the assistant coach of 1860 Munich from July 1994 to April 1997. He then became manager of Bayern Hof from 23 April 1997 to 30 June 2000. In the 1996–97 season, under Lettieri, Bayern Hof got two wins, one draw, and three losses to finish 15th in the Bayernliga. They finished in 10th place in the 1997–98 season, 14th in the 1998–99 season, and in fourth place in the 1999–2000 season. Then on 1 July 2000, Lettieri became manager of FC Augsburg In the Bayernliga, Augsburg finished fourth in the 2000–01 season and first in the 2001–02 season. On 20 June 2002, Bonner SC announced Lettieri as their new manager. He started on 1 July 2002. He finished the 2002–03 season in 12th season. He was in Bonn until 11 September 2003 when he joined then Bayernliga side SpVgg Bayreuth. His last match as Bonn's manager was a 2–0 loss to GFC Düren on 7 September 2003. He was in sixth place when he left Bonn. While at Bayreuth, during the 2003–04 season, he finished with a record of 11 wins, eight draws, and six losses to finish seventh in the Oberliga Bayern table. Bayreuth won promotion to the Regionalliga Süd during the 2004–05 season. They finished 10th in the 2005–06 season.

=== 2006–10: Darmstadt, Wacker Burghausen, and Weiden ===
On 10 June 2006, Lettieri signed a two–year contract with Darmstadt 98. During his time at Darmstadt, he lost 1–0 in extra time in the German Cup. He was sacked on 6 October 2006. His final match was a 4–2 win against 1899 Hoffenheim on 29 September 2006. He finished with a record of three wins, no draws, and seven losses. On 2 January 2007, Wacker Burghausen appointed him as their manager. His first match was a 2–1 loss to Karlsruher SC on 21 January 2007. He left the club on 30 June 2007 when his contract expired. Wacker Burghausen finished in 17th place and were relegated. Six months later, on 11 December 2007, he was appointed manager of SpVgg Weiden. He finished the 2007–08 season with a record of six wins, four draws, and four losses. Weiden won promotion during the 2008–09 season, finishing in first place, finishing nine points ahead of TSV Aindling. He was with Weiden until 9 February 2010. His final match was a 1–0 win against 1. FC Nürnberg II on 13 December 2009.

=== 2010–15: Wehen Wiesbaden, Arminia Bielefeld and Duisburg ===
On 9 February 2010, Gino Lettieri joined Wehen Wiesbaden of the 3. Liga. His first 3 matches in charge were all losses, but they managed to avoid relegation by eight points. On 21 October 2010, Lettieri signed a new contract keeping him at the club until 30 June 2013. During the 2010–11 season, Wehen Wiesbaden narrowly missed out on the promotion playoff by a single point. Wehen Wiesbaden started the 2011–12 season with a 2–1 win against Werder Bremen II on 23 July 2011. On 15 February 2012 with the club dangerously hanging round the relegation zone, SV Wehen sacked him, and replaced him with Peter Vollmann the next day. Lattieri finished with a record of 31 wins, 21 draws, and 26 losses. He then became assistant coach of Arminia Bielefeld from 2012 to 2014.

He joined MSV Duisburg as their manager on 21 May 2014. He made his debut in a 3–1 loss to Jahn Regensburg on 26 July 2016. During the 2014–15 season, Duisburg defeated 1. FC Nürnberg 1–0 in the first round of the German Cup. However, they lost to 1. FC Köln in the second round of the German Cup on penalties after the match had finished in a 0–0 draw. Other results during the season include a 4–3 win against 1. FSV Mainz 05 II on 6 August 2014, a 3–1 win against his former club Wehen Wiesbaden on 29 November 2014, a 4–2 loss to Arminia Bielefeld on 15 February 2015, and a 4–1 win against Borussia Dortmund II on 21 March 2015. On 16 May 2015, Duisburg secured promotion to the 2. Bundesliga with a game to spare, after defeating Holstein Kiel 3–1. They finished the season in second place. Duisburg started the 2015–16 league season with two draws and seven losses. They were also knocked out of the German Cup by FC Schalke 04 who had defeated Duisburg 5–0. Lettieri was relieved of his duties on 2 November 2015, his final match was a 1–0 loss to 1860 Munich. Duisburg were in 18th and last place at the time of the sacking. He finished with a record of 22 wins, 15 draws, and 17 losses.

=== 2017–24: FSV Frankfurt, Korona Kielce, Return to Duisburg and FK Panevėžys ===
On 7 March 2017, he was appointed as the new manager of FSV Frankfurt als a successor to Roland Vrabec. He received a contract until the end of the 2016–17 season and was tasked with preventing the club's relegation from the 3. Liga. Since this goal was not achieved and FSV Frankfurt got relegated, he left the club the end of the season. In May 2017, he signed a contract with Ekstraklasa side Korona Kielce. In September 2019, Lettieri was sacked by Kielce after the team lost four games in a row.

Lettieri returned to MSV Duisburg on 11 November 2020 as the successor of Torsten Lieberknecht. He was sacked on 27 January 2021, after the team only won two out of twelve games under his lead. In October 2021, he joined Greek club AEK as an assistant under head coach Argiris Giannikis. In March 2022, both coaches left their positions at the club by mutual agreement.

In September 2022, Lettieri was appointed as the new coach of Lithuanian club FK Panevėžys, replacing Valdas Urbonas. At the end of the 2023 season, Panevėžys secured the first place in the A Lyga, twelve points ahead of second place team FK Žalgiris, becoming Lithuanian champions for the first time in history.

On 26 January 2026, Lettieri was appointed as the head coach of China League One club Meizhou Hakka.

== Managerial statistics ==
As of match played 24 April 2026

Managerial record by team and tenure
Team	Nat	From	To	Record							
Team	Nat	From	To	G	W	D	L	GF	GA	GD	Win %
Bayern Hof	(Germany)	3 April 1997	30 June 2000	108	40	24	44	157	165	−8	37.04
FC Augsburg	(Germany)	1 July 2000	30 June 2002	74	49	7	18	167	85	+82	66.22
Bonner SC	(Germany)	1 July 2002	11 September 2003	36	12	5	19	48	60	−12	33.33
SpVgg Bayreuth	(Germany)	11 September 2003	10 June 2006	93	41	30	22	159	116	+43	44.09
Darmstadt 98	(Germany)	10 June 2006	6 October 2006	11	3	0	8	10	18	−8	27.27
Wacker Burghausen	(Germany)	2 January 2007	30 June 2007	17	3	6	8	25	33	−8	17.65
SpVgg Weiden	(Germany)	11 December 2007	9 February 2010	68	38	13	17	126	91	+35	55.88
Wehen Wiesbaden	(Germany)	9 February 2010	15 February 2012	79	31	21	27	105	96	+9	39.24
MSV Duisburg	(Germany)	21 May 2014	2 November 2015	54	22	15	17	72	70	+2	40.74
FSV Frankfurt	(Germany)	7 March 2017	18 May 2017	13	1	3	9	9	23	−14	7.69
Korona Kielce	(Poland)	30 May 2017	2 September 2019	88	30	25	33	104	124	−20	34.09
MSV Duisburg	(Germany)	11 November 2020	27 January 2021	12	2	5	5	14	22	−8	16.67
Panevėžys	(Lithuania)	22 September 2022	15 May 2024	65	34	19	12	91	46	+45	52.31
Muangthong United	(Thailand)	6 July 2024	25 May 2025	45	21	8	16	83	65	+18	46.67
Uthai Thani	(Thailand)	26 May 2025	8 October 2025	7	0	3	4	6	15	−9	0.00
Wieczysta Kraków	(Poland)	10 October 2025	3 November 2025	3	0	1	2	7	9	−2	0.00
Meizhou Hakka F.C.	(China)	26 January 2026	24 April 2026	6	2	0	4	4	12	−8	33.33
Total				779	329	185	265	1,187	1,050	+137	42.23

== Honours ==
Panevėžys

- A Lyga: 2023
- Lithuanian Supercup: 2024

Muangthong United

- Thai FA Cup runner-up: 2024–25

Individual

- Ekstraklasa Coach of the Month: October 2017, November 2017
