= Nico Klotz =

German footballer

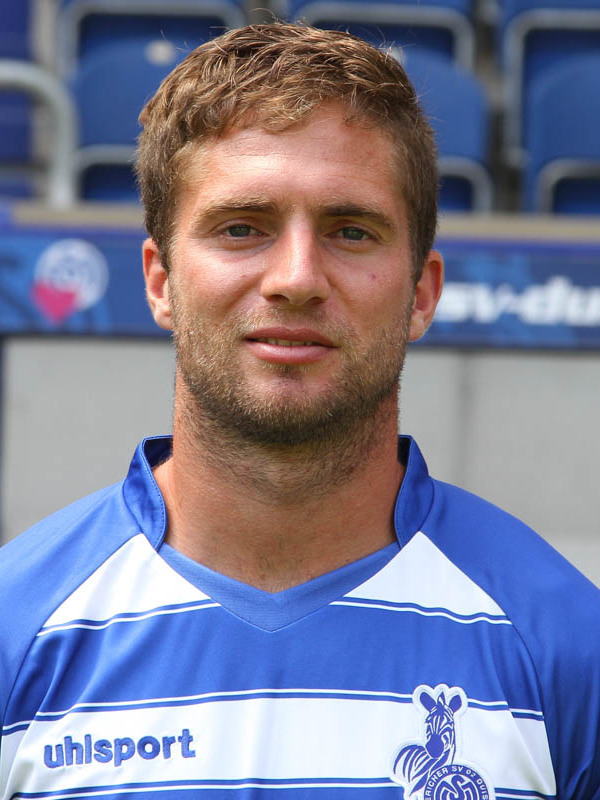
- Klotz with MSV Duisburg in 2015

Personal information
- Date of birth: 20 September 1986 (age 40)
- Place of birth: Heilbronn, West Germany
- Height: 1.73 m (5 ft 8 in)
- Positions: Defender; midfielder

Youth career
- –2007: VfL Brackenheim

Senior career*
Years	Team	Apps	(Gls)
2007–2009	VfB Stuttgart II	28	(2)
2009–2010	Erzgebirge Aue	26	(4)
2010–2012	SC Paderborn	11	(1)
2012–2014	SV Sandhausen	40	(4)
2014–2018	MSV Duisburg	80	(7)
2015	MSV Duisburg II	1	(0)
Total		186	(18)
- * Club domestic league appearances and goals

Nico Klotz (born 20 September 1986) is a German former professional footballer who played as a defender or midfielder.

== Career ==
Klotz joined MSV Duisburg for the 2014–15 season. On 9 May 2018, it was announced that he will leave Duisburg at the end of the 2017–18 season.

== Personal life ==
In March 2019, Klotz moved to Tus Mündelheim, a Bezirksliga team, while playing for their second team in the Kreisliga.
