= Michael Ratajczak =

German footballer

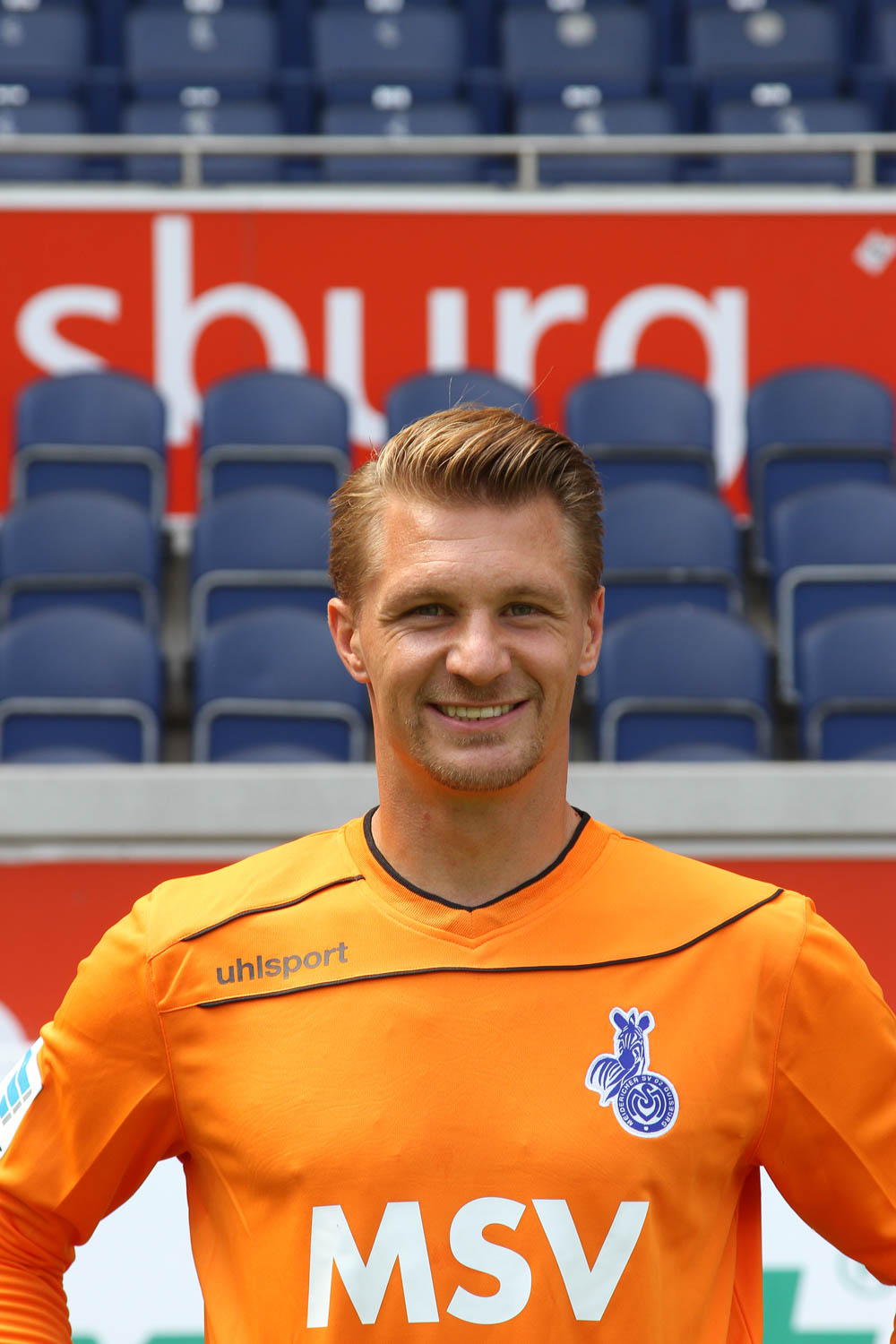
- Ratajczak with MSV Duisburg in 2015

Personal information
- Date of birth: 16 April 1982 (age 44)
- Place of birth: Herne, West Germany
- Height: 1.89 m (6 ft 2 in)
- Position: Goalkeeper

Team information
- Current team: Hannover 96 (goalkeeper coach)

Youth career
- SG Herten-Langenbochum
- 1994–1996: Schalke 04
- 1996–2001: Borussia Dortmund

Senior career*
Years	Team	Apps	(Gls)
2001–2003	Borussia Dortmund II	30	(0)
2003–2005	LR Ahlen	7	(0)
2005–2007	Rot-Weiß Erfurt	29	(0)
2007–2012	Fortuna Düsseldorf	78	(0)
2013	White Star Woluwe	6	(0)
2013–2016	MSV Duisburg	102	(0)
2017–2020	SC Paderborn	7	(0)
2020–2021	Hannover 96	3	(0)
Total		263	(0)

Managerial career
- 2021–: Hannover 96 (goalkeeper coach)
- * Club domestic league appearances and goals

Michael Ratajczak (born 16 April 1982) is a German former professional footballer who played as a goalkeeper. In summer 2021 he became the goalkeeper coach for Hannover 96.

== Personal life ==
Ratajczak was born in Germany, and is of distant Polish descent.

== Career statistics ==
Appearances and goals by club, season and competition
Club	Season	League			National cup		Europe		Other		Total	
Club	Season	Division	Apps	Goals	Apps	Goals	Apps	Goals	Apps	Goals	Apps	Goals
Borussia Dortmund II	2001–02	Oberliga Westfalen	12	0	—		—		—		12	0
Borussia Dortmund II	2002–03	Regionalliga Nord	18	0	—		—		—		18	0
Borussia Dortmund II	Total		30	0	—		—		—		30	0
Borussia Dortmund	2001–02	Bundesliga	0	0	0	0	0	0	—		0	0
Borussia Dortmund	2002–03	Bundesliga	0	0	0	0	0	0	—		0	0
Borussia Dortmund	Total		0	0	0	0	0	0	—		9	0
LR Ahlen	2003–04	2. Bundesliga	3	0	0	0	—		—		3	0
LR Ahlen	2004–05	2. Bundesliga	4	0	0	0	—		—		4	0
LR Ahlen	Total		7	0	0	0	—		—		7	0
Rot-Weiß Erfurt	2005–06	Regionalliga Nord	10	0	1	0	—		—		11	0
Rot-Weiß Erfurt	2006–07	Regionalliga Nord	19	0	0	0	—		—		19	0
Rot-Weiß Erfurt	Total		29	0	1	0	—		—		30	0
Fortuna Düsseldorf	2007–08	Regionalliga Nord	6	0	—		—		—		9	0
Fortuna Düsseldorf	2008–09	3. Liga	0	0	—		—		—			
Fortuna Düsseldorf	2009–10	2. Bundesliga	34	0	0	0	—		—		34	0
Fortuna Düsseldorf	2010–11	2. Bundesliga	15	0	1	0	—		—		16	0
Fortuna Düsseldorf	2011–12	2. Bundesliga	23	0	3	0	—		2	0	28	0
Fortuna Düsseldorf	Total		78	0	4	0	—		2	0	84	0
White Star Woluwe	2012–13	Belgian Second Division	6	0	—		—		6	0	12	0
MSV Duisburg	2013–14	3. Liga	33	0	1	0	—		—		34	0
MSV Duisburg	2014–15	3. Liga	36	0	2	0	—		—		38	0
MSV Duisburg	2015–16	2. Bundesliga	33	0	1	0	—		—		34	0
MSV Duisburg	Total		102	0	4	0	—		—		106	0
SC Paderborn	2016–17	3. Liga	2	0	—		—		—		2	0
SC Paderborn	2017–18	3. Liga	4	0	4	0	—		—		8	0
SC Paderborn	2018–19	2. Bundesliga	2	0	3	0	—		—		5	0
SC Paderborn	2019–20	Bundesliga	0	0	0	0	—		—		0	0
SC Paderborn	Total		8	0	7	0	—		—		15	0
Hannover 96	2019–20	2. Bundesliga	0	0	—		—		—		0	0
Hannover 96	2020–21	2. Bundesliga	3	0	1	0	—		—		4	0
Hannover 96	Total		3	0	1	0	—		—		4	0
Career total			263	0	17	0	0	0	8	0	288	0
