= Matthias Kühne =

German footballer

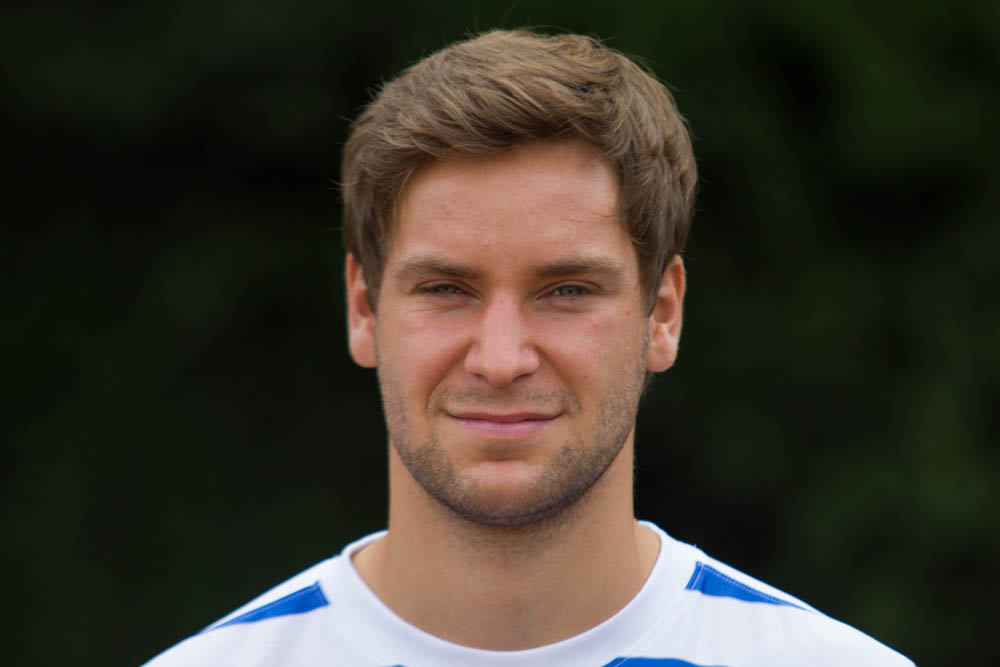
- Matthias Kühne in 2013

Personal information
- Date of birth: 27 September 1987 (age 39)
- Place of birth: Wurzen, East Germany
- Height: 1.79 m (5 ft 10 in)
- Position: Defender

Team information
- Current team: Einheit Rudolstadt

Youth career
- LSV Südwest
- Blau-Weiß Leipzig
- –2005: Lokomotive Leipzig
- 2005–2006: Sachsen Leipzig

Senior career*
Years	Team	Apps	(Gls)
2006–2008	Sachsen Leipzig	42	(0)
2008–2011	SV Elversberg	89	(2)
2011–2013	SV Babelsberg 03	57	(1)
2013–2016	MSV Duisburg	40	(0)
2016–2020	Carl Zeiss Jena	57	(3)
2021–2022	Einheit Rudolstadt	21	(3)
2022–	SG Taucha 99	0	(0)
- * Club domestic league appearances and goals as of 11 September 2023

Matthias Kühne (born 27 September 1987) is a German footballer who plays as a defender who plays for Einheit Rudolstadt in the NOFV-Oberliga Süd.

== Career ==
Kühne moved to Carl Zeiss Jena for the 2016–17 season.
