= Kevin Wolze =

German footballer

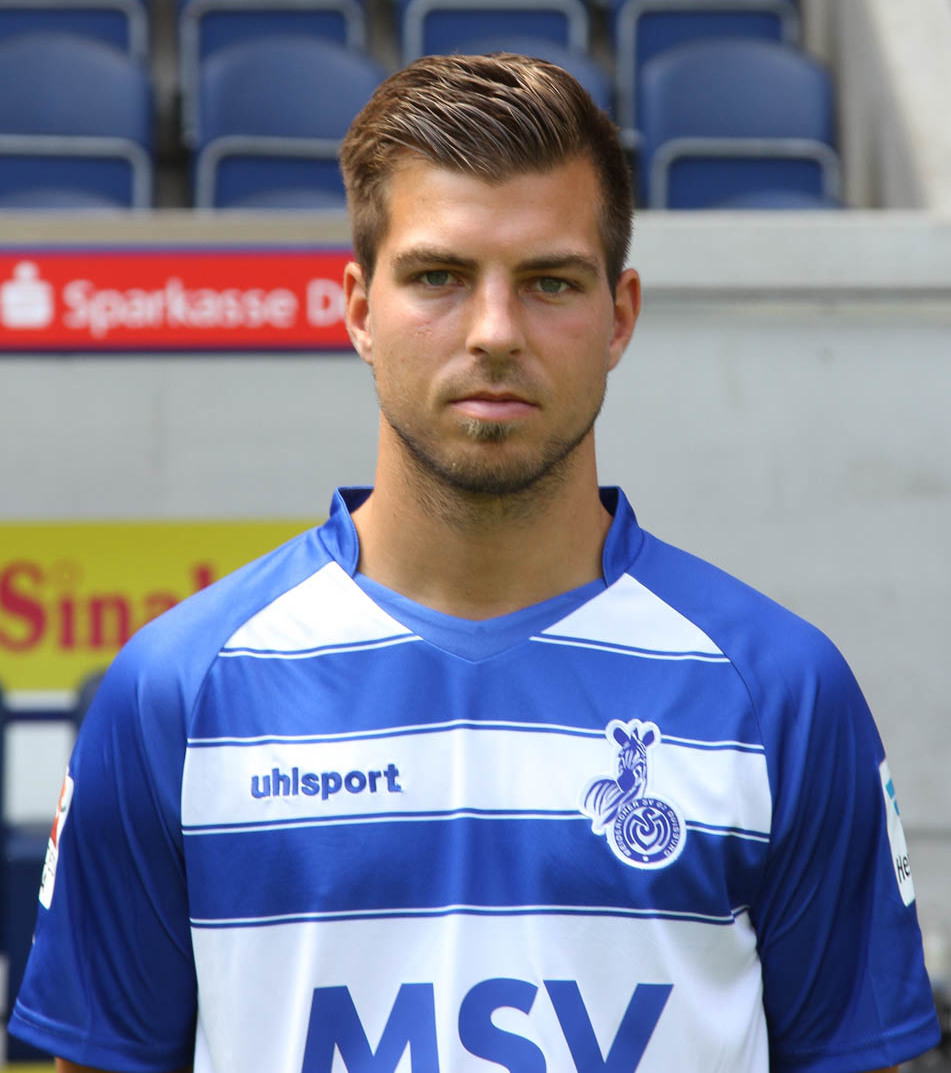
- Wolze with MSV Duisburg in 2015

Personal information
- Date of birth: 9 March 1990 (age 36)
- Place of birth: Wolfsburg, West Germany
- Height: 1.75 m (5 ft 9 in)
- Positions: Left-back; left midfielder

Youth career
- –2006: VfL Wolfsburg
- 2006–2008: Bolton Wanderers

Senior career*
Years	Team	Apps	(Gls)
2008–2011	VfL Wolfsburg II	71	(17)
2011–2019	MSV Duisburg	238	(33)
2019–2021	VfL Osnabrück	40	(2)
2021–2022	SV Straelen	8	(1)

International career
	Germany U16	8	(1)
	Germany U17	23	(4)
	Germany U18	7	(2)
	Germany U19	11	(1)
	Germany U20	2	(0)
- * Club domestic league appearances and goals

Kevin Wolze (born 9 March 1990) is a German former professional footballer who played as a left-back and left midfielder.

== Career ==
He joined MSV Duisburg in the summer of 2011, after he spent his youth playing with VfL Wolfsburg and the Bolton Wanderers with his first senior station being the second team of Wolfsburg.

In the season opener of the 2011–12 2. Bundesliga season against the Karlsruher SC, he scored two goals in a 2–3 loss. Those were his first goals in the first or second Bundesliga. The first goal was scored after just 17 seconds which was the third quickest goal in the history of the 2. Bundesliga.

After eight years in Duisburg, Wolze joined VfL Osnabrück for the 2019–20 season.

== International ==
He played at all German youth national teams.
