= Babacar M'Bengue =

German footballer (born 1991)

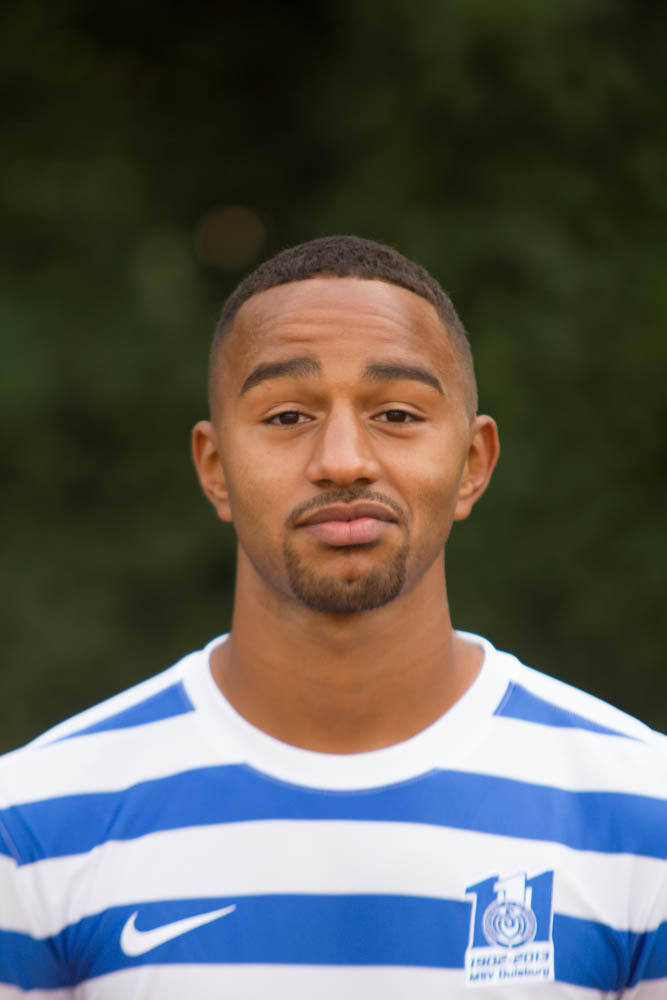
- M'Bengue in 2013

Personal information
- Date of birth: 29 October 1991 (age 35)
- Place of birth: Düsseldorf, Germany
- Height: 1.90 m (6 ft 3 in)
- Position: Centre-back

Team information
- Current team: Sportfreunde Baumberg

Youth career
- Garather SV
- –2009: Tuspo Richrath
- 2009–2010: Wuppertaler SV

Senior career*
Years	Team	Apps	(Gls)
2010–2011	Wuppertaler SV II	16	(0)
2010–2011	Wuppertaler SV	7	(0)
2010–2011	Wuppertaler SV	7	(0)
2011–2012	Fortuna Düsseldorf II	24	(0)
2012–2015	MSV Duisburg II	16	(0)
2013–2015	MSV Duisburg	3	(0)
2015–2016	SC Wiedenbrück	18	(0)
2016–2017	Wuppertaler SV	16	(1)
2017–2018	AS Calcio Kreuzlingen		
2019	SV Straelen	9	(0)
2019–2020	Bonner SC	6	(0)
2020–2021	TSV Eller 04	5	(0)
2021–2022	VfB Homberg	7	(1)
2022–2023	KFC Uerdingen	28	(1)
2023–2025	Sportfreunde Baumberg	28	(1)
2025–	Solingen 03	4	(0)
- * Club domestic league appearances and goals as of 17:49, 15 June 2023 (UTC)

Babacar M'Bengue (born 29 October 1991) is a German professional footballer who plays as a centre-back for Sportfreunde Baumberg.

== Career ==
After being promoted to the first team of MSV Duisburg in 2013, he joined SC Wiedenbrück in 2015.

In March 2021, M'Bengue agreed a move to Regionalliga West club VfB Homberg for the 2021–22 season.
