= Thomas Meißner =

German footballer (born 1991)

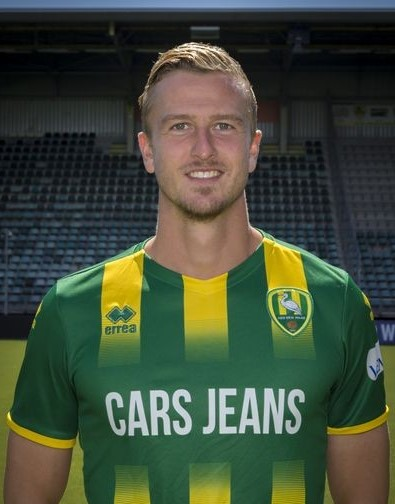
- Meißner in 2017

Personal information
- Date of birth: 26 March 1991 (age 35)
- Place of birth: Schweinfurt, Germany
- Height: 1.91 m (6 ft 3 in)
- Position: Centre-back

Team information
- Current team: 1. FC Schweinfurt 05
- Number: 8

Youth career
- FC Blau-Weiß Donnersdorf
- –2006: 1. FC Schweinfurt 05
- 2006–2009: 1860 Munich
- 2009–2010: Mainz 05

Senior career*
Years	Team	Apps	(Gls)
2010–2012	Mainz 05 II	63	(3)
2012–2014	Borussia Dortmund II	63	(1)
2014–2016	MSV Duisburg	59	(1)
2016–2018	ADO Den Haag	38	(0)
2018	→ Willem II (loan)	4	(0)
2018–2019	Willem II	25	(1)
2019–2021	Puskás Akadémia	53	(2)
2021–2024	Hansa Rostock	32	(0)
2022–2023	Hansa Rostock II	8	(1)
2024	Gostivari	15	(0)
2024–	1. FC Schweinfurt 05	44	(1)
- * Club domestic league appearances and goals as of 30 May 2026

Thomas Meißner (born 26 March 1991) is a German professional footballer who plays as a centre-back for 1. FC Schweinfurt 05.

== Career ==
Meißner joined MSV Duisburg for the 2014–15 season. On 14 July 2016, he moved to ADO Den Haag.

On 26 January 2024, Meißner's contract with Hansa Rostock was terminated by mutual consent.
