= Tim Albutat =

German footballer (born 1992)

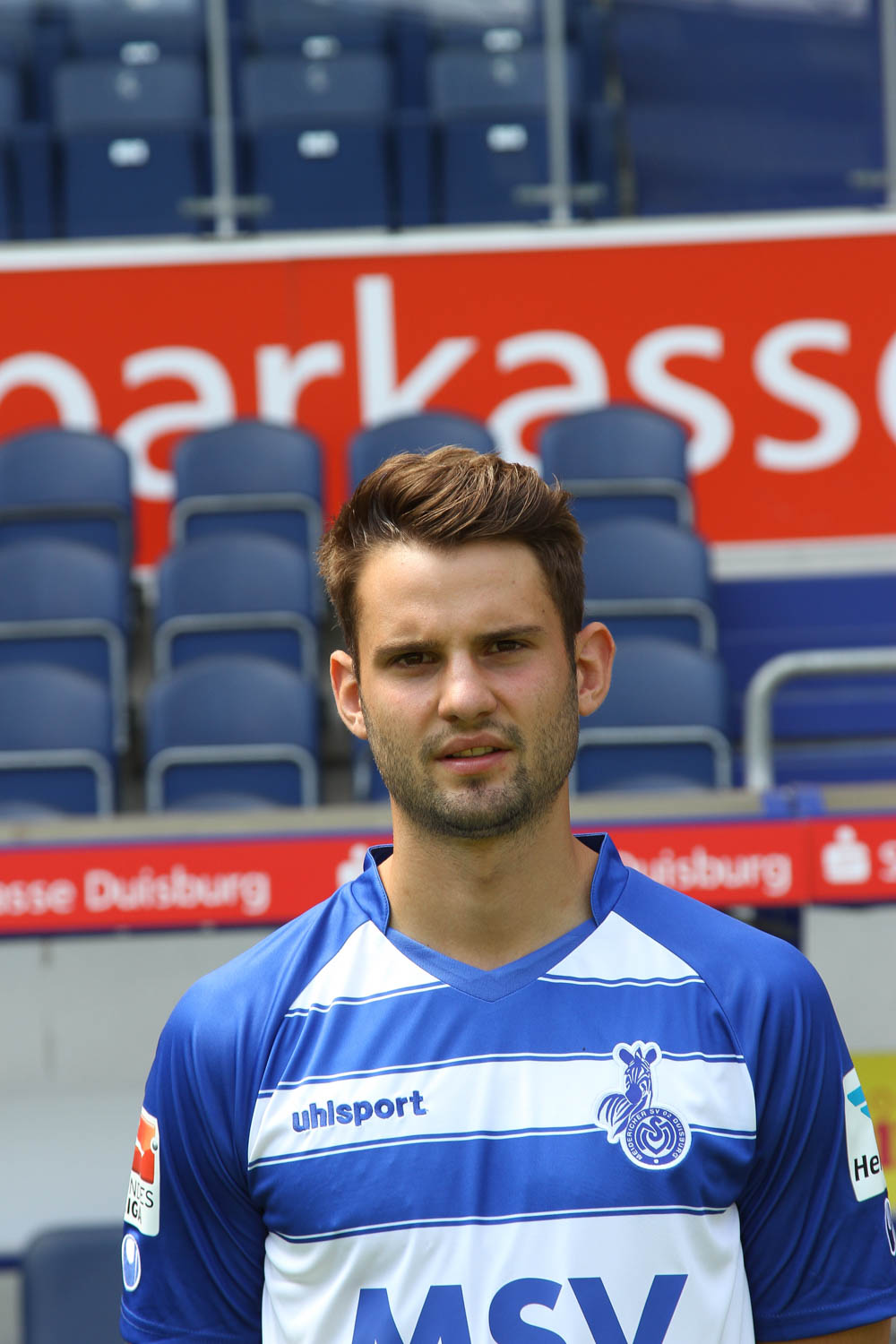
- Albutat in 2015

Personal information
- Date of birth: 23 September 1992 (age 34)
- Place of birth: Taunusstein, Germany
- Height: 1.84 m (6 ft 0 in)
- Position: Defensive midfielder

Youth career
- –2008: SV Wehen
- 2008–2011: SC Freiburg

Senior career*
Years	Team	Apps	(Gls)
2010–2016	SC Freiburg II	89	(4)
2013–2016	SC Freiburg	2	(0)
2014–2016	→ MSV Duisburg (loan)	56	(2)
2015	→ MSV Duisburg II (loan)	1	(0)
2016–2020	MSV Duisburg	94	(5)
2020–2021	KFC Uerdingen	19	(1)
2022–2025	Schalke 04 II	84	(3)

International career
2010	Germany U18	3	(0)
- * Club domestic league appearances and goals

Tim Albutat (born 23 September 1992) is a German former professional footballer who played as a defensive midfielder.

== Club career ==
Albutat made his professional debut in the Bundesliga on 11 May 2013 against SpVgg Greuther Fürth.

He joined MSV Duisburg for the 2014–15 season. He extended his contract on 12 June 2019.

After six years in Duisburg, he moved to KFC Uerdingen in the summer of 2020.

In May 2022, he signed with Schalke 04 II. He ended his football career in May 2025.

== International career ==
Albutat made three appearances for the German U18 national team.

== Career statistics ==
Appearances and goals by club, season and competition
Club	Season	League			Cup		Europe		Other		Total	
Club	Season	Division	Apps	Goals	Apps	Goals	Apps	Goals	Apps	Goals	Apps	Goals
SC Freiburg II	2010–11	Regionalliga Süd	1	0	—		—		—		1	0
SC Freiburg II	2011–12	Regionalliga Süd	26	0	—		—		—		26	0
SC Freiburg II	2012–13	Regionalliga Südwest	32	3	—		—		—		32	3
SC Freiburg II	2013–14	Regionalliga Südwest	30	1	—		—		—		30	1
SC Freiburg II	Total		89	4	—		—		—		89	4
SC Freiburg	2012–13	Bundesliga	1	0	0	0	—		—		1	0
SC Freiburg	2013–14	Bundesliga	1	0	0	0	2 (Note: Appearances in UEFA Europa League)	0	—		3	0
SC Freiburg	Total		2	0	0	0	2	0	—		4	0
MSV Duisburg	2014–15	3. Liga	33	1	2	0	—		—		35	1
MSV Duisburg	2015–16	2. Bundesliga	23	1	1	0	—		1 (Note: Appearance in 2. Bundesliga relegation playoffs)	0	25	1
MSV Duisburg	2016–17	3. Liga	32	2	1	0	—		—		33	2
MSV Duisburg	2017–18	2. Bundesliga	13	0	0	0	—		—		13	0
MSV Duisburg	2018–19	2. Bundesliga	16	1	0	0	—		—		16	1
MSV Duisburg	2019–20	3. Liga	33	2	2	1	—		—		35	3
MSV Duisburg	Total		150	7	6	1	—		1	0	157	8
MSV Duisburg II	2015–16	Oberliga Niederrhein	1	0	—		—		—		1	0
KFC Uerdingen	2020–21	3. Liga	19	1	—		—		—		19	1
Schalke 04 II	2022–23	Regionalliga West	30	0	—		—		—		30	0
Schalke 04 II	2023–24	Regionalliga West	28	1	—		—		—		28	1
Schalke 04 II	2024–25	Regionalliga West	26	2	—		—		—		26	2
Schalke 04 II	Total		84	3	—		—		—		84	3
Career total			345	15	6	1	2	0	1	0	354	16
