= Branimir Bajić =

Bosnia and Herzegovina footballer (born 1979)

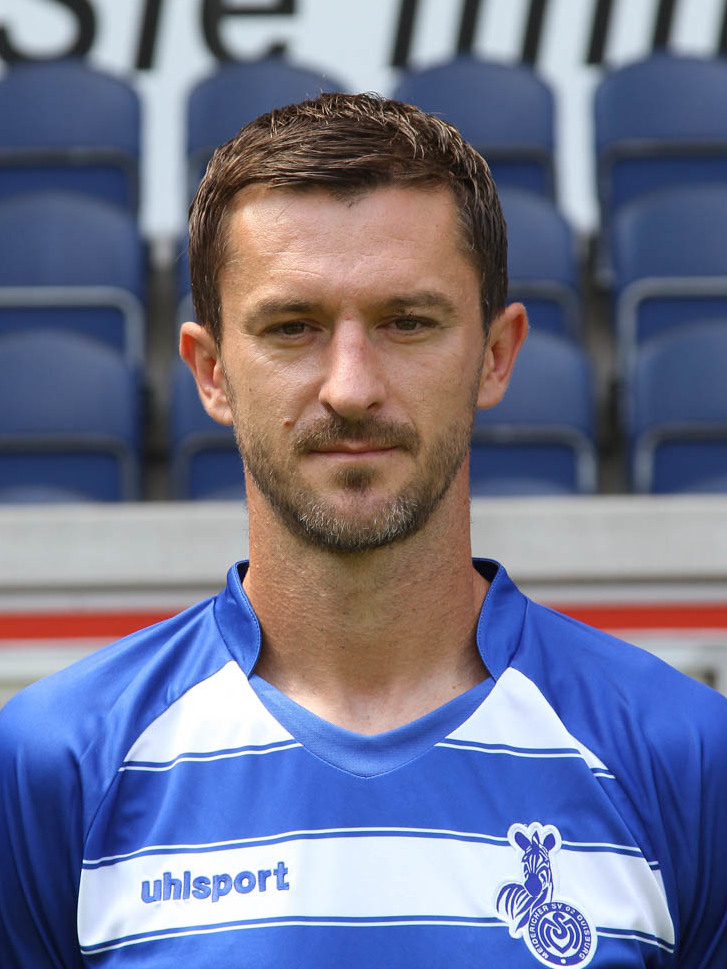
- Bajić with MSV Duisburg in 2015

Personal information
- Date of birth: 19 October 1979 (age 47)
- Place of birth: Bijeljina, SR Bosnia and Herzegovina, Yugoslavia
- Height: 1.87 m (6 ft 2 in)
- Position: Defender

Youth career
- Mladost Velika Obarska

Senior career*
Years	Team	Apps	(Gls)
1997–2000	Radnik Bijeljina	73	(0)
2000–2007	Partizan	114	(6)
2006	→ Al Wahda (loan)		
2007–2009	TuS Koblenz	55	(2)
2009–2010	Denizlispor	12	(1)
2010–2018	MSV Duisburg	208	(18)
Total		462	(27)

International career
2004–2008	Bosnia and Herzegovina	21	(0)
- * Club domestic league appearances and goals

Branimir Bajić (Cyrillic: Бранимир Бајић; born 19 October 1979) is a Bosnian former professional footballer who played as a defender.

== Club career ==
After playing for Radnik Bijeljina, Bajić was transferred to Partizan in July 2000. He scored a 90th-minute goal to give his team a 1–0 win over Rapid Wien in the first leg of the 2001–02 UEFA Cup first round. In May 2004, Bajić extended his contract with Partizan for another four years. He subsequently won his third championship with the club in the 2004–05 season. In February 2006, Bajić was loaned for six months to Emirati club Al Wahda with an option for a permanent deal. He eventually returned to Partizan and played regularly for the side in the 2006–07 season.

In June 2007, Bajić moved to Germany and signed with TuS Koblenz, on a three-year deal. He spent the next two seasons at the club, before transferring to Denizlispor in July 2009. After one year in Turkey, Bajić returned to Germany and signed with MSV Duisburg. On 9 May 2018, it was announced that he will leave Duisburg at the end of the 2017–18 season. After the season, he announced his retirement.

== International career ==
Bajić made his debut for Bosnia and Herzegovina in an August 2004 friendly match against France and has earned a total of 21 caps, scoring no goals. His final international was an August 2008 friendly against Bulgaria.

In September 2008, citing his dissatisfaction with the atmosphere in the national team following Ćiro Blažević's arrival at the helm of Bosnia and Herzegovina, in an interview for Sportski žurnal daily, Bajić announced his retirement from international football at the age of 28.

Couple of days later in Dnevni avaz newspaper, Bajić denied giving an interview to Sportski žurnal and announcing his international retirement.

== Honours ==
Partizan

- First League of FR Yugoslavia: 2001–02, 2002–03, 2004–05
- FR Yugoslavia Cup: 2000–01
