= Marcel Lenz (footballer, born 1991) =

German footballer

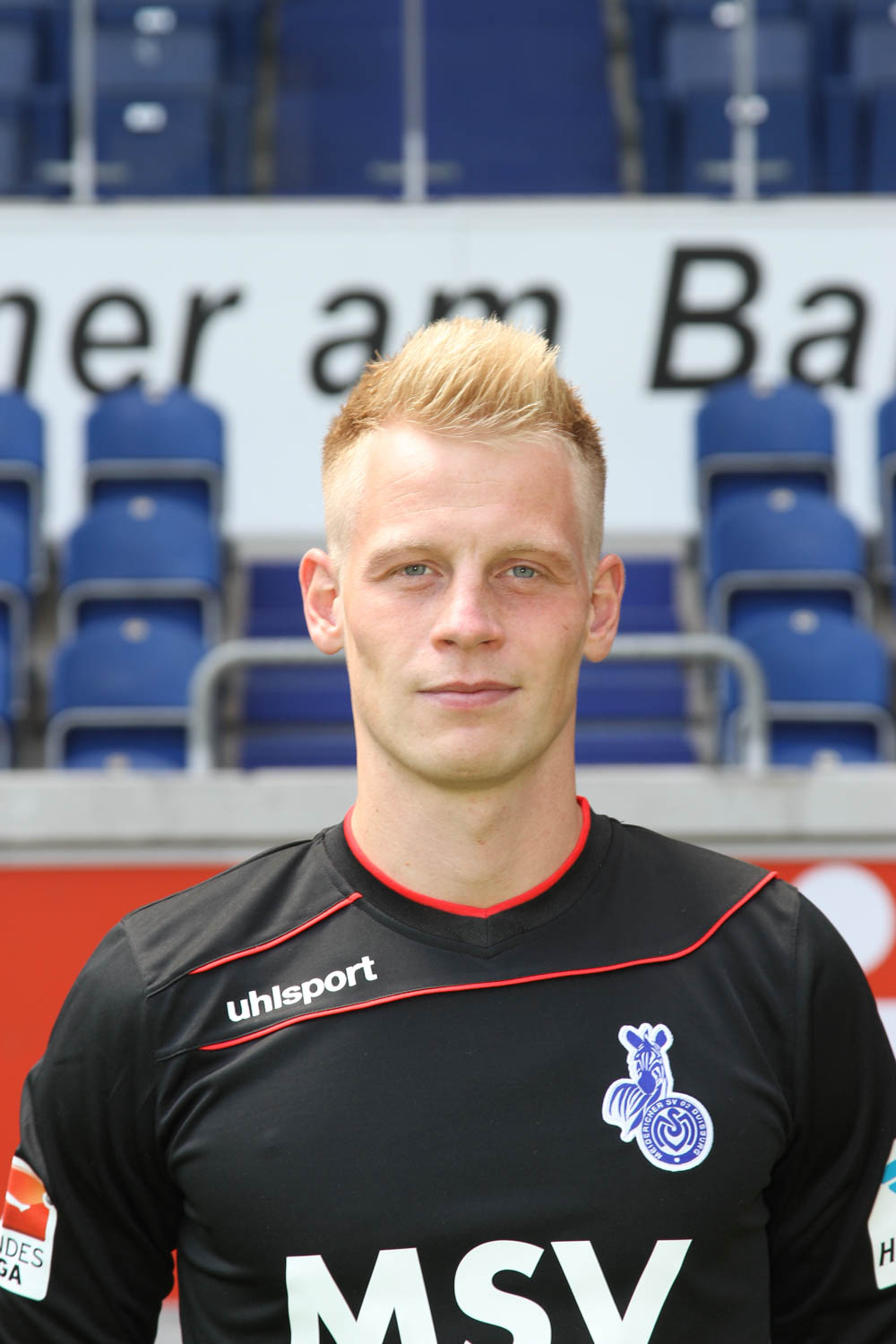
- Lenz in 2015

Personal information
- Date of birth: 3 May 1991 (age 35)
- Place of birth: Duisburg, Germany
- Height: 1.90 m (6 ft 3 in)
- Position: Goalkeeper

Team information
- Current team: SSVg Velbert
- Number: 1

Youth career
- 2009–2010: Schalke 04

Senior career*
Years	Team	Apps	(Gls)
2010–2016	MSV Duisburg II	89	(0)
2013–2017	MSV Duisburg	10	(0)
2017–2020	Rot-Weiss Essen	17	(0)
2020–2021	Schwarz-Weiß Essen	11	(0)
2021–	SSVg Velbert	137	(0)

International career
2006–2007	Germany U16	3	(0)
2007	Germany U17	1	(0)
2009	Germany U18	4	(0)
2010	Germany U19	2	(0)
- * Club domestic league appearances and goals as of 31 December 2025

Marcel Lenz (born 3 May 1991) is a German footballer for SSVg Velbert.

== Career ==
For the 2017–178 season he moved to Rot-Weiss Essen.

Lenz has represented the German youth national teams on various occasions, most recently at the U19 level.
