= Sascha Dum =

German footballer

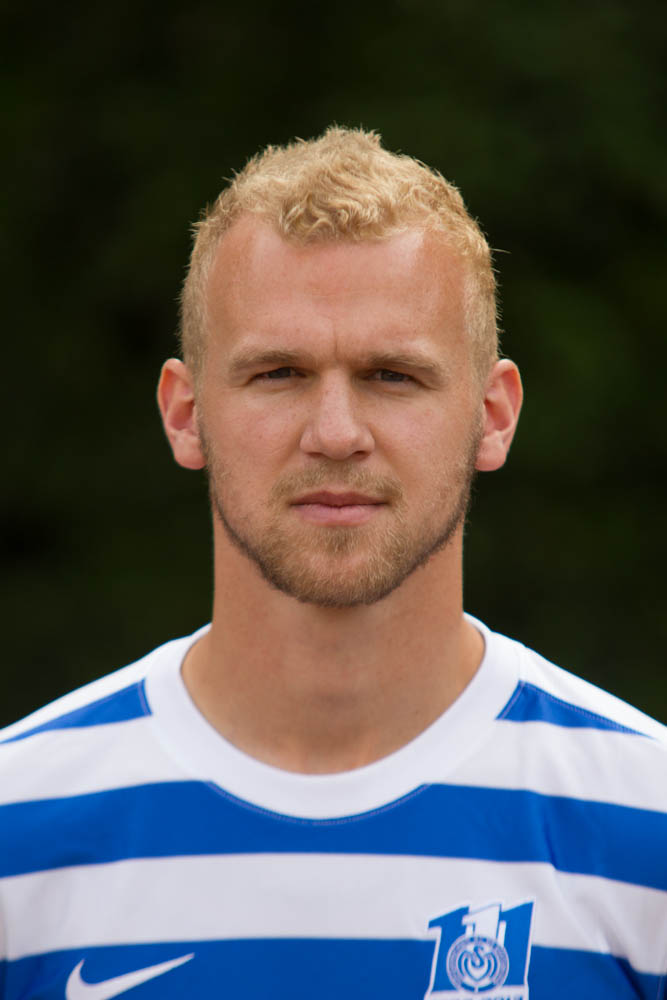
- Dum in 2013

Personal information
- Date of birth: 3 July 1986 (age 40)
- Place of birth: Leverkusen, West Germany
- Height: 1.88 m (6 ft 2 in)
- Position: Midfielder

Youth career
- 1993–1998: VfB Langenfeld
- 1998–2005: Bayer Leverkusen

Senior career*
Years	Team	Apps	(Gls)
2005–2006	Bayer Leverkusen II	19	(2)
2004–2010	Bayer Leverkusen	43	(0)
2006–2007	→ Alemannia Aachen (loan)	28	(2)
2006	→ Alemannia Aachen II (loan)	6	(1)
2009–2010	→ Energie Cottbus (loan)	21	(0)
2010–2012	Fortuna Düsseldorf II	2	(0)
2010–2012	Fortuna Düsseldorf	45	(1)
2013–2015	MSV Duisburg	47	(1)
2015	MSV Duisburg II	2	(0)
2015–2017	Schalke 04 II	49	(0)
2017–2018	VfB 03 Hilden	24	(2)
Total		286	(9)

International career
2004–2005	Germany U19	11	(0)
2007	Germany U20	1	(0)
2006–2007	Germany U21	5	(0)
- * Club domestic league appearances and goals

Sascha Dum (born 3 July 1986) is a German former professional footballer who played as a midfielder.

== Career ==
Dum signed a three-year professional contract with Bayer Leverkuse in January 2005. He then left for Alemannia Aachen on an 18-month loan in January 2006. On the last match day of the 2006–07 season, Leverkusen announced that Dum would be part of the new season squad. On 26 August 2009, he left Leverkusen as he was loaned to Energie Cottbus for the season.

After that, he signed with Fortuna Düsseldorf and MSV Duisburg.

On 24 August 2015, he signed with Schalke 04 II.

== Career statistics ==
=== Club ===
Appearances and goals by club, season and competition
Club	Season	League			DFB-Pokal		Europe		Other		Total	
Club	Season	Division	App.	Goals	App.	Goals	App.	Goals	App.	Goals	App.	Goals
Bayer Leverkusen II	2004–05	Oberliga Nordrhein	1	0	0	0	–		0	0	1	0
Bayer Leverkusen II	2005–06	Regionalliga Nord	7	0	0	0	–		0	0	7	0
Bayer Leverkusen II	2007–08	Oberliga Nordrhein	7	1	1	0	–		0	0	8	1
Bayer Leverkusen II	2008–09	Regionalliga West	4	1	0	0	–		0	0	4	1
Bayer Leverkusen II	Total		19	2	0	0	0	0	0	0	19	2
Bayer Leverkusen	2004–05	Bundesliga	5	0	1	0	0	0	2	0	8	0
Bayer Leverkusen	2005–06	Bundesliga	1	0	0	0	0	0	0	0	1	0
Bayer Leverkusen	2007–08	Bundesliga	17	0	2	0	4	0	0	0	23	0
Bayer Leverkusen	2008–09	Bundesliga	20	0	1	0	0	0	0	0	21	0
Bayer Leverkusen	Total		43	0	4	0	4	0	2	0	53	0
Alemannia Aachen II (loan)	2005–06	Oberliga Nordrhein	6	1	0	0	–		0	0	6	1
Alemannia Aachen (loan)	2005–06	2. Bundesliga	6	0	0	0	0	0	0	0	6	0
Alemannia Aachen (loan)	2006–07	Bundesliga	22	2	4	0	0	0	0	0	26	2
Alemannia Aachen (loan)	Total		28	2	4	0	0	0	0	0	32	2
Energie Cottbus (loan)	2009–10	2. Bundesliga	21	0	1	0	0	0	0	0	22	0
Fortuna Düsseldorf II	2010–11	Regionalliga West	1	0	0	0	–		0	0	1	0
Fortuna Düsseldorf II	2011–12	Regionalliga West	1	0	0	0	–		0	0	1	0
Fortuna Düsseldorf II	Total		2	0	0	0	0	0	0	0	2	0
Fortuna Düsseldorf	2010–11	2. Bundesliga	21	0	1	0	0	0	0	0	22	0
Fortuna Düsseldorf	2011–12	2. Bundesliga	24	1	3	0	0	0	0	0	27	1
Fortuna Düsseldorf	Total		45	1	4	0	0	0	0	0	49	1
MSV Duisburg	2012–13	2. Bundesliga	11	0	0	0	0	0	0	0	11	0
MSV Duisburg	2013–14	3. Liga	20	0	1	0	0	0	0	0	21	0
MSV Duisburg	2014–15	3. Liga	16	1	1	0	0	0	0	0	17	1
MSV Duisburg	Total		47	1	2	0	0	0	0	0	49	1
MSV Duisburg II	2014–15	Oberliga Niederrhein	2	0	0	0	–		0	0	2	0
Schalke 04	2015–16	Regionalliga West	26	0	0	0	–		0	0	26	0
Schalke 04	2016–17	Regionalliga West	23	0	0	0	–		0	0	23	0
Schalke 04	Total		49	0	0	0	0	0	0	0	49	0
VfB 03 Hilden	2017–18	Oberliga Niederrhein	24	2	0	0	–		0	0	24	2
Career total			286	9	16	0	4	0	2	0	308	9
