= Pierre de Wit =

German former professional footballer (born 1987)

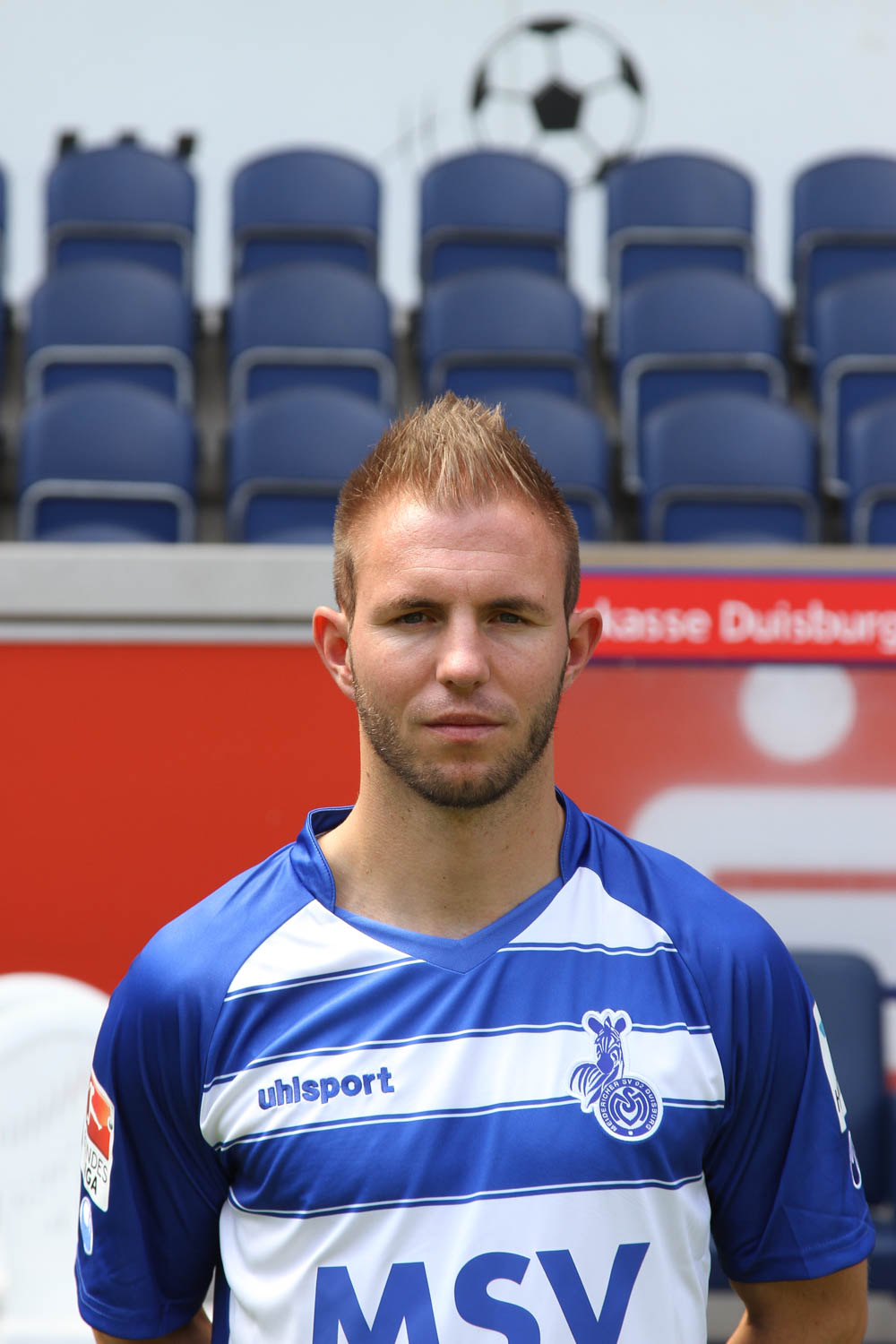
- Pierre de Wit in 2015

Personal information
- Full name: Pierre Marcel de Wit
- Date of birth: 26 September 1987 (age 39)
- Place of birth: Cologne, West Germany
- Height: 1.72 m (5 ft 8 in)
- Position: Midfielder

Youth career
- 1992–2005: SC Köln Weiler Volkhoven
- 2005–2006: Bayer Leverkusen

Senior career*
Years	Team	Apps	(Gls)
2006–2007	Bayer Leverkusen II	50	(10)
2007–2009	Bayer Leverkusen	4	(0)
2007–2009	→ VfL Osnabrück (loan)	47	(5)
2010–2013	1. FC Kaiserslautern	41	(3)
2013–2016	MSV Duisburg	49	(2)
Total		191	(20)
- * Club domestic league appearances and goals

Pierre Marcel de Wit (born 26 September 1987) is a German former professional footballer who played as a midfielder.

== Early life ==
Pierre was born in Köln to Lothar and Monika de Wit and grew up in the suburban Chorweiler.

== Career ==
De Wit began his career 1992 with SC Köln Weiler Volkhoven and in 2005, he was scouted by Bayer 04 Leverkusen. After one year in the A-Youth (U-19) of the club, he was promoted to the Regionalliga team, and earned his first professional games. In July 2007 he was called for the Bundesliga team of Leverkusen. He gave his debut on 8 November 2006 in 3–1 win over VfL Bochum. After the season, de Wit left Leverkusen and joined VfL Osnabrück on loan. He played for VfL Osnabrück for two years, earning 47 caps, and scoring five goals. On 30 June 2009, he returned to Leverkusen. After his return he only played for Leverkusen's reserve team.

On 3 December 2009, de Wit announced his signing with 1. FC Kaiserslautern.

On 5 August 2013, he joined MSV Duisburg on a three-year contract until June 2016.

== Personal life ==
He is married to a Turkish-German woman Sevgi Özdamar. The couple has a daughter – Amelie, born in May 2011. Pierre's uncle is the former 2. Bundesliga player Dirk de Wit.
