= Martin Dausch =

German footballer

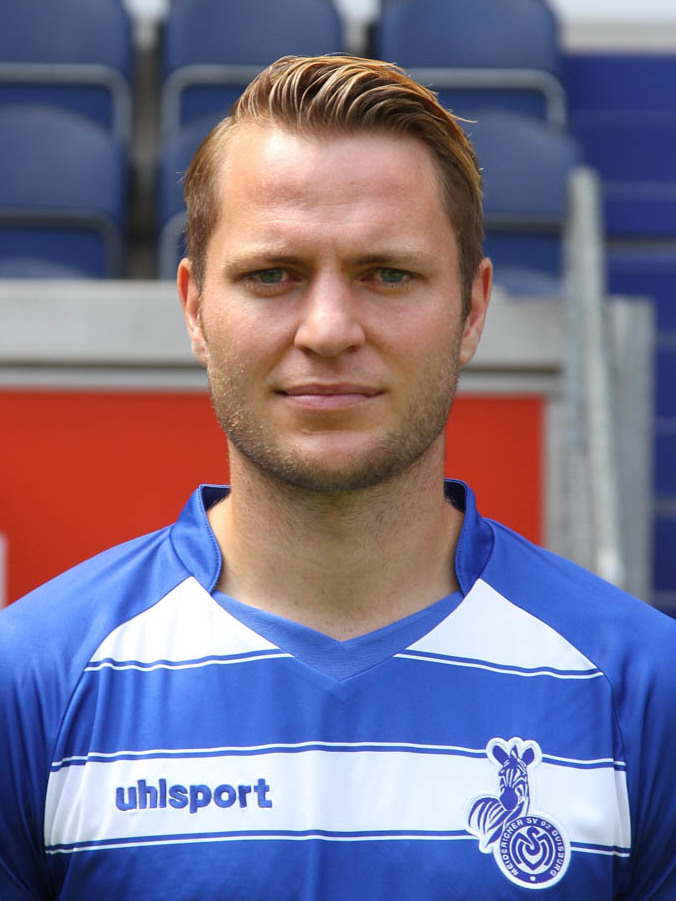
- Dausch in 2015

Personal information
- Date of birth: 4 March 1986 (age 40)
- Place of birth: Memmingen, West Germany
- Height: 1.75 m (5 ft 9 in)
- Position: Midfielder

Team information
- Current team: TSV Kottern
- Number: 8

Youth career
- SC Ronsberg
- SSV Markt Rettenbach
- SSV Ulm
- –2003: 1860 Munich
- 2003–2005: FC Memmingen

Senior career*
Years	Team	Apps	(Gls)
2004–2006	FC Memmingen	20	(7)
2006–2009	VfB Stuttgart II	47	(5)
2009–2013	VfR Aalen	118	(25)
2013–2015	Union Berlin	30	(1)
2015–2017	MSV Duisburg	46	(5)
2017–2019	1. FC Saarbrücken	30	(5)
2019–2021	RW Hasborn	25	(8)
2021–2023	FC Memmingen	36	(4)
2023–	TSV Kottern	21	(1)
- * Club domestic league appearances and goals as of 20 July 2024

Martin Dausch (born 4 March 1986) is a German footballer who plays as a midfielder for Bayernliga club TSV Kottern.

== Career ==
Dausch signed with MSV Duisburg on 11 January 2015.

For the 2017–18 season, he moved to 1. FC Saarbrücken.

Dausch retired from professional-level football in 2019.
