= Steffen Bohl =

German football player for SV Elversberg

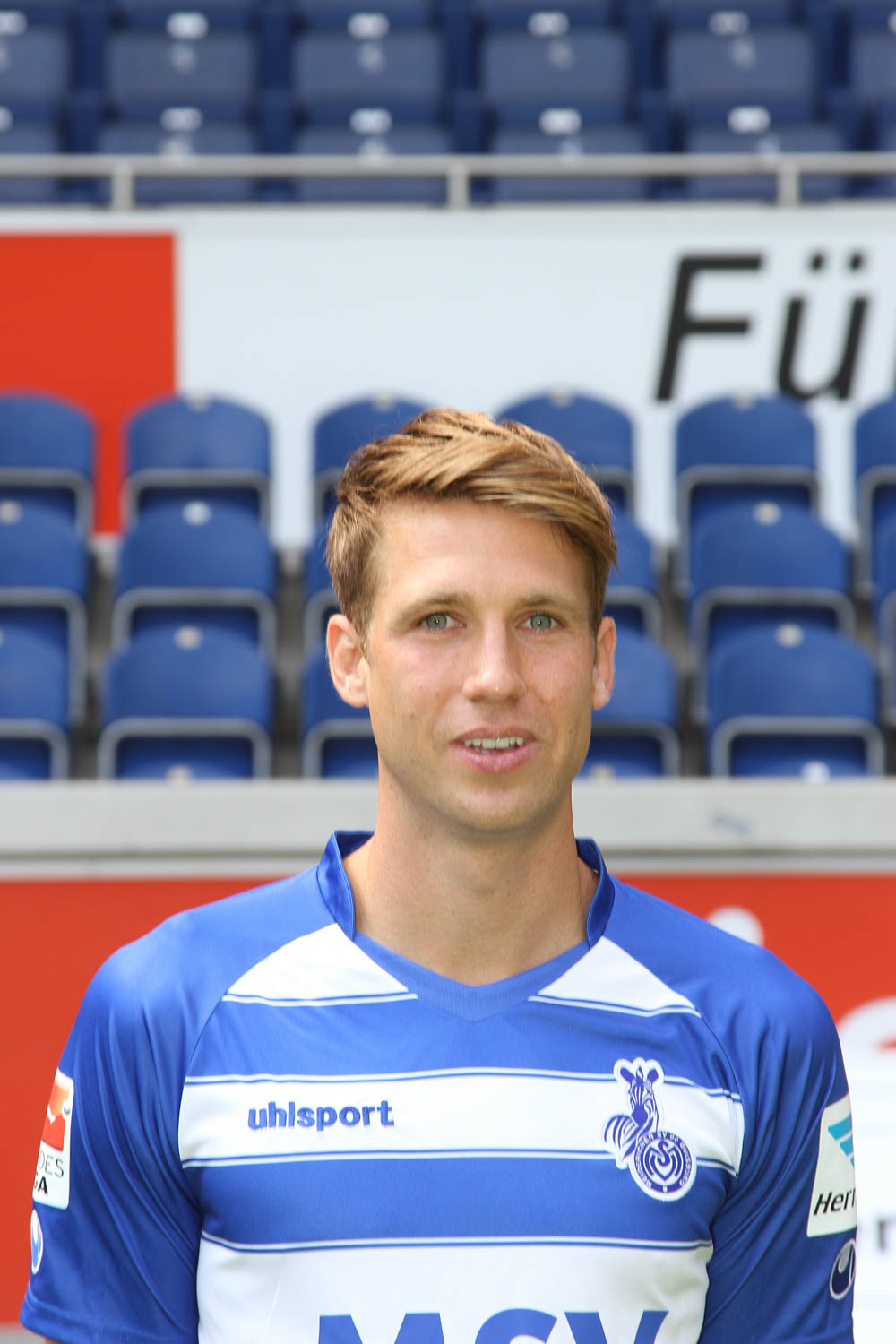

Personal information
- Date of birth: 28 December 1983 (age 42)
- Place of birth: Bad Dürkheim, West Germany
- Height: 1.83 m (6 ft 0 in)
- Position: Midfielder

Youth career
- –1997: TuS Wachenheim
- 1997–2003: VfL Neustadt/Weinstraße
- 2003–2005: SV Weingarten

Senior career*
Years	Team	Apps	(Gls)
2005–2006	1. FC Kaiserslautern II	30	(8)
2006–2008	1. FC Kaiserslautern	48	(9)
2008–2009	VfR Aalen	32	(6)
2009–2011	Wehen Wiesbaden	46	(8)
2009–2011	→ Wehen Wiesbaden II	5	(2)
2011–2013	Eintracht Braunschweig	33	(1)
2011–2012	→ Eintracht Braunschweig II	4	(0)
2013–2014	Energie Cottbus	7	(0)
2014–2016	MSV Duisburg	60	(4)
2016–2018	SV Elversberg	28	(2)
2016–2019	SV Elversberg II	13	(12)
Total		306	(52)
- * Club domestic league appearances and goals

Steffen Bohl (born 28 December 1983) is a German retired footballer.

== Career ==
Bohl started to play football with TuS Wachenheim, where he stayed until 1997. At the age of 14, he joined VfL Neustadt/Weinstraße and later SV Weingarten. As an important player in Weingarten he had the opportunity to go to the reserve squad of 1. FC Kaiserslautern in the third-tier Regionalliga, where he scored six times in 23 games during the 2005–06 season. He played in two of the final three games of the first squad in the Bundesliga, but had to see his club going down to the 2. Bundesliga.

There he became a frequent starter and scored six times during the 2006–07 season. He demonstrated his prowess during the game against TuS Koblenz, when he scored two times after a 0–2 and lead his squad to a 4–3 victory.

After the 2007–08 season, Bohl left Kaiserslautern and joined 3. Liga club VfR Aalen. On 2 June 2009, he signed a contract with SV Wehen Wiesbaden and transferred to Eintracht Braunschweig in January 2011. With Braunschweig, Bohl won promotion twice – from the 3. Liga to the 2. Bundesliga in 2011, and from the 2. Bundesliga to the Bundesliga in 2013. However, his contract in Braunschweig was not renewed after the 2012–13 season.

He joined MSV Duisburg for the 2014–15 season.

On 16 July 2016, he moved to SV Elversberg.
