= Gökhan Lekesiz =

German footballer

Gökan Lekesiz
Personal information
- Date of birth: 25 January 1991 (age 35)
- Place of birth: Viersen, Germany
- Height: 1.78 m (5 ft 10 in)
- Position: Forward

Team information
- Current team: Türkgücü Ratingen
- Number: 17

Youth career
- Borussia Mönchengladbach

Senior career*
Years	Team	Apps	(Gls)
2010–2011	Alemannia Aachen II		
2012–2013	Rot-Weiß Oberhausen II	27	(20)
2012–2013	Rot-Weiß Oberhausen	7	(0)
2013–2015	MSV Duisburg II	55	(43)
2013–2015	MSV Duisburg	6	(0)
2015–2016	Fortuna Sittard	28	(5)
2016–2017	Wiedenbrück 2000	32	(9)
2017–2018	Sancaktepe	13	(2)
2018–2019	Amed	19	(2)
2019–2020	SV Straelen	17	(5)
2020–2021	Wegberg-Beeck	10	(0)
2021–2022	FSV Duisburg	8	(1)
2022–2023	Hilal-Maroc Bergheim	13	(8)
2023–2024	MSV Düsseldorf	5	(0)
2024	ASV Süchteln	14	(1)
2024–	Türkgücü Ratingen	13	(5)
- * Club domestic league appearances and goals as of 22:09, 16 November 2024 (UTC)

Gökhan Lekesiz (born 25 January 1991) is a German footballer who most recently played as a forward for Türkgücü Ratingen.

== Career ==
He was promoted to the first team of MSV Duisburg in 2014.

In 2015, he was signed by Fortuna Sittard.
