= 2013–14 MSV Duisburg season =

MSV Duisburg
2013–14 season
- Manager: Karsten Baumann
- 3. Liga: 7th place
- DFB-Pokal: First round
- Niederrheinpokal: Winners
- Top goalscorer: League: Kingsley Onuegbu (13); All: Kingsley Onuegbu (19)
- Highest home attendance: 21,243
- Lowest home attendance: 9,066
- Average home league attendance: 12,824
Home colours	Away colours	Third colours

The 2013–14 MSV Duisburg season was the 114th season in the club's football history. In 2013–14 the club played in the 3. Liga, the third tier of German football. Duisburg was forced to play in the 3. Liga after their licence for the 2. Bundesliga was rejected by the DFL.

After it was announced that Duisburg would not play in the 2. Bundesliga in 2013–14, many players left the team, including coach Kosta Runjaić. As a result, Karsten Baumann and the new build front office had to build a new team quickly before the season started. The squad was introduced only ten days before the kickoff of the new season.

They finished 7th in the league and qualified for the 2014–15 DFB-Pokal, after losing in the first round in this year, by winning the Niederrheinpokal.

== Results ==
=== League table ===
Pos	Team	Pld	W	D	L	GF	GA	GD	Pts
5	VfL Osnabrück	38	15	10	13	50	39	+11	55
6	Preußen Münster	38	13	14	11	55	50	+5	53
7	MSV Duisburg	38	13	13	12	43	43	0	52
8	Stuttgarter Kickers	38	13	12	13	45	46	−1	51
9	Hallescher FC	38	14	9	15	50	55	−5	51

Source: kicker.de
Rules for classification: 1) points; 2) goal difference; 3) number of goals scored.

==== Results summary ====
Overall								Home						Away					
Pld	W	D	L	GF	GA	GD	Pts	W	D	L	GF	GA	GD	W	D	L	GF	GA	GD
38	13	13	12	43	43	0	52	7	7	5	25	22	+3	6	6	7	18	21	−3

Last updated: 10 May 2014.
Source: kicker.de

==== Result round by round ====
Round	1	2	3	4	5	6	7	8	9	10	11	12	13	14	15	16	17	18	19	20	21	22	23	24	25	26	27	28	29	30	31	32	33	34	35	36	37	38
Ground	H	A	H	A	H	A	H	A	H	A	H	A	H	A	H	A	H	H	A	H	A	A	H	A	H	A	H	A	H	A	H	A	H	A	H	A	A	H
Result	L	W	W	D	D	W	L	L	L	W	W	L	D	D	D	W	L	W	L	D	D	D	W	D	W	L	D	L	D	W	W	W	D	L	W	D	L	L
Position	15	9	8	8	8	5	7	9	14	11	8	10	10	11	11	8	11	8	9	9	8	10	9	9	7	8	8	9	11	9	6	6	6	7	6	5	6	7

Updated to match(es) played on 10 May 2014. Source: kicker.de
A = Away; H = Home; W = Win; D = Draw; L = Loss

=== 3. Liga ===
20 July 2013 1	MSV Duisburg	0–1	1. FC Heidenheim	Duisburg
14:00		Report	Griesbeck 75'	Stadium: MSV-Arena; Attendance: 18,111; Referee: Sascha Stegemann (Niederkassel)

27 July 2013 2	Wacker Burghausen	0–2	MSV Duisburg	Burghausen
14:00		Report	Bollmann 40'; Onuegbu 88'	Stadium: Wacker-Arena; Attendance: 2,200; Referee: René Rohde (Rostock)

10 August 2013 3	MSV Duisburg	2–1	SSV Jahn Regensburg	Duisburg
14:00	Onuegbu 38'; Tsourakis 86'	Report	Aosman 2'	Stadium: MSV-Arena; Attendance: 13,422; Referee: Arno Blos (Deizisau)

18 August 2013 4	RB Leipzig	1–1	MSV Duisburg	Leipzig
14:00	Jung 33'	Report	Onuegbu 26'	Stadium: Red Bull Arena; Attendance: 13,758; Referee: Christian Dietz (Kronach)

24 August 2013 5	MSV Duisburg	1–1	Chemnitzer FC	Duisburg
14:00	Onuegbu 20'	Report	Förster 41'	Stadium: MSV-Arena; Attendance: 14,368; Referee: Bibiana Steinhaus (Hanover)

31 August 2013 6	FC Rot-Weiß Erfurt	1–3	MSV Duisburg	Erfurt
14:00	Brandstetter 88'	Report	Wolze 15', 39'; Onuegbu 75'	Stadium: Steigerwaldstadion; Attendance: 5,540; Referee: Peter Sippel (Munich)

3 September 2013 7	MSV Duisburg	1–2	Borussia Dortmund II	Duisburg
19:00	Onuegbu 45'	Report	Ducksch 8'; Amini 33'	Stadium: MSV-Arena; Attendance: 21,243; Referee: Marcel Unger (Halle/Saale)

8 September 2013 8	SV Wehen Wiesbaden	2–0	MSV Duisburg	Wiesbaden
14:00	Jänicke 85'; Nandzik 90+2'	Report		Stadium: BRITA-Arena; Attendance: 4,790; Referee: Thorsten Schriever (Dorum)

14 September 2013 9	MSV Duisburg	0–4	SV Darmstadt 98	Duisburg
14:00		Report	Sailer 10'; Stroh-Engel 17'; Sulu 34'; Heller 79'	Stadium: MSV-Arena; Attendance: 12,744; Referee: Daniel Siebert (Berlin)

21 September 2013 10	Holstein Kiel	0–1	MSV Duisburg	Kiel
14:00		Report	de Wit 12'	Stadium: Holstein-Stadion; Attendance: 6,030; Referee: Patrick Ittrich (Hamburg)

27 September 2013 11	MSV Duisburg	2–0	F.C. Hansa Rostock	Duisburg
19:00	Onuegbu 32'; Bollmann 72'	Report		Stadium: MSV-Arena; Attendance: 14,271; Referee: Thorben Siewer (Drolshagen)

5 October 2013 12	SV Elversberg	1–0	MSV Duisburg	Spiesen-Elversberg
14:00	Salem 76'	Report		Stadium: Waldstadion; Attendance: 2,800; Referee: Jonas Weickenmeier (Frankfurt)

19 October 2013 13	MSV Duisburg	3–3	1. FC Saarbrücken	Duisburg
14:00	Onuegbu 8', 39'; Wolze 64'	Report	Ziemer 48'; Korte 54'; Hoffmann 79'	Stadium: MSV-Arena; Attendance: 12,764; Referee: Timo Gerach (Landau)

26 October 2013 14	VfB Stuttgart II	1–1	MSV Duisburg	Stuttgart
14:00	Rathgeb 17'	Report	Feisthammel 31'	Stadium: Gazi-Stadion auf der Waldau; Attendance: 1,200; Referee: Malte Dittrich (Bremen)

2 November 2013 15	MSV Duisburg	1–1	Stuttgarter Kickers	Duisburg
14:00	Ofosu-Ayeh 87'	Report	Soriano 83'	Stadium: MSV-Arena; Attendance: 12,019; Referee: Florian Badstübner (Windsbach)

10 November 2013 16	VfL Osnabrück	0–1	MSV Duisburg	Osnabrück
14:00		Report	Gardawski 62'	Stadium: Osnatel-Arena; Attendance: 11,124; Referee: Tobias Welz (Wiesbaden)

23 November 2013 17	MSV Duisburg	1–3	Hallescher FC	Duisburg
14:00	Wolze 18'	Report	Gogia 6'; Franke 31'; Furuholm 40'	Stadium: MSV-Arena; Attendance: 10,722; Referee: Benjamin Cortus (Röthenbach)

30 November 2013 18	MSV Duisburg	3–0	SpVgg Unterhaching	Duisburg
14:00	Zoundi 68'; Onuegbu 80'; Aycicek 90'	Report		Stadium: MSV-Arena; Attendance: 9,066; Referee: Robert Schröder (Hanover)

7 December 2013 19	Preußen Münster	2–1	MSV Duisburg	Münster
14:00	Grote 59'; Scherder 90+1'	Report	de Wit 8'	Stadium: Preußenstadion; Attendance: 10,116; Referee: Karl Valentin (Taufkirchen)

14 December 2013 20	MSV Duisburg	1–1	SV Wacker Burghausen	Duisburg
14:00	Yeşilyurt 84'	Report	Benčík 77'	Stadium: MSV-Arena; Attendance: 9,636; Referee: Arne Aarnink (Nordhorn)

21 December 2013 21	1. FC Heidenheim	2–2	MSV Duisburg	Heidenheim
14:00	Schnatterer 43'; Mayer 75' (pen.)	Report	Zoundi 4'; Onuegbu 90+3'	Stadium: Voith-Arena; Attendance: 8,600; Referee: Harm Osmers (Hanover)

25 January 2014 22	SSV Jahn Regensburg	1–1	MSV Duisburg	Regensburg
14:00	Dressler 54'	Report	Zoundi 45+2'	Stadium: Jahnstadion; Attendance: 3,069; Referee: Christian Dingert (Lebecksmühle)

1 February 2014 23	MSV Duisburg	2–1	RB Leipzig	Duisburg
14:00	Aycicek 29'; Onuegbu 90+1'	Report	Frahn 56'	Stadium: MSV-Arena; Attendance: 11,012; Referee: Thorsten Kinhöfer (Herne)

8 February 2014 24	Chemnitzer FC	0–0	MSV Duisburg	Chemnitz
14:00		Report		Stadium: Stadion an der Gellertstraße; Attendance: 4,146; Referee: Norbert Grudzinski (Hamburg)

15 February 2014 25	MSV Duisburg	3–2	FC Rot-Weiß Erfurt	Duisburg
14:00	Bajić 36'; Tunjić 69' (o.g.); Tsourakis 77'	Report	Göbel 24'; Engelhardt 89'	Stadium: MSV-Arena; Attendance: 11,136; Referee: Martin Petersen (Stuttgart)

22 February 2014 26	Borussia Dortmund II	2–0	MSV Duisburg	Dortmund
14:00	Treude 8'; Väyrynen 90+2'	Report		Stadium: Stadion Rote Erde; Attendance: 4,564; Referee: Florian Heft (Wietmarschen)

1 March 2014 27	MSV Duisburg	0–0	SV Wehen Wiesbaden	Duisburg
14:00		Report		Stadium: MSV-Arena; Attendance: 10,352; Referee: Sven Jablonski (Bremen)

7 March 2014 28	SV Darmstadt 98	1–0	MSV Duisburg	Darmstadt
19:00	Stroh-Engel 85' (pen.)	Report		Stadium: Stadion am Böllenfalltor; Attendance: 10,200; Referee: Wolfgang Stark (Ergolding)

15 March 2014 29	MSV Duisburg	1–1	Holstein Kiel	Duisburg
14:00	Onuegbu 44'	Report	Wetter 56'	Stadium: MSV-Arena; Attendance: 10,507; Referee: Markus Wingenbach (Mainz)

22 March 2014 30	F.C. Hansa Rostock	0–1	MSV Duisburg	Rostock
14:00		Report	Gardawski 12'	Stadium: DKB-Arena; Attendance: 7,800; Referee: Benjamin Brand (Gerolzhofen)

26 March 2014 31	MSV Duisburg	3–0	SV Elversberg	Duisburg
19:00	Öztürk 2'; Zoundi 67', 81'	Report		Stadium: MSV-Arena; Attendance: 9,106; Referee: Steffen Mix (Abtswind)

29 March 2014 32	1. FC Saarbrücken	0–2	MSV Duisburg	Saarbrücken
14:00		Report	Gardawski 27'; Bajić 80' (pen.)	Stadium: Ludwigsparkstadion; Attendance: 6,189; Referee: Florian Steinberg (Korntal-Münchingen)

4 April 2014 33	MSV Duisburg	0–0	VfB Stuttgart II	Duisburg
19:00		Report		Stadium: MSV-Arena; Attendance: 11,296; Referee: Marcel Göpferich (Bad Schönborn)

12 April 2014 34	Stuttgarter Kickers	2–0	MSV Duisburg	Stuttgart
14:00	Marchese 32' (pen.); Braun 84'	Report		Stadium: Gazi-Stadion auf der Waldau; Attendance: 4,150; Referee: Christian Dietz (Kronach)

19 April 2014 35	MSV Duisburg	1–0	VfL Osnabrück	Duisburg
14:00	Bajić 71'	Report		Stadium: MSV-Arena; Attendance: 13,102; Referee: Malte Dittrich (Bremen)

26 April 2014 36	Hallescher FC	1–1	MSV Duisburg	Halle
14:00	Ziegenbein 62'	Report	Bollmann 22'	Stadium: Erdgas Sportpark; Attendance: 6,904; Referee: Jonas Weickenmeier (Frankfurt)

3 May 2014 37	SpVgg Unterhaching	4–1	MSV Duisburg	Unterhaching
13:30	Haberer 7', 61' (pen.); Voglsammer 75', 78' (pen.)	Report	Onuegbu 56'	Stadium: Generali Sportpark; Attendance: 2,500; Referee: Florian Steinberg (Korntal-Münchingen)

10 May 2014 38	MSV Duisburg	0–1	Preußen Münster	Duisburg
13:30		Report	Bollmann 24' (o.g.)	Stadium: MSV-Arena; Attendance: 14,462; Referee: Arno Blos (Deizisau)

=== DFB-Pokal ===
5 August 2013 Round 1	MSV Duisburg	2–3	SC Paderborn	Duisburg
18:30	Gardawski 31'; Oršula 90+1'	Report	Brückner 37' ten Voorde 38'; Wemmer 80'	Stadium: Schauinsland-Reisen-Arena; Attendance: 17,191; Referee: Markus Wingenbach (Mainz)

=== Niederrheinpokal ===
21 August 2013 Round 1	TSV Krefeld-Bockum	0–4	MSV Duisburg	Krefeld
19:00		Report	Bollmann 42'; Onuegbu 61', 72'; Oršula 86'	Stadium: Grotenburg-Stadion; Attendance: 3,766; Referee: Dustin Sikorski (Kamp-Lintfort)

11 September 2013 Round 2	VfB Korschenbroich	0–5	MSV Duisburg	Duisburg
19:30		Report	Zoundi 7', 21'; Oršula 45'; Bollmann 56'; Rybacki 66'	Stadium: PCC-Stadion; Attendance: 2,600; Referee: Alexander Busse (Solingen)

16 October 2013 Round 3	TuS 64 Bösinghoven	0–3	MSV Duisburg	Duisburg
19:30		Report	de Wit 72'; Tsourakis 83'; Bollmann 90+1'	Stadium: PCC-Stadion; Attendance: 2,300; Referee: Christian Bandurski (Oberhausen)

26 November 2013 Quarterfinal	Cronenberger SC	0–5	MSV Duisburg	Wuppertal
19:00		Report	Onuegbu 10', 38', 69', 70'; Bajić 27'	Stadium: Stadion am Zoo; Attendance: 1,400; Referee: Benjamin Keck (Meerbusch)

8 April 2014 Semifinal	Rot-Weiss Essen	1–1 (a.e.t.) (0–3 p)	MSV Duisburg	Essen
19:30	Langlitz 94'	Report	de Wit 107'	Stadium: Stadion Essen; Attendance: 20,000; Referee: Guido Winkmann (Kerken)
	Penalties
	Dombrowka (penalty missed); Grund (penalty missed); Pires-Rodrigues (penalty missed)		(penalty scored) Bollmann; (penalty missed) Onuegbu; (penalty scored) de Wit; (penalty scored) Wolze

15 May 2014 Final	MSV Duisburg	5–2	TV Jahn Hiesfeld	Duisburg
18:30	Bollmann 50'; Bajić 55' (pen.); Gardawski 58'; Lekesiz 62'; Wolze 65'	Report	Hecht 48'; Rankl 79'	Stadium: MSV-Arena; Attendance: 24,002; Referee: Christian Bandurski (Oberhausen)

=== Friendlies ===
14 November 2013	TV Jahn Hiesfeld (Germany)	1–3	(Germany) MSV Duisburg	Dinslaken
19:00	Rankl 83'	Report	Lekesiz 10'; Tsourakis 18'; Rybacki 58'	Stadium: Dorotheen-Kampfbahn; Attendance: 517

14 January 2014	MSV Duisburg (Germany)	1–2	(Switzerland) FC Zürich	Side
15:00	Gardawski 7'	Report	Benito 2'; Sadiku 42'	Stadium: Hotel Starlight; Attendance: 60

17 January 2014	MSV Duisburg (Germany)	1–1	(Turkey) Konyaspor	Side
15:00	Tsourakis 42'	Report	Kabze 5'	Stadium: Hotel Starlight; Attendance: 60

21 January 2014	MSV Duisburg (Germany)	1–6	(Germany) Borussia Dortmund	Duisburg
19:30	Onuegbu 45'	Report	Aubameyang 8'; Lewandowski 16', 42'; Mkhitaryan 38', 40'; Schieber 68'	Stadium: MSV-Arena; Attendance: 24,355; Referee: Guido Winkmann (Kerken)

== Squad and statistics ==
=== Squad, matches played and goals scored ===
As of 15 May 2014

No.	Pos	Nat	Player	Total		3. Liga		DFB-Pokal		Niederrheinpokal	
No.	Pos	Nat	Player	Apps	Goals	Apps	Goals	Apps	Goals	Apps	Goals
1	GK	(Germany) GER	Michael Ratajczak	38	0	33	0	1	0	4	0
2	DF	(Germany) GER	Matthias Kühne	30	0	26	0	0	0	4	0
3	DF	(Germany) GER	Markus Bollmann	36	6	30	3	1	0	5	3
5	DF	(Bosnia and Herzegovina) BIH	Branimir Bajić	38	5	32	3	1	0	5	2
6	MF	(Germany) GER	Tanju Öztürk	37	1	32	1	1	0	4	0
7	MF	(Germany) GER	Sascha Dum	23	0	20	0	1	0	2	0
8	MF	(Germany) GER	Deniz Aycicek	24	2	21	2	0	0	3	0
9	MF	(Germany) GER	Pierre de Wit	39	4	35	2	1	0	3	2
10	FW	(Nigeria) NGR	Kingsley Onuegbu	43	20	37	14	1	0	5	6
11	MF	(Germany) GER	Michael Gardawski	31	5	27	3	1	1	3	1
14	DF	(Ghana) GHA	Phil Ofosu-Ayeh	38	1	33	1	1	0	4	0
15	FW	(Burkina Faso) BFA	Patrick Zoundi	38	7	33	5	0	0	5	2
16	FW	(Germany) GER	Gökhan Lekesiz	4	1	3	0	0	0	1	1
16	MF	(Germany) GER	Tarkan Yerek	1	0	0	0	0	0	1	0
17	MF	(Germany) GER	Kevin Wolze	35	5	30	4	1	0	4	1
18	DF	(Germany) GER	Maximilian Güll	16	0	11	0	1	0	4	0
19	DF	(Germany) GER	Tobias Feisthammel	28	1	24	1	1	0	3	0
21	FW	(Germany) GER	Erdoğan Yeşilyurt	16	2	13	1	0	0	3	1
22	GK	(Germany) GER	Maurice Schumacher	0	0	0	0	0	0	0	0
23	FW	(Germany) GER	Julien Rybacki	4	1	2	0	0	0	2	1
24	FW	(Germany) GER	Dominik Reinert	2	0	1	0	0	0	1	0
25	FW	(Slovakia) SVK	Filip Oršula	16	3	12	0	1	1	3	2
26	MF	(Germany) GER	Marcel Stenzel	1	0	0	0	0	0	1	0
27	DF	(Germany) GER	Babacar M'Bengue	6	0	3	0	0	0	3	0
28	MF	(Greece) GRE	Athanasios Tsourakis	26	3	20	2	1	0	5	1
30	GK	(Germany) GER	Marcel Lenz	8	0	6	0	0	0	2	0
31	MF	(Canada) CAN	Nikolas Ledgerwood	18	0	17	0	0	0	1	0
32	FW	(Germany) GER	Gerrit Wegkamp	17	0	15	0	0	0	2	0
33	DF	(Germany) GER	Christian Eichner	11	0	10	0	0	0	1	0

=== Discipline ===
N	Pos.	Nat.	Name	Yellow card	Second yellow card	Red card	Notes
1	GK	(Germany)	Michael Ratajczak	0	0	1	
2	DF	(Germany)	Matthias Kühne	8	0	0	
3	DF	(Germany)	Markus Bollmann	9	0	1	
5	DF	(Bosnia and Herzegovina)	Branimir Bajić	13	0	1	
6	MF	(Germany)	Tanju Öztürk	8	0	0	
7	MF	(Germany)	Sascha Dum	8	0	0	
8	MF	(Germany)	Deniz Aycicek	3	0	0	
9	MF	(Germany)	Pierre de Wit	5	0	0	
10	FW	(Nigeria)	Kingsley Onuegbu	1	0	0	
11	MF	(Germany)	Michael Gardawski	9	0	1	
14	DF	(Ghana)	Phil Ofosu-Ayeh	9	0	0	
15	FW	(Burkina Faso)	Patrick Zoundi	3	0	0	
16	MF	(Germany)	Tarkan Yerek	0	0	0	
16	MF	(Germany)	Gökhan Lekesiz	0	0	0	
17	MF	(Germany)	Kevin Wolze	9	0	1	
18	DF	(Germany)	Maximilian Güll	1	0	0	
19	MF	(Germany)	Tobias Feisthammel	4	1	0	
21	FW	(Germany)	Erdoğan Yeşilyurt	1	0	0	
22	GK	(Germany)	Maurice Schumacher	0	0	0	
23	FW	(Germany)	Julien Rybacki	0	0	0	
24	MF	(North Macedonia)	Dominik Reinert	0	0	0	
25	FW	(Slovakia)	Filip Oršula	0	0	0	
26	MF	(Germany)	Marcel Stenzel	0	0	0	
27	DF	(Germany)	Babacar M'Bengue	0	0	0	
28	FW	(Greece)	Athanasios Tsourakis	7	0	0	
30	GK	(Germany)	Marcel Lenz	0	0	0	
31	MF	(Canada)	Nikolas Ledgerwood	4	0	0	
32	FW	(Germany)	Gerrit Wegkamp	0	0	0	
33	DF	(Germany)	Christian Eichner	0	0	0	

Last updated: 15 May 2014
Source: kicker.de
Only competitive matches
(yellow card) = Number of bookings; (second yellow card) = Number of sending offs after a second yellow card; (red card) = Number of sending offs by a direct red card.

=== Squad ===
Note: Flags indicate national team as defined under FIFA eligibility rules; some limited exceptions apply. Players may hold more than one non-FIFA nationality.

No.	Pos.	Nation	Player
1	GK	GER	Michael Ratajczak
2	DF	GER	Matthias Kühne
3	DF	GER	Markus Bollmann
5	DF	BIH	Branimir Bajić (captain)
6	MF	GER	Tanju Öztürk
7	MF	GER	Sascha Dum
8	MF	GER	Deniz Aycicek
9	MF	GER	Pierre de Wit
10	FW	NGR	Kingsley Onuegbu
11	MF	GER	Michael Gardawski
14	DF	GHA	Phil Ofosu-Ayeh

No.	Pos.	Nation	Player
15	FW	BFA	Patrick Zoundi
17	MF	GER	Kevin Wolze
18	DF	GER	Maximilian Güll
19	DF	GER	Tobias Feisthammel
21	FW	GER	Erdoğan Yeşilyurt
22	GK	GER	Maurice Schumacher
23	FW	GER	Julien Rybacki
30	GK	GER	Marcel Lenz
31	MF	CAN	Nikolas Ledgerwood
32	FW	GER	Gerrit Wegkamp
33	DF	GER	Christian Eichner
