= 2014–15 Ergotelis F.C. season =

Ergotelis
2014–15 season
- Chairman: Giannis Daskalakis
- Manager: Giannis Taousianis
- Stadium: Pankritio Stadium, Heraklion
- Super League Greece: 15th
- Greek Cup: Second Round
- Top goalscorer: League: Mohamed Youssouf (6 goals); All: Mohamed Youssouf (6 goals)
- Highest home attendance: 6,143 vs Olympiacos (18 October 2014)
- Lowest home attendance: 769 vs Levadiakos (10 May 2015)
- Average home league attendance: 1,501
Home colours	Away colours	Third colours

The 2014–15 season was Ergotelis' 85th season in existence, 9th season in the Super League Greece, and the second consecutive season in the top tier since the club's latest promotion from the Football League. Ergotelis also participated in the Greek cup, entering the competition in the Second Round. After a turbulent season, with many managerial changes, player transfers, multiple matches being postponed in mid-season and competitors withdrawing from the league, Ergotelis was relegated after finishing in 16th place during the regular season. The club ultimately was placed in 15th place post-season, after Kerkyra was relegated for illegal transfer of shares. Kerkyra was given the last position of the league table, while Ergotelis' relegation status remained unchanged.

== Players ==
Summer acquisition
Winter acquisition

No.	Name	Nationality	Position (s)	Date of birth (age)	Signed from	Notes
Goalkeepers
13	Anastasios Daskalakis	(Greece)	GK	6 May 1995 (20)	Youth system	
31	Zacharias Kavousakis	(Greece)	GK	11 January 1989 (26)	Youth system	
50	Bojan Šaranov	(Serbia)	GK	22 September 1987 (27)	(Israel) Maccabi Haifa	
70	Ioannis Dermitzakis	(Greece)	GK	5 November 1992 (22)	Youth system	
Defenders
5	Borislav Jovanović	(Serbia)	CB	16 August 1986 (28)	(Serbia) Inđija	
25	Kaspars Gorkšs	(Latvia)	CB	6 November 1981 (33)	(England) Colchester United	
26	Cyriaque Louvion	(France)	CB	24 July 1987 (27)	Free agent	
3	Charalambos Lykogiannis	(Greece)	LB	22 October 1993 (21)	(Greece) Olympiacos	On loan
24	Minas Pitsos	(Greece)	LB	8 October 1980 (34)	(Greece) OFI	
17	Manolis Tzanakakis	(Greece)	RB	30 April 1992 (23)	(Greece) Olympiacos	On loan
Midfielders
15	Yann Boé-Kane	(France) (Senegal)	DM	5 April 1991 (24)	(France) Auxerre	
22	Chrysovalantis Kozoronis	(Greece)	DM	3 August 1992 (22)	Youth system	
33	Savvas Gentsoglou	(Greece)	DM	19 September 1990 (24)	(Italy) Sampdoria	
23	Leonardo Koutris	(Greece) (Brazil)	CM / LM	23 July 1995 (19)	Youth system	
11	Vasilios Rentzas	(Greece)	CM / RM	16 April 1992 (23)	(Greece) AEL	
20	Bruno Chalkiadakis	(Greece) (Brazil)	CM / RM	7 April 1993 (22)	Youth system	Suspension uplifted
8	Antonis Bourselis	(Greece)	AM	6 July 1994 (20)	(Greece) P.A.O. Krousonas	Loan return
10	Angelos Chanti	(Greece)	AM	7 September 1989 (25)	(Greece) Olympiakos Chersonissos	
19	Elton Calé	(Brazil)	AM / CF	12 July 1988 (26)	(Portugal) União Madeira	
77	Mohamed Youssouf	(Comoros) (France)	LM	26 March 1988 (27)	(France) Amiens	
16	Konstantinos Kaznaferis	(Greece)	RB / RW	22 June 1987 (27)	(Greece) Platanias	
88	Greg Houla	(France)	AM / RW	19 July 1988 (26)	(France) Les Chamois	
Forwards
91	Vladimir Đilas	(Serbia)	CF	3 March 1983 (32)	(Serbia) Radnički Niš	
93	Michael Olaitan	(Nigeria)	CF	1 January 1993 (22)	(Greece) Olympiacos	On loan
99	Nikola Stojanović	(Serbia)	CF	17 February 1995 (20)	(Serbia) Partizan	

=== The following players have departed in mid-season ===
28	Joris Sainati	(France)	CB	25 September 1988 (26)	(France) Istres	Contract terminated
18	Christos Kasapakis	(Greece)	DM	9 December 1993 (21)	(Greece) Panathinaikos	Contract terminated
27	Robert Kurež	(Slovenia)	CF	20 July 1991 (23)	(Slovenia) Aluminij	Contract terminated
9	Panagiotis Vlachodimos	(Greece) (Germany)	RW	12 October 1991 (23)	(Greece) Olympiacos	Loan terminated
1	Tomáš Černý	(Czech Republic)	GK	10 April 1985 (30)	(Bulgaria) CSKA Sofia	Contract Terminated
40	Rok Štraus	(Slovenia)	CM	3 March 1987 (28)	(Poland) Cracovia	Contract Terminated
6	Melli	(Spain)	CB / RB	6 June 1984 (30)	(Moldova) Sheriff Tiraspol	Contract Terminated
55	Aleksandar Nosković	(Serbia)	CF	12 December 1988 (26)	(Serbia) Spartak Subotica	Contract Terminated
2	Christos Chrysofakis	(Greece)	AM	18 January 1990 (25)	(Greece) Panegialios	Loan return, Contract Terminated
N/A	Mohamed Koné	(Ivory Coast)	RB	12 December 1993 (21)	(Ivory Coast) Africa Sports	Transfer Cancelled
12	Georgios Pamlidis	(Greece)	CF	13 November 1993 (21)	(Greece) Achilleas Neokaisareia	Loaned out
47	Marcos Bambam	(Brazil)	CF	19 March 1991 (24)	(Brazil) Grêmio B	Contract Terminated
42	Alan	(Brazil)	CM	9 December 1987 (27)	(Ukraine) Bukovyna	Out of team, released
32	Epaminondas Pantelakis	(Greece)	CB	10 February 1995 (20)	Youth system	Loaned out
90	Andriy Bohdanov	(Ukraine)	DM	21 January 1990 (25)	(Ukraine) Metalist Kharkiv	Out of team, released
29	Esteban Solari	(Argentina) (Italy)	CF	2 June 1980 (34)	Free agent	Released
39	Ignacio Fideleff	(Argentina) (Israel)	CB	4 July 1989 (25)	(Italy) Napoli	Loan return

Note: Flags indicate national team as has been defined under FIFA eligibility rules. Players and Managers may hold more than one non-FIFA nationality.

Head coach	Captain	Kit manufacturer	Shirt sponsor
(Greece) Giannis Taousianis	(Greece) Minas Pitsos	Eye Sportwear	Lotto

== Transfers ==
Winter Transfer Window

== In ==
Squad #	Position	Player	Transferred From	Fee	Date
N/A	DF	(Albania) (Greece) Albi Alla	(Greece) Fokikos	Loan return	1 July 2014
8	MF	(Greece) Antonis Bourselis	(Greece) P.A.O. Krousonas	Loan return	1 July 2014
2	MF	(Greece) Christos Chrysofakis	(Greece) Panegialios	Loan return	1 July 2014
N/A	MF	(Greece) Konstantinos Protogerakis	(Greece) P.O. Atsalenios	Loan return	1 July 2014
N/A	MF	(Brazil) Wellington Pessoa	(Greece) Panelefsiniakos	Loan return	1 July 2014
7	FW	(Greece) Giannis Domatas	(Greece) Asteras Magoula	Loan return	1 July 2014
N/A	MF	(Greece) Sokratis Evaggelou	(Greece) Ermis Zoniana	Loan return	1 July 2014
1	GK	(Czech Republic) Tomáš Černý	(Bulgaria) CSKA Sofia	Free	5 July 2014
6	DF	(Spain) Melli	(Moldova) Sheriff Tiraspol	Free	9 July 2014
77	MF	(Comoros) (France) Mohamed Youssouf	(France) Amiens	Free	14 July 2014
40	MF	(Slovenia) Rok Štraus	(Poland) Cracovia	Free	17 July 2014
16	MF	(Greece) Konstantinos Kaznaferis	(Greece) Platanias	Free	28 July 2014
17	DF	(Greece) Manolis Tzanakakis	(Greece) Olympiacos	Loan	1 August 2014
55	FW	(Serbia) Aleksandar Nosković	(Serbia) Spartak Subotica	Free	6 August 2014
90	MF	(Ukraine) Andriy Bohdanov	(Ukraine) Metalist Kharkiv	Free	7 August 2014
42	MF	(Brazil) Alan	(Ukraine) Bukovyna	Free	7 August 2014
3	DF	(Greece) Charalambos Lykogiannis	(Greece) Olympiacos	Loan	9 August 2014
28	DF	(France) Joris Sainati	(France) Istres	Free	11 August 2014
27	FW	(Slovenia) Robert Kurež	(Slovenia) Aluminij	Free	19 August 2014
12	FW	(Greece) Georgios Pamlidis	(Greece) Achilleas Neokaisareia	Free	19 August 2014
99	MF	(Serbia) Nikola Stojanović	(Serbia) Partizan	Free	19 August 2014
39	DF	(Argentina) (Israel) Ignacio Fideleff	(Italy) Napoli	Loan	21 August 2014
33	MF	(Greece) Savvas Gentsoglou	(Italy) Sampdoria	▼ Undisclosed Fee	29 August 2014
9	MF	(Greece) (Germany) Panagiotis Vlachodimos	(Greece) Olympiacos	Loan	4 September 2014
50	GK	(Serbia) Bojan Šaranov	(Israel) Maccabi Haifa	Free	30 December 2014
15	MF	(France) (Senegal) Yann Boé-Kane	(France) Auxerre	Free	8 January 2015
26	DF	(France) Cyriaque Louvion	Free agent	Free	9 January 2015
Ν/Α	DF	(Ivory Coast) Mohamed Koné	(Ivory Coast) Africa Sports	Free	10 January 2015
N/A	FW	(Greece) Giannis Domatas	(Greece) Giouchtas	Loan return	12 January 2015
19	MF	(Brazil) Elton Calé	(Portugal) União Madeira	Free	23 January 2015
88	MF	(France) Greg Houla	(France) Les Chamois	Free	24 January 2015
91	FW	(Serbia) Vladimir Đilas	(Serbia) Radnički Niš	Free	24 January 2015
93	FW	(Nigeria) Michael Olaitan	(Greece) Olympiacos	Loan	29 January 2015
25	DF	(Latvia) Kaspars Gorkšs	(England) Colchester United	Free	29 January 2015
N/A	MF	(Greece) Sokratis Evaggelou	(Greece) Chania	Loan return	1 February 2015
29	FW	(Argentina) (Italy) Esteban Solari	Free agent	Free	6 February 2015

=== Promoted from youth system ===
Squad #	Position	Player	Date	Signed Until
13	GK	(Greece) Anastasios Daskalakis	1 August 2014	30 June 2019

Total spending: ▼ Undisclosed

== Out ==
Position	Player	Transferred To	Fee	Date
GK	(Greece) Grigorios Athanasiou	(Cyprus) Ayia Napa	Free	5 June 2014
GK	(Serbia) Vladimir Stojković	(Israel) Maccabi Haifa	Free	10 June 2014
DF	(Spain) Álvaro Mejía	(Qatar) Al-Shahaniya	Free	18 June 2014
MF	(Slovakia) František Kubík	(Slovakia) Trenčín	Free	22 June 2014
DF	(Greece) Georgios Sarris	(Greece) AEK Athens	Free	1 July 2014
MF	(Brazil) Wellington Pessoa	(Brazil) Tiradentes-CE	Free	1 July 2014
DF	(Greece) Manolis Tzanakakis	(Greece) Olympiacos	Loan return	1 July 2014
MF	(Greece) Andreas Bouchalakis	(Greece) Olympiacos	Loan return	1 July 2014
MF	(Norway) Abdisalam Ibrahim	(Greece) Olympiacos	Loan return	1 July 2014
FW	(Greece) Dimitrios Diamantakos	(Greece) Olympiacos	Loan return	1 July 2014
FW	(Italy) Gaetano Monachello	(France) Monaco	Loan return	1 July 2014
DF	(Nigeria) Ayodele Adeleye	(Greece) OFI	Free	1 July 2014
DF	(Sierra Leone) (England) Aziz Deen-Conteh	Free agent	Free	1 July 2014
FW	(Greece) Ilias Anastasakos	(Greece) AEL	Free	1 July 2014
MF	(Argentina) (Italy) Horacio Cardozo	(Greece) Kerkyra	Free	1 July 2014
FW	(Greece) Michalis Kouiroukidis	(Greece) Asteras Vari	Free	1 July 2014
MF	(Belgium) (Burundi) Ziguy Badibanga	(Greece) Asteras Tripolis	Free	5 July 2014
MF	(Argentina) Diego Romano	(Greece) Iraklis	Free	17 July 2014
DF	(Albania) (Greece) Albi Alla	(Greece) Panachaiki	Loan	7 August 2014
MF	(Greece) Konstantinos Protogerakis	(Greece) Irodotos	Free	8 August 2014
FW	(Greece) Sokratis Evaggelou	(Greece) Chania	Loan	20 August 2014
DF	(Greece) Ioannis Kiliaras	(Greece) Irodotos	Released	5 September 2014
FW	(Greece) Giannis Domatas	(Greece) Giouchtas	Loan	18 September 2014
DF	(France) Joris Sainati	(France) Ajaccio	Free	12 November 2014
MF	(Greece) Christos Kasapakis	Free agent	Free	9 December 2014
FW	(Greece) (Germany) Panagiotis Vlachodimos	(Greece) Olympiacos	Loan return	11 December 2014
FW	(Slovenia) Robert Kurež	(Slovenia) Aluminij	Free	11 December 2014
GK	(Czech Republic) Tomáš Černý	(Scotland) Hibernian	Free	12 December 2014
MF	(Slovenia) Rok Štraus	(Poland) Widzew Łódź	Free	20 December 2014
DF	(Spain) Melli	(Azerbaijan) Simurq	Free	30 December 2014
FW	(Serbia) Aleksandar Nosković	Free agent	Free	30 December 2014
FW	(Greece) Giannis Domatas	(Greece) Ermionida	Free	12 January 2015
MF	(Greece) Christos Chrysofakis	(Greece) OF Ierapetra	Free	28 January 2015
DF	(Ivory Coast) Mohamed Koné	Free agent	Free	30 January 2015
FW	(Greece) Georgios Pamlidis	(Greece) AEL	Loan	30 January 2015
FW	(Brazil) Marcos Bambam	(Greece) Apollon Smyrnis	Free	31 January 2015
MF	(Brazil) Alan	Free agent	Free	2 February 2015
FW	(Greece) Sokratis Evaggelou	(Greece) Irodotos	Loan	5 February 2015
DF	(Greece) Epaminondas Pantelakis	(Greece) Fostiras	Loan	5 February 2015
DF	(Greece) Manolis Genitsaridis (U-20)	(Greece) Fostiras	Loan	5 February 2015
MF	(Ukraine) Andriy Bohdanov	Free agent	Free	11 February 2015
FW	(Argentina) (Italy) Esteban Solari	Free agent	Free	8 April 2015
DF	(Argentina) (Israel) Ignacio Fideleff	(Italy) Napoli	Loan return	20 April 2015

Total income: ▲0.00 €

Expenditure: ▼ Undisclosed

== Managerial changes ==
Outgoing manager	Manner of departure	Date of vacancy	Position in table	Incoming manager	Date of appointment
Vacant	Head coach appointment	--	--	(Spain) Juan Ferrando	3 July 2014
(Spain) Juan Ferrando	Sacked	1 September 2014	16th	(Greece) Pavlos Dermitzakis	5 September 2014
(Greece) Pavlos Dermitzakis	Sacked	15 December 2014	17th	(Greece) Giannis Taousianis	15 December 2014
(Greece) Giannis Taousianis	Mutual consent	12 February 2015	16th	(Greece) (Romania) Ioannis Matzourakis	12 February 2015
(Greece) (Romania) Ioannis Matzourakis	Resigned	25 February 2015	15th	(Greece) Giannis Taousianis	28 February 2015

== Pre-season and friendlies ==
=== Pre-season friendlies ===
Win Draw Loss

18 July 2014 Friendly	Ermis Aradippou (Cyprus)	3 – 1	(Greece) Ergotelis	Korakou, Nicosia, Cyprus
18:00	Araba 2'; Tagbajumi 60', 75'	Report	Youssouf 14'	Stadium: Korakou Stadium

21 July 2014 Friendly	APOEL (Cyprus)	2 – 0	(Greece) Ergotelis	Nicosia, Cyprus
20:30	De Vincenti 5', 38'	Report		Stadium: GSP Stadium

25 July 2014 Friendly	Doxa Katokopias (Cyprus)	1 – 1	(Greece) Ergotelis	Nicosia, Cyprus
18:00	González 42'	Report	Taousianis 72'	Stadium: Makario Stadium

6 August 2014 Friendly	Ergotelis (Greece)	2 – 0	(Greece) Irodotos	Heraklion, Crete, Greece
18:30	Rentzas 16'; Domatas 27'	Report		Stadium: Pankritio Stadium, Training Ground

9 August 2014 Friendly	Giouchtas (Greece)	2 – 3	(Greece) Ergotelis	Archanes, Heraklion, Crete, Greece
18:15	Iliopoulos 52'; Rovas 65'	Report	Chrysofakis 3'; Evaggelou 70'; Pamlidis 82'	Stadium: Archanes Municipal Stadium

10 August 2014 Friendly	Platanias (Greece)	1 – 1	(Greece) Ergotelis	Chania, Crete, Greece
19:00	Nazlidis 61'	Report	Rentzas 67'	Stadium: Perivolia Municipal Stadium

13 August 2014 Friendly	Ergotelis (Greece)	0 – 0	(Greece) P.A.O. Krousonas	Heraklion, Crete, Greece
18:30		Report		Stadium: Pankritio Stadium

17 August 2014 Friendly	Chania (Greece)	1 – 1	(Greece) Ergotelis	Chania, Crete, Greece
19:00	Pangalos 68' (pen.)	Report	Chanti 51'	Stadium: Perivolia Municipal Stadium

=== Mid-season friendlies ===
Win Draw Loss

6 September 2014 Friendly	Ergotelis (Greece)	1 – 0	(Greece) OFI	Heraklion, Crete, Greece
19:30	Kurež 83'	Report		Stadium: Pankritio Stadium

29 September 2014 Friendly	Ergotelis (Greece)	2 – 0	(Greece) Episkopi	Heraklion, Crete, Greece
17:00	Kurež 20', 50'	Report		Stadium: Pankritio Stadium, Training Ground

11 October 2014 Friendly	Ergotelis (Greece)	1 – 1	(Greece) Platanias	Heraklion, Crete, Greece
17:00	Nosković 44'	Report	Nazlidis 43'	Stadium: Pankritio Stadium

15 November 2014 Friendly	Platanias (Greece)	2 – 3	(Greece) Ergotelis	Chania, Crete, Greece
15:00	Torres 16'; Tsontakis 38'	Report	Youssouf 61'; Chanti 70'; Bambam 85' (pen.)	Stadium: Maleme Municipal Stadium

23 November 2014 Friendly	Irodotos (Greece)	3 – 1	(Greece) Ergotelis	Heraklion, Crete, Greece
15:00	Providakis 27'; Skoulas 44'; Kiliaras 48' (pen.)	Report	Pamlidis 52'	Stadium: Municipal Nea Alikarnassos Stadium

23 November 2014 Friendly	Ergotelis (Greece)	2 – 0	(Greece) Episkopi	Heraklion, Crete, Greece
18:00	Youssouf 50'; Stojanović 86'	Report		Stadium: Pankritio Stadium, Training Ground

27 February 2015 Friendly	OFI (Greece)	3 – 3	(Greece) Ergotelis	Heraklion, Crete, Greece
16:00	Martsakis 10', 38'; Perogamvrakis 16'	Report	Olaitan 27' (pen.), 42'; Rousakis 29' (o.g.)	Stadium: Theodoros Vardinogiannis Stadium

6 May 2015 Friendly	Ergotelis (Greece)	2 – 1	(Greece) Irodotos	Heraklion, Crete, Greece
18:00	Youssouf 48', 51'	Report	Kiliaras 35'	Stadium: Pankritio Stadium

== Competitions ==
=== Overview ===
Competition	Started round	Current position / round	Final position / round	First match	Last match
Super League Greece	1	15	15	25 August 2014	10 May 2015
Greek Football Cup	Second Round	Second Round	Second Round	24 September 2014	7 January 2015

Last updated: 2 July 2014

== League table ==
Pos	Team	Pld	W	D	L	GF	GA	GD	Pts	Qualification or relegation
13	Veria	34	12	7	15	45	54	−9	43 (Note: Head-to-head points: Panthrakikos 11, Panionios 10, Veria 8, Levadiakos 4.)	
14	Levadiakos	34	12	7	15	41	34	+7	43	
15	Ergotelis (R)	34	8	8	18	35	60	−25	32	Relegation to Football League
16	OFI (Note: OFI were deducted 29 points in total. From those, 10 points due to failure to pay over former players' wages.) (R)	34	7	2	25	26	72	−46	−6 (Note: Head-to-head points: OFI 3, Niki Volos 0.)	Relegation to Gamma Ethniki
17	Niki Volos (Note: Niki Volos were deducted 13 points and have been disqualified from the League due to financial issues.) (R)	34	2	1	31	7	84	−77	−6	Relegation to Gamma Ethniki

Source: Super League Greece
Rules for classification: 1) Points; 2) Head-to-head goal difference; 3) Head-to-head points; 4) Goals scored; 5) Play-offs (neutral ground).
(Note: Criteria 5 is only used if needed to decide champion, teams for relegation or teams for UEFA competitions). In any other case, the final standings of tied teams are determined with a public draw.
(R) Relegated

== Results summary ==
Overall								Home						Away					
Pld	W	D	L	GF	GA	GD	Pts	W	D	L	GF	GA	GD	W	D	L	GF	GA	GD
34	8	8	18	35	60	−25	32	4	4	9	22	33	−11	4	4	9	13	27	−14

Last updated: 29 September 2014.
Source: Competitive matches

=== Matches ===
Win Draw Loss Postponed

25 August 2014 1	Panionios	2 – 1	Ergotelis	Nea Smyrni, Athens, Greece
21:30	Giannou 15', 85'	Report	Melli 16'	Stadium: Nea Smyrni Stadium; Attendance: 638; Referee: Athanasios Giachos

30 August 2014 2	AEL Kalloni	2 – 0	Ergotelis	Mytilene, Greece
19:15	Kaltsas 43'; Llorente 89'	Report		Stadium: Mytilene Municipal Stadium; Attendance: 1,856; Referee: Praxitelis Zachariadis

15 September 2014 3	Ergotelis	0 – 3	Platanias	Heraklion, Crete, Greece
19:30		Report	Tsourakis 6'; Gomes 48'; Torres 90+2'	Stadium: Pankritio Stadium; Attendance: 1,239; Referee: Stefanos Mantakis

21 September 2014 4	Niki Volos	1 – 4	Ergotelis	Volos, Greece
18:15	Ivens 20'	Report	Bohdanov 12'; Nosković 46'; Chalkiadakis 53'; Youssouf 79'	Stadium: Panthessaliko Stadium; Attendance: 1,538; Referee: Andreas Pappas

28 September 2014 5	Ergotelis	1 – 1	Panetolikos	Heraklion, Crete, Greece
18:15	Lykogiannis 60'	Report	Moreno 24'	Stadium: Pankritio Stadium; Attendance: 1,062; Referee: Konstantinos Ioannidis

18 October 2014 7	Ergotelis	2 – 3	Olympiacos	Heraklion, Crete, Greece
20:30	Youssouf 43'; Chanti 55'	Report	Mitroglou 45', 90'; Domínguez 68' (pen.)	Stadium: Pankritio Stadium; Attendance: 6,143; Referee: Aristomenis Koutsiaftis

25 October 2014 8	Atromitos	1 – 1	Ergotelis	Peristeri, Athens, Greece
19:30	Lazaridis 51'	Report	Chalkiadakis 78'	Stadium: Peristeri Stadium; Attendance: 1,027; Referee: Marios Labropoulos

2 November 2014 9	Ergotelis	0 – 2	PAOK	Heraklion, Crete, Greece
15:00		Report	Athanasiadis 42', 90+6'	Stadium: Pankritio Stadium; Attendance: 1,425; Referee: Alexandros Dimitropoulos

8 November 2014 10	Ergotelis	2 – 2	Veria	Heraklion, Crete, Greece
15:00	Chalkiadakis 13'; Youssouf 38'	Report	Kaltsas 17'; Ben Nabouhane 61' (pen.)	Stadium: Pankritio Stadium; Attendance: 977; Referee: Georgios Liachoudis

30 November 2014 12	Ergotelis	1 – 4	Asteras Tripolis	Heraklion, Crete, Greece
17:15	Jovanović 27'	Report	Barrales 22' (pen.); Fernández 48'; Gianniotas 51'; Parra 89'	Stadium: Pankritio Stadium; Attendance: 1,046; Referee: Praxitelis Zachariadis

4 December 2014 6^{1}	OFI	1 – 0	Ergotelis	Heraklion, Crete, Greece
19:30	Milhazes 90+7' (pen.)	Report		Stadium: Theodoros Vardinogiannis Stadium; Attendance: 3,850; Referee: Apostolos Amparkiolis

8 December 2014 13	Panthrakikos	0 – 0	Ergotelis	Komotini, Greece
19:30		Report		Stadium: Komotini Municipal Stadium; Attendance: 1,046; Referee: Andreas Pappas

14 December 2014 14	Ergotelis	0 – 2	Skoda Xanthi	Heraklion
17:15		Report	Lisgaras 45'; Obodo 71'	Stadium: Pankritio Stadium; Attendance: 1,315; Referee: Aristomenis Koutsiaftis

17 December 2014 15	Kerkyra	3 – 1	Ergotelis	Kerkyra, Greece
15:00	Kajkut 52', 67'; Markovski 63'	Report	Fideleff 38'	Stadium: Kerkyra Stadium; Attendance: 877; Referee: Athanasios Giachos

21 December 2014 16	Ergotelis	1 – 0	PAS Giannina	Heraklion, Crete, Greece
17:15	Youssouf 9'	Report		Stadium: Pankritio Stadium; Attendance: 1,293; Referee: Anastasios Sidiropoulos

4 January 2015 17	Levadiakos	1 – 1	Ergotelis	Levadia, Greece
17:15	Sotelo 7'	Report	Youssouf 10'	Stadium: Levadia Municipal Stadium; Attendance: 666; Referee: Stavros Mantalos

11 January 2015 11^{2}	Panathinaikos	5 – 0	Ergotelis	Athens, Greece
17:15	Klonaridis 8'; Berg 12', 15', 42'; Tavlaridis 23'	Report		Stadium: Leoforos Alexandras Stadium; Attendance: 8,038; Referee: Stefanos Mantakis

19 January 2015 19	Ergotelis	3 – 3	AEL Kalloni	Heraklion, Crete, Greece
19:30	Chanti 67', 73'; Kozoronis 90+3'	Report	Leozinho 20' (pen.); Juanma 39'; Mingas 85'	Stadium: Pankritio Stadium; Attendance: 1,148; Referee: Konstantinos Ioannidis

26 January 2015 20	Platanias	1 – 2	Ergotelis	Chania, Crete, Greece
19:30	Goundoulakis 1'	Report	Calé 77'; Youssouf 86'	Stadium: Perivolia Municipal Stadium; Attendance: 1,162; Referee: Anastasios Sidiropoulos

– 21^{3}	Ergotelis	3 – 0 ((w/o))	Niki Volos	–
–				Stadium: – Attendance: – Referee: –

4 February 2015 22	Panetolikos	4 – 0	Ergotelis	Agrinio, Greece
15:00	Fotakis 19'; Alves 42', 90+3'; Kappel 63'	Report		Stadium: Panetolikos Stadium; Attendance: 2,379; Referee: Praxitelis Zachariadis

7 February 2015 23	Ergotelis	3 – 2	OFI	Heraklion, Crete, Greece
17:15	Boé-Kane 23'; Đilas 31'; Gorkšs 36'	Report	Makris 32'; Merebashvili 68'	Stadium: Pankritio Stadium; Attendance: 1,716; Referee: Stavros Tritsonis

14 February 2015 24	Olympiacos	3 – 0	Ergotelis	Pireus, Greece
19:30	Durmaz 71'; Fortounis 73', 90+3'	Report		Stadium: Georgios Karaiskakis Stadium; Attendance: 12,812; Referee: Anastasios Papapetrou

18 February 2015 18^{4}	Ergotelis	2 – 2	Panionios	Heraklion, Crete, Greece
17:15	Houla 38' (pen.); Olaitan 73'	Report	Tzanakakis 5' (o.g.); Fountas 29'	Stadium: Theodoros Vardinogiannis Stadium^{5} Attendance: 978; Referee: Christos Mitsios

23 February 2015 25	Ergotelis	1 – 2	Atromitos	Heraklion, Crete, Greece
17:15	Solari 18' (pen.)	Report	Napoleoni 31'; Marcelinho 86'	Stadium: Theodoros Vardinogiannis Stadium^{5} Attendance: 1,118; Referee: Georgios Kominis

7 March 2015 27	Veria	0 – 1	Ergotelis	Veria, Greece
15:00		Report	Gorkšs 14'	Stadium: Veria Stadium; Attendance: Behind closed doors Referee: Georgios Liachoudis

14 March 2015 28	Ergotelis	0 – 2	Panathinaikos	Heraklion, Crete, Greece
15:00		Report	Berg 31'; Ajagun 40'	Stadium: Pankritio Stadium; Attendance: Behind closed doors Referee: Athanasios Giachos

18 March 2015 26^{6}	PAOK	1 – 0	Ergotelis	Thessaloniki, Greece
17:15	Papadopoulos 83'	Report		Stadium: Toumba Stadium; Attendance: 3,574; Referee: Georgios Kominis

22 March 2015 29	Asteras Tripolis	2 – 1	Ergotelis	Tripoli, Greece
17:15	Kourbelis 9'; Barrales 45+1' (pen.)	Report	Zisopoulos 90+1' (o.g.)	Stadium: Theodoros Kolokotronis Stadium; Attendance: 1,344; Referee: Praxitelis Zachariadis

5 April 2015 30	Ergotelis	2 – 1	Panthrakikos	Heraklion, Crete, Greece
17:15	Chalkiadakis 22'; Đilas 84'	Report	Mejía 67'	Stadium: Pankritio Stadium; Attendance: 997; Referee: Stavros Mantalos

18 April 2015 31	Skoda Xanthi	0 – 1	Ergotelis	Xanthi
17:15		Report	Đilas 66' (pen.)	Stadium: Skoda Xanthi Arena; Attendance: 1,091; Referee: Anastasios Sidiropoulos

27 April 2015 32	Ergotelis	1 – 2	Kerkyra	Heraklion, Crete, Greece
19:30	Chalkiadakis 57'	Report	Dimitrovski 74'; Kontos 78'	Stadium: Pankritio Stadium; Attendance: 1,292; Referee: Georgios Kominis

3 May 2015 33	PAS Giannina	0 – 0	Ergotelis	Ioannina, Greece
19:00		Report		Stadium: Zosimades Stadium; Attendance: 1,456; Referee: Georgios Daskalopoulos

10 May 2015 34	Ergotelis	0 – 2	Levadiakos	Heraklion, Crete, Greece
19:00		Report	Milosavljev 66'; Mantzios 68'	Stadium: Pankritio Stadium; Attendance: 769; Referee: Alexandros Aretopoulos

1. Matchday 6 vs. OFI, originally meant to be held October 4, 2014, was postponed until December 4, 2014 via a direct decision of the Deputy Minister of Culture and Sport, Giannis Andrianos in response to the murder of Ethnikos Piraeus fan Kostas Katsoulis in the municipal Nea Alikarnassos Stadium during the Football League 2 match vs. Irodotos.
2. Matchday 11 vs. Panathinaikos, originally meant to be held November 23, 2014, was postponed until January 11, 2015 after the Hellenic Football Federation decided not to appoint referees for all domestic league and cup matches in response to a violent attack versus its member Christoforos Zografos.
3. Matchday 21 vs. Niki Volos, originally meant to be held February 1, 2015, was awarded to Ergotelis (3-0), due to Niki Volos withdrawing from the league.
4. Matchday 18 vs. Panionios, originally meant to be held January 14, 2015, was postponed until February 18, 2015 due to safety regulations, after the Pankritio Stadium suffered severe damages due to extreme weather conditions in Heraklion.
5. After a second wave of severe weather conditions in Heraklion, which caused more damage to the Pankritio Stadium's awning, the Home games vs. Panionios (18-02-2015) and Atromitos (23-02-2015) were held at the local Theodoros Vardinogiannis Stadium.
6. Matchday 26 vs. PAOK, originally meant to be held February 28, 2015, was postponed via a direct decision of the Deputy Minister of Culture and Sport, Stavros Kontonis after a violent outbreak of fans at Leoforos Alexandras Stadium during the derby of the eternal enemies.

== Greek Cup ==
=== Second round ===
==== Group F ====
Pos	Team	Pld	W	D	L	GF	GA	GD	Pts	Qualification	VER	APS	ERM	ERG
1	Veria	3	2	1	0	7	2	+5	7	Round of 16		1–1	4–1	—
2	Apollon Smyrnis	3	1	2	0	4	3	+1	5	Round of 16	—		—	2–2
3	Ermionida	3	1	0	2	3	5	−2	3		—	0–1		2–0
4	Ergotelis	3	0	1	2	2	6	−4	1		0–2	—	—	

Source: epo.gr

==== Matches ====
Win Draw Loss

24 September 2014	Apollon Smyrnis	2 – 2	Ergotelis	Rizoupoli, Athens, Greece
16:30	Kotsonis 57'; Angulo 70'	Report	Koutris 36'; Kozoronis 90+3'	Stadium: Georgios Kamaras Stadium; Attendance: N/A; Referee: Georgios Daskalopoulos

29 October 2014	Ergotelis	0 – 2	Veria	Heraklion, Crete, Greece
15:00		Report	Vergonis 10'; Bargan 65'	Stadium: Pankritio Stadium; Attendance: N/A; Referee: Konstantinos Ioannidis

7 January 2015	Ermionida	2 – 0	Ergotelis	Kranidi, Argolis, Greece
15:00	Staikos 4'; Koutsospyros 37'	Report		Stadium: Municipal Kranidi Stadium; Attendance: Ν/Α; Referee: Ilias Spathas

== Statistics ==
Player has departed in mid-season

=== Goal scorers ===
No.	Pos.	Nation	Name	Super League Greece	Greek Cup	Total
77	MF	(Comoros) (France)	Mohamed Youssouf	6	0	6
20	MF	(Greece) (Brazil)	Bruno Chalkiadakis	5	0	5
10	MF	(Greece)	Angelos Chanti	3	0	3
91	FW	(Serbia)	Vladimir Đilas	3	0	3
25	DF	(Latvia)	Kaspars Gorkšs	2	0	2
22	MF	(Greece)	Chrysovalantis Kozoronis	1	1	2
15	MF	(France) (Senegal)	Yann Boé-Kane	1	0	1
90	MF	(Ukraine)	Andriy Bohdanov	1	0	1
19	MF	(Brazil)	Elton Calé	1	0	1
39	DF	(Argentina) (Israel)	Ignacio Fideleff	1	0	1
88	MF	(France)	Greg Houla	1	0	1
5	DF	(Serbia)	Borislav Jovanović	1	0	1
3	DF	(Greece)	Charalambos Lykogiannis	1	0	1
6	DF	(Spain)	Melli	1	0	1
55	FW	(Serbia)	Aleksandar Nosković	1	0	1
93	FW	(Nigeria)	Michael Olaitan	1	0	1
29	FW	(Argentina) (Italy)	Esteban Solari	1	0	1
23	MF	(Greece) (Brazil)	Leonardo Koutris	0	1	1
-	-	-	Awarded (w/o)	3	0	3
-	-	-	Opponent's own Goals	1	0	1
TOTAL				35	2	37

Last updated: 22 September 2014
