= 2011–12 MSV Duisburg season =

MSV Duisburg
2011–12 season
- Chairman: Andreas Rüttgers
- Manager: Oliver Reck
- 2. Fußball-Bundesliga: 10th place
- DFB-Pokal: Round 2
Home colours	Away colours	Third colours

The 2011–12 season was MSV Duisburg's 112th season and their 4th season in the 2. Bundesliga after failing to be promoted. They reached the 2010–11 DFB-Pokal final last year.

On October 27, the club sacked coach Milan Šašić. Oliver Reck took over.

== Info ==
- Manager: Oliver Reck
- League: 2. Bundesliga
- Shirt sponsor: Rheinpower
- Average league attendance: 13,461
- League: 10th place
- German Cup: Eliminated in second round
- League top goal scorer: Branimir Bajić (6 goals)

== Current squad ==
As of 16 January 2011 Note: Flags indicate national team as defined under FIFA eligibility rules; some limited exceptions apply. Players may hold more than one non-FIFA nationality.

No.	Pos.	Nation	Player
1	GK	PHI	Roland Müller
2	MF	GRE	Vasileios Pliatsikas (on loan from Schalke 04)
3	DF	GER	Markus Bollmann
4	DF	BIH	Džemal Berberović
5	DF	GER	Daniel Reiche
6	MF	GER	Benjamin Kern
7	MF	GER	Daniel Brosinski
8	FW	GER	Maurice Exslager
9	FW	BUL	Valeri Domovchiyski
10	MF	GER	Jürgen Gjasula
11	FW	SRB	Srđan Baljak (captain)
13	DF	KAZ	Sergei Karimov
14	DF	BRA	Bruno Soares
15	MF	SLO	Goran Šukalo

No.	Pos.	Nation	Player
17	MF	GER	Kevin Wolze
18	GK	GER	Felix Wiedwald
19	MF	CRO	Zvonko Pamić (on loan from Bayer 04 Leverkusen)
21	DF	GER	André Hoffmann
22	MF	HUN	János Lázok
23	GK	GER	Florian Fromlowitz
25	DF	BIH	Branimir Bajić (vice captain)
26	MF	GER	Tanju Öztürk
27	FW	ROU	Emil Jula
28	MF	BIH	Dušan Jevtić
29	MF	TUR	Burakcan Kunt
30	GK	GER	Marcel Lenz
32	FW	NOR	Flamur Kastrati
33	FW	POL	Tomasz Zahorski

=== Transfers ===
In:

No.	Pos.	Nation	Player
2	MF	GRE	Vasileios Pliatsikas (on loan from FC Schalke 04)
3	DF	GER	Markus Bollmann (from Arminia Bielefeld)
4	DF	BIH	Džemal Berberović (from PFC Litex Lovech)
7	MF	GER	Daniel Brosinski (from Wehen Wiesbaden)
9	FW	BUL	Valeri Domovchiyski (from Hertha BSC)
10	MF	GER	Jürgen Gjasula (from FSV Frankfurt)
12	DF	GER	Stephen Hennen (from MSV Duisburg II)
13	DF	KAZ	Sergei Karimov (from VfL Wolfsburg)
17	MF	GER	Kevin Wolze (from VfL Wolfsburg)
18	GK	GER	Felix Wiedwald (from Werder Bremen)
23	GK	GER	Florian Fromlowitz (from Hannover 96)
27	FW	ROU	Emil Jula (from Energie Cottbus)
28	MF	AUT	Daniel Beichler (on loan from Hertha BSC, previously on loan at FC St. Gallen)
28	MF	BIH	Dušan Jevtić (from TSV 1860 München II)
32	FW	NOR	Flamur Kastrati (from FC Twente, previously on loan at VfL Osnabrück)
33	MF	CHN	Shao Jiayi (from Energie Cottbus)
33	FW	POL	Tomasz Zahorski (from Górnik Zabrze)

Out:

No.	Pos.	Nation	Player
1	GK	SUI	Marcel Herzog (released)
2	DF	GER	Julian Koch (loan return to Borussia Dortmund)
4	MF	CRO	Ivica Banović (loan return to SC Freiburg)
10	MF	CZE	Filip Trojan (loan return to 1. FSV Mainz 05)
11	MF	TUR	Olcay Şahan (to 1. FC Kaiserslautern)
18	GK	USA	David Yelldell (to Bayer 04 Leverkusen)
19	FW	AUT	Stefan Maierhofer (loan return to Wolverhampton Wanderers)
20	MF	BIH	Ivica Grlić (retired)
21	MF	GER	Michael Blum (to Hansa Rostock, previously on loan)
22	FW	GER	Manuel Schäffler (loan return to 1860 Munich)
24	MF	GER	Kevin Grund (to Rot-Weiss Essen)
26	MF	GER	Yannick Stark (to FSV Frankfurt, previously on loan at SV Darmstadt 98)
28	DF	FRA	Olivier Veigneau (released)
32	MF	GER	Sefa Yilmaz (to Kayserispor)

== League table ==
Pos	Team	Pld	W	D	L	GF	GA	GD	Pts
8	Eintracht Braunschweig	34	10	15	9	37	35	+2	45
9	Dynamo Dresden	34	12	9	13	50	52	−2	45
10	MSV Duisburg	34	10	9	15	42	47	−5	39
11	VfL Bochum	34	10	7	17	41	55	−14	37
12	FC Ingolstadt	34	8	13	13	43	58	−15	37

Source: kicker
Rules for classification: 1) points; 2) goal difference; 3) number of goals scored.

== Results ==
=== League matches ===
17 July 2011 2. Bundesliga (Day 1)	Karlsruher SC	3–2	MSV Duisburg	Wildparkstadion, Karlsruhe
15:30 CET	Iashvili 5'; Lavrič 6'; Staffeldt 22'	Report	Wolze 1', 44'	Attendance: 17,087; Referee: Tobias Welz

22 July 2011 2. Bundesliga (Day 2)	MSV Duisburg	1–2	Energie Cottbus	Schauinsland-Reisen-Arena, Duisburg
20:30	Shao 16'	Report	Rangelov 6'; Bittencourt 10'	Attendance: 15,017; Referee: Günter Perl

7 August 2011 2. Bundesliga (Day 3)	FSV Frankfurt	0–0	MSV Duisburg	Frankfurter Volksbank Stadion, Frankfurt
13:30		Report		Attendance: 4,132; Referee: Robert Kampka

14 August 2011 2. Bundesliga (Day 4)	MSV Duisburg	0–0	Hansa Rostock	Schauinsland-Reisen-Arena, Duisburg
13:30		Report		Attendance: 13,777; Referee: Patrick Ittrich

22 August 2011 2. Bundesliga (Day 5)	FC St. Pauli	2–1	MSV Duisburg	Millerntor-Stadion, Hamburg
20:15	Schindler 33'; Bartels 90+3'	Report	Bajić 38'	Attendance: 24,500; Referee: Christian Dingert

26 August 2011 2. Bundesliga (Day 6)	MSV Duisburg	3–0	Dynamo Dresden	Schauinsland-Reisen-Arena, Duisburg
18:00	Bajić 44'; Jula 79'; Gueye 90' (o.g.)	Report		Attendance: 12,657; Referee: Benjamin Cortus

9 September 2011 2. Bundesliga (Day 7)	SpVgg Greuther Fürth	2–1	MSV Duisburg	Trolli Arena, Fürth
18:00	Fürstner 58'; Nöthe 64'	Report	Gjasula 66'	Attendance: 9,030; Referee: Bibiana Steinhaus

17 September 2011 2. Bundesliga (Day 8)	MSV Duisburg	1–1	Union Berlin	Schauinsland-Reisen-Arena, Duisburg
13:00	Jula 82' (pen.)	Report	Mosquera 5'	Attendance: 11,347; Referee: Harm Osmers

25 September 2011 2. Bundesliga (Day 9)	VfL Bochum	2–1	MSV Duisburg	Ruhrstadion, Bochum
13:30	Dabrowski 17'; Ginczek 89'	Report	Bajić 53'	Attendance: 13,227; Referee: Jochen Drees

2 October 2. Bundesliga (Day 10)	MSV Duisburg	0–1	SC Paderborn	Schauinsland-Reisen-Arena, Duisburg
13:30		Report	Proschwitz 77'	Attendance: 11,327; Referee: Marco Fritz

15 October 2. Bundesliga (Day 11)	MSV Duisburg	3–1	FC Ingolstadt	Schauinsland-Reisen-Arena, Duisburg
13:00	Berberović 49'; Bajić 63'; Pliatsikas 82'	Report	Hartmann 10'	Attendance: 9,547; Referee: Daniel Siebert

23 October 2. Bundesliga (Day 12)	Eintracht Frankfurt	3–0	MSV Duisburg	Commerzbank-Arena, Frankfurt
13:30	Hoffer 35', 53'; Meier 65'	Report		Attendance: 39,900; Referee: Markus Schmidt

30 October 2. Bundesliga (Day 13)	MSV Duisburg	0–3	1860 Munich	Schauinsland-Reisen-Arena, Duisburg
13:30		Report	Bierofka 4'; Kaiser 67'; Volland 82'	Attendance: 11,387; Referee: Marcel Unger

6 November 2. Bundesliga (Day 14)	Alemannia Aachen	2–2	MSV Duisburg	New Tivoli, Aachen
13:30	Radu 5'; Bajić 68' (o.g.)	Report	Domovchiyski 29'; Hoffmann 67'	Attendance: 31,180; Referee: Peter Sippel

18 November 2. Bundesliga (Day 15)	MSV Duisburg	3–0	Eintracht Braunschweig	Schauinsland-Reisen-Arena, Duisburg
18:00	Brosinski 11', 32'; Pamić 85'	Report		Attendance: 11,237; Referee: Manuel Gräfe

25 November 2. Bundesliga (Day 16)	Erzgebirge Aue	1–2	MSV Duisburg	Erzgebirgsstadion, Aue
18:00	Höfler 21'	Report	Brosinski 14'; Exslager 90+1'	Attendance: 7,300; Referee: Markus Schmidt

5 December 2. Bundesliga (Day 17)	MSV Duisburg	0–2	Fortuna Düsseldorf	Schauinsland-Reisen-Arena, Duisburg
20:15		Report	Langeneke 57'; Rösler 59'	Attendance: 23,117; Referee: Günter Perl

9 December 2. Bundesliga (Day 18)	MSV Duisburg	3–1	Karlsruher SC	Schauinsland-Reisen-Arena, Duisburg
18:00	Šukalo 3'; Jula 57'; Brosinski 70'	Report	Müller 59'	Attendance: 9,147; Referee: Thomas Metzen

18 December 2. Bundesliga (Day 19)	Energie Cottbus	1–1	MSV Duisburg	Stadion der Freundschaft, Cottbus
13:30	Kruska 34'	Report	Bajić 75'	Attendance: 7,500; Referee: Tobias Stieler

3 February 2. Bundesliga (Day 20)	MSV Duisburg	1–2	FSV Frankfurt	Schauinsland-Reisen-Arena, Duisburg
18:00	Šukalo 47'	Report	Mitsanski 18', 69'	Attendance: 9,577; Referee: Marcel Unger

12 February 2. Bundesliga (Day 21)	Hansa Rostock	4–2	MSV Duisburg	DKB-Arena, Rostock
13:30	Mintal 30', 52'; Jänicke 36'; Borg 82' (pen.)	Report	Bajić 34'; Šukalo 40'	Attendance: 9,200; Referee: Benjamin Cortus

17 February 2. Bundesliga (Day 22)	MSV Duisburg	0–1	FC St. Pauli	Schauinsland-Reisen-Arena, Duisburg
18:00		Report	Boll 21'	Attendance: 15,117; Referee: Robert Hartmann

24 February 2. Bundesliga (Day 23)	Dynamo Dresden	2–0	MSV Duisburg	Glücksgas-Stadion, Dresden
18:00	Fořt 57'; Dedič 59'	Report		Attendance: 21,500; Referee: Harm Osmers

2 March 2. Bundesliga (Day 24)	MSV Duisburg	0–2	SpVgg Greuther Fürth	Schauinsland-Reisen-Arena, Duisburg
18:00		Report	Occean 78'; Zillner 90+1'	Attendance: 10,077; Referee: Christian Dingert

9 March 2. Bundesliga (Day 25)	Union Berlin	1–1	MSV Duisburg	Stadion an der Alten Försterei, Berlin
18:00	Terodde 90+1'	Report	Exslager 62'	Attendance: 15,076; Referee: Frank Willenborg

18 March 2. Bundesliga (Day 26)	MSV Duisburg	2–1	VfL Bochum	Schauinsland-Reisen-Arena, Duisburg
13:30	Gelashvili 25' (o.g.); Exslager 78'	Report	Inui 19'	Attendance: 15,727; Referee: Robert Kampka

25 March 2. Bundesliga (Day 27)	SC Paderborn	1–2	MSV Duisburg	Energieteam Arena, Paderborn
13:30	Brückner 51'	Report	Wolze 11'; Domovchiyski 68'	Attendance: 12,178; Referee: Thorsten Schriever

1 April 2. Bundesliga (Day 28)	FC Ingolstadt	1–1	MSV Duisburg	Audi Sportpark, Ingolstadt
13:30	Schäffler 83'	Report	Soares 54'	Attendance: 7,308; Referee: Robert Kempter

7 April 2. Bundesliga (Day 29)	MSV Duisburg	2–0	Eintracht Frankfurt	Schauinsland-Reisen-Arena, Duisburg
13:00	Šukalo 44'; Soares 52'	Report		Attendance: 19,027; Referee: Florian Steuer

11 April 2. Bundesliga (Day 30)	1860 Munich	2–1	MSV Duisburg	Allianz Arena, Munich
17:30	Vallori 58'; Lauth 71'	Report	Jula 69'	Attendance: 14,400; Referee: Martin Petersen

14 April 2. Bundesliga (Day 31)	MSV Duisburg	2–0	Alemannia Aachen	Schauinsland-Reisen-Arena, Duisburg
13:00	Brosinski 74'; Gjasula 83'	Report		Attendance: 15,127; Referee: Wolfgang Stark

20 April 2. Bundesliga (Day 32)	Eintracht Braunschweig	0–0	MSV Duisburg	Eintracht-Stadion, Braunschweig
18:00		Report		Attendance: 19,825; Referee: Norbert Grudzinski

29 April 2. Bundesliga (Day 33)	MSV Duisburg	2–1	Erzgebirge Aue	Schauinsland-Reisen-Arena, Duisburg
13:30	Šukalo 18'; Wolze 23'	Report	König 56'	Attendance: 15,627; Referee: Marco Fritz

18 May 2. Bundesliga (Day 34)	Fortuna Düsseldorf	2–2	MSV Duisburg	Esprit Arena, Düsseldorf
13:30	Fink 18'; Lukimya 21'	Report	Exslager 8'; Gjasula 27'	Attendance: 51,000; Referee: Knut Kircher

Source: Kicker

=== DFB-Pokal matches ===
30 July 2011	SV Babelsberg 03	0–2	MSV Duisburg	Karl-Liebknecht-Stadion, Potsdam
15:30 CET		Report	Stroh-Engel 5' (o.g.); Domovchiyski 30'	Attendance: 3,256; Referee: Martin Petersen

26 October 2011	Holstein Kiel	2–0	MSV Duisburg	Holstein-Stadion, Kiel
19:00	Kazior 54'; Sykora 58'	Report		Attendance: 8,981; Referee: Christian Fischer

Source: Kicker

=== Preseason matches ===
16 June 2011	Auswahl Südtirol (Austria)	1–7	(Germany) MSV Duisburg
19:00 CEST	Huber 55'	Report	Bajić 14'; Domovchiyski 23'; Beichler 49'; Wolze 81', 82', 85'; Exslager 87'	Attendance: 250

19 June 2011	SC Austria Lustenau	1–3	(Germany) MSV Duisburg
16:00	Csobali 68'	Report	Bollmann 17'; Šukalo 26'; Brosinski 37'

22 June 2011	SC Kriens (Austria)	1–3	(Germany) MSV Duisburg
18:00	Tadic 12'	Report	Šukalo 15'; Domovchiyski 18'; Exslager 61'

26 June 2011	SF Hamborn 07 (Germany)	0–5	(Germany) MSV Duisburg	Duisburg
15:00				Stadium: Im Holtkamp

28 June 2011	MSV Duisburg (Germany)	3–2	(Bulgaria) PFC Litex Lovech
19:00

1 July 2011	VfL Bochum (Germany)	2–0	(Germany) MSV Duisburg	Harsewinkel
17:00	Ginczek 61'; Reiche 81' (o.g.)	Report		Stadium: Moddenbachstadion

3 July 2011	FC Blau-Weiss Linz (Austria)	0–2	(Germany) MSV Duisburg	Linz
19:00		Report	Gjasula 59'; Jula 71'	Stadium: Linzer Donaupark-Stadion; Attendance: 750

5 July 2011	Budapest Honvéd FC (Hungary)	0–3	(Germany) MSV Duisburg	Windischgarsten
17:00		Report	Bollmann 1'; Hoffmann 42'; Brosinski 74'

8 July 2011	Legia Warszawa (Poland)	1–3	(Germany) MSV Duisburg
18:15	Soares 1' (o.g.)	Report	10' (o.g.); Bollmann 21'; Brosinski 30'

26 July 2011	MSV Duisburg (Germany)	2–1	(Germany) FC Schalke 04	Duisburg
18:45	Brosinski 21'; Soares 66'	Report	Edu 7'	Stadium: Schauinsland-Reisen-Arena; Attendance: 9,027

31 August 2011	SV Wehen Wiesbaden (Germany)	1–1	(Germany) MSV Duisburg	Bad Kreuznach
17:00	Bouhaddouz 16'	Report	Kunt 42'

3 September 2011	Mönchengladbach (Germany)	3–1	(Germany) MSV Duisburg
15:30

13 January 2011	MSV Duisburg (Germany)	3–2	(Germany) Preußen Münster	Duisburg
	Brosinski 21'; Jula 47'; Baljak 55'	Report	Büscher 28'; Schreder 82'	Stadium: Westender Straße; Attendance: 407

18 January 2011	FC Energie Cottbus (Germany)	2–2	(Germany) MSV Duisburg	Antalya, Turkey
15:00 CET	Adlung 38'; Soares 51'	Report	Wolze 79'; Exslager 84'

22 January 2011	Red Bull Salzburg (Austria)	2–1	(Germany) MSV Duisburg	Antalya, Turkey
	Pasanen 77'; Wallner 87'	Report	Lázok 75'	Attendance: 77

23 January 2011	CS Pandurii Târgu Jiu (Romania)	3–2	(Germany) MSV Duisburg	Antalya, Turkey
15:00	Cristea 18', 33' (pen.); Matulevičius 24'	Report	Domovchiyski 39'; Jula 53'

23 January 2011	MSV Duisburg (Germany)	1–1	(Germany) Mönchengladbach II	Duisburg
15:00	Hoffmann 60'	Report	Otsu 78'	Attendance: 777

== Squad statistics ==
All competitions combined.

Number	Player	Games played	Goals	Yellow cards	Yellow/Red cards	Red cards	Subon	Subout
1	Roland Müller	0	0	0	0	0	0	0
2	Vasileios Pliatsikas	24	1	5	2	0	4	4
3	Markus Bollmann	12	0	1	0	0	4	2
4	Džemal Berberović	31	1	9	1	0	0	1
5	Daniel Reiche	0	0	0	0	0	0	0
6	Benjamin Kern	19	0	1	0	0	3	4
7	Daniel Brosinski	35	4	5	0	0	4	17
8	Maurice Exslager	20	3	1	0	0	10	7
9	Valeri Domovchiyski	26	2	6	0	0	11	12
10	Jürgen Gjasula	31	3	9	0	0	5	7
11	Srđan Baljak	8	0	1	0	0	7	1
13	Sergei Karimov	3	0	0	0	0	0	2
14	Bruno Soares	34	2	11	0	0	0	1
15	Goran Šukalo	31	5	11	0	0	0	7
17	Kevin Wolze	35	4	7	0	0	2	10
18	Felix Wiedwald	20	0	1	0	0	0	0
19	Zvonko Pamić	25	1	4	0	0	15	6
21	André Hoffmann	24	1	6	0	0	5	6
22	János Lázok	7	0	0	0	0	3	3
23	Florian Fromlowitz	16	0	1	0	0	0	0
25	Branimir Bajić (c)	32	6	10	0	0	0	1
26	Tanju Öztürk	8	0	0	0	0	3	1
27	Emil Jula	24	4	6	0	0	4	6
28	Dušan Jevtić	1	0	0	0	0	1	0
28	Daniel Beichler	2	0	0	0	0	2	0
29	Burakcan Kunt	0	0	0	0	0	0	0
30	Marcel Lenz	0	0	0	0	0	0	0
32	Flamur Kastrati	19	0	3	0	0	12	4
33	Tomasz Zahorski	4	0	0	0	0	3	1
33	Shao Jiayi	11	1	0	0	0	8	3
