= Bruno Chalkiadakis =

Greek footballer (born 1993)

Personal information
- Full name: Bruno Araújo Chalkiadakis
- Date of birth: 7 April 1993 (age 33)
- Place of birth: Viçosa do Ceará, Brazil
- Height: 1.81 m (5 ft 11 in)
- Position: Attacking midfielder

Team information
- Current team: AER Afantou

Youth career
- 2006–2008: Juazeiro
- 2008–2011: Ergotelis

Senior career*
Years	Team	Apps	(Gls)
2011–2015	Ergotelis	52	(5)
2015–2016	Panionios	31	(2)
2017	Cascavel	14	(1)
2017–2018	PAS Giannina	31	(3)
2018	Hermannstadt	8	(0)
2019	AEL	3	(0)
2020–2021	Santorini	19	(4)
2021–2022	Cascavel	6	(1)
2022	Agrotikos Asteras	6	(1)
2022	Keravnos Angelochori	12	(2)
2022–2023	Chalkida	16	(2)
2023	Panargiakos	10	(1)
2023–2024	Panthrakikos	22	(4)
2024–	AER Afantou		

International career
2012	Greece U19	3	(0)
- * Club domestic league appearances and goals as of 21:00, 5 June 2022 (UTC)

Bruno Araújo da Silva Chalkiadakis (Greek: Μπρούνο Αραούχο ντα Σίλβα Χαλκιαδάκης, born 7 April 1993), sometimes known as just Bruno, is a professional footballer who plays as an attacking midfielder for Gamma Ethniki club AER Afantou. Born in Brazil, he has represented Greece at the youth level.

== Club career ==
=== Ergotelis ===
Chalkiadakis arrived in Greece at the age of 16, when he was spotted by Ergotelis scouters in Brazil. Considering him to be a strong prospect for the men's team, the club quickly arranged for his legal adoption by the club-affiliated Chalkiadakis family, which earned him Greek citizenship. He initially played with the youth team of Ergotelis, and signed his first professional contract with the club on 24 May 2011. He made his debut as a substitute on 11 December 2011, in a home match against club rival OFI.
Bruno renewed his contract with the club on 21 August 2014, after a short-term dispute which temporarily placed him out of the team and had since been a regular starter. Despite Ergotelis' relegation at the end of the season, he impressed with his skills, having scored 5 goals in a total of 29 season appearances for the club. He scored his first goal in a 4–1 away win against Niki Volos on 21 September 2014.

=== Panionios ===
On 21 May 2015, Chalkiadakis was transferred to Greek Super League champions Olympiacos, signing a 5-year contract with the club. He was eventually, however, not included in the club's roster selection and as a result, he was released from his contract to sign a two-year deal with fellow Super League side Panionios as a free agent. Bruno spent the majority of the 2015−16 season playing as a substitute, making a total of 31 appearances for the club and scoring two goals during the Greek Cup Group stage. Panionios finished in fifth place and would have qualified for the Europa League second qualifying round, but they were eventually excluded from participating in the 2016–17 European competitions by UEFA for financial reasons. In the summer of 2016, Bruno Chalkiadakis breached his contract with Panionios after failing to report for the club's 2016−17 activities after his official leave for spending the summer vacation in his hometown expired.

=== Cascavel ===
During his stay in Brazil, Chalkiadakis played football for Paraná local side Cascavel during the first half of 2017.

=== PAS Giannina ===
In July 2017, Bruno Chalkiadakis returned to Greece and signed a contract with Super League club PAS Giannina for a duration of 3 years. On 18 September 2017, he scored his first goal for the club in a 1−1 home draw game against his former club Panionios. On 14 October 2017, he scored during a 3−1 home Super League win game against Platanias. He finished the season with 3 goals and 4 assists in 31 club appearances in both League and Cup competitions. In June 2018, Chalkiadakis was released from his contract with PAS Giannina on mutual consent.

=== Hermannstadt ===
On 5 July 2018, Bruno Chalkiadakis signed with Romanian club Hermannstadt based in the city of Sibiu, playing in the Liga I, for 2 years for an undisclosed fee.

=== Santorini 2020 ===
In October 2020, Bruno Chalkiadakis signed for AE Santorini 2020.

=== Agrotikos Asteras ===
In February 2022, Bruno Chalkiadakis returned to the Greek League, signing a contract with Agrotikos Asteras.

== International career ==
Having acquired Greek citizenship, Bruno Chalkiadakis is eligible to play for Greece and was actually called up in their U19 pre-selection for the 2012 Qatar Youth International Tournament along with team-mate Andreas Bouchalakis, before suffering an anterior cruciate ligament injury during a post-season Ergotelis friendly, which eventually kept him out of the tournament.
