= Juan Ferrando =

Spanish football manager

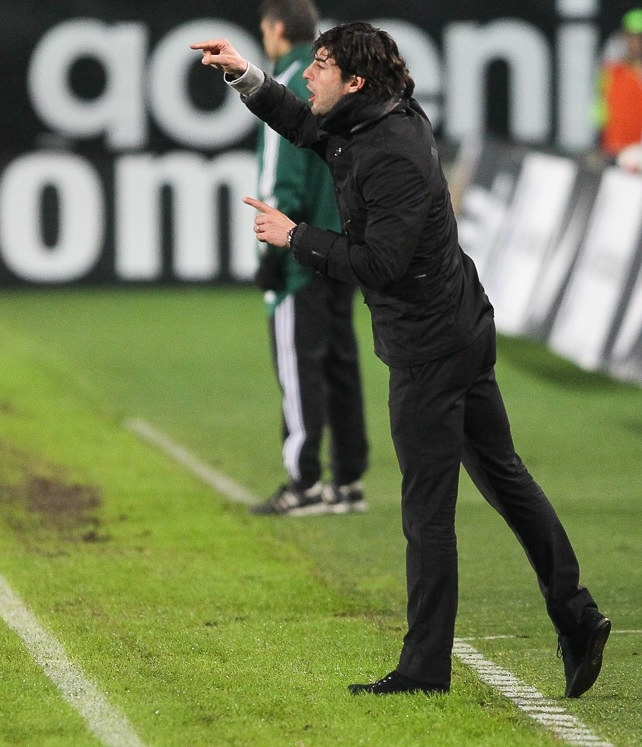
- Ferrando with Sheriff Tiraspol in 2013

Personal information
- Full name: Juan Ferrando Fenoll
- Date of birth: 2 January 1981 (age 45)
- Place of birth: Barcelona, Spain
- Height: 1.87 m (6 ft 2 in)

Managerial career
- Years: Team
- 2009–2010: Premià (youth)
- 2010–2011: Terrassa (youth)
- 2011–2012: Hospitalet (youth)
- 2012–2013: Málaga (youth)
- 2013: Sheriff Tiraspol (assistant)
- 2013: Sheriff Tiraspol
- 2014: Ergotelis
- 2015–2016: Cultural Leonesa
- 2017: Linares
- 2017–2020: Volos
- 2020–2021: Goa
- 2021–2024: Mohun Bagan
- 2024: AEK Larnaca
- 2024–2025: Panserraikos
- 2025–2026: Volos
- 2026: Panionios

Juan Ferrando Fenoll (Catalan: Joan Ferrando; born 2 January 1981) is a Spanish professional football manager.

== Managerial career ==
After several injuries as a footballer, Ferrando started his managerial career at age 18. He graduated from the school of Espanyol, where he was campus and methodological coordinator (fitness, tactical and technical football); and had his 'Prácticum' at Barcelona B. He then spent consecutive seasons managing Premià, Terrassa and Hospitalet.

In the 2012−13 season, he became part of the technical staff of La Liga club Málaga, being appointed head coach of the club's youth team. Then, in mid-June 2013, he joined Moldovan National Division champions Sheriff Tiraspol as assistant coach; in July, he appointed as the head coach with whom he won the Moldovan Super Cup. As a manager of Sheriff Tiraspol, Ferrando led the Moldovans to the UEFA Champions League third qualifying round for the first time in their history. Failing to overcome Dinamo Zagreb to further advance to the Group Stage, he managed to eliminate Vojvodina during the Europa League play-off Round, advancing Sheriff to the Europa League Group Stage for the second time in the club's history. Playing against Tottenham, Anzhi and Tromsø, Sheriff finished third with six points, two short of qualification to the next phase. The day after, he was dismissed from Sheriff.

In 2014, Ferrando moved to Greece and took over management of Super League side Ergotelis, but was fired after the two first matches of the 2014–15 season, having suffered two losses. Returning to Spain in 2015, he was hired by Cultural Leonesa, finishing in seventh place. In 2017, Linares relied on Ferrando for the last days of the 2016-17 season, but he could do little to prevent the team from being relegated. Shortly after Ferrando submitted his resignation for disagreements of sports planning, he was hired by newly formed Greek Third Division side Volos, whom he managed to consecutively achieve promotion to the second and first divisions in the following two years. Unfortunately, he had to leave Volos due to a bacterial eye infection, which nearly blinded him.

Oon 30 April 2020, after a full recovery, he was appointed as the head coach of Indian Super League club Goa. On 14 April 2021, he guided Goa to their first ever AFC Champions League point by any Indian team in a 0–0 draw against Al-Rayyan.

In 2021, he managed Goa at the 130th edition of Durand Cup and reached to the final, defeating Bengalaru 7–6 in sudden death. On 3 October, they clinched their first ever Durand Cup title, defeating Mohammedan 1–0, and which was his maiden trophy in India. On 20 December, Goa announced that Ferrando had stepped down as the head coach of the club by activating a release clause in his contract. In a surprising turn of events, Ferrando resigned from his position in Goa on 20 December 2021 to become the head coach of another ISL club Mohun Bagan. He succeeded Antonio Lopez Habas at Mohun Bagan and won the first match in his tenure 3–2 against North East United.

As 2022–23 season began, his club appeared on 20 August against Rajasthan United at the 131st edition of Durand Cup, in which they were defeated by 3–2. But despite all odds he helped the club win the ISL title that season.

In the 2023–24 season, Mohun Bagan, led by Ferrando, showcased mixed results with six wins, one draw and three losses in the Indian Super League. Despite only two AFC Cup victories, Ferrando secured the Durand Cup. However, on January 3, 2024, a mutual termination of Ferrando's contract marked the end of their association.

== Managerial statistics ==
Managerial record by team and tenure
Team	Nat.	From	To	Record								Ref.
Team	Nat.	From	To	M	W	D	L	GF	GA	GD	Win %	Ref.
Sheriff Tiraspol	(Moldova)	1 July 2013	13 December 2013	31	19	7	5	72	22	+50	61.29	
Ergotelis	(Greece)	3 July 2014	1 September 2014	2	0	0	2	1	4	−3	0.00	
Cultural Leonesa	(Spain)	10 July 2015	30 June 2016	40	15	14	11	43	37	+6	37.50	
Linares	(Spain)	4 April 2017	11 July 2017	8	2	2	4	6	11	−5	25.00	
Volos	(Greece)	12 July 2017	2 January 2020	78	45	15	18	156	83	+73	57.69	
Goa	(India)	30 April 2020	20 December 2021	40	14	17	9	61	51	+10	35.00	
Mohun Bagan	(India)	20 December 2021	3 January 2024	77	42	15	20	134	84	+50	54.55	
AEK Larnaca	(Cyprus)	1 July 2024	9 August 2024	2	0	0	2	0	5	−5	0.00	
Panserraikos	(Greece)	18 September 2024	1 June 2025	35	12	6	17	39	55	−16	34.29	
Volos	(Greece)	1 July 2025	8 February 2026	25	11	2	12	32	35	−3	44.00	
Panionios	(Greece)	31 May 2026	8 November 2026	11	5	2	4	14	12	+2	45.45	
Total				349	165	80	104	558	399	+159	47.28	

== Honours ==
Sheriff Tiraspol

- Moldovan Super Cup: 2013

Volos

- Gamma Ethniki: 2017–18
- Football League: 2018–19

Goa

- Durand Cup: 2021

Mohun Bagan

- ISL Cup: 2022–23
- Durand Cup: 2023
