= Gerrit Wegkamp =

German footballer (born 1993)

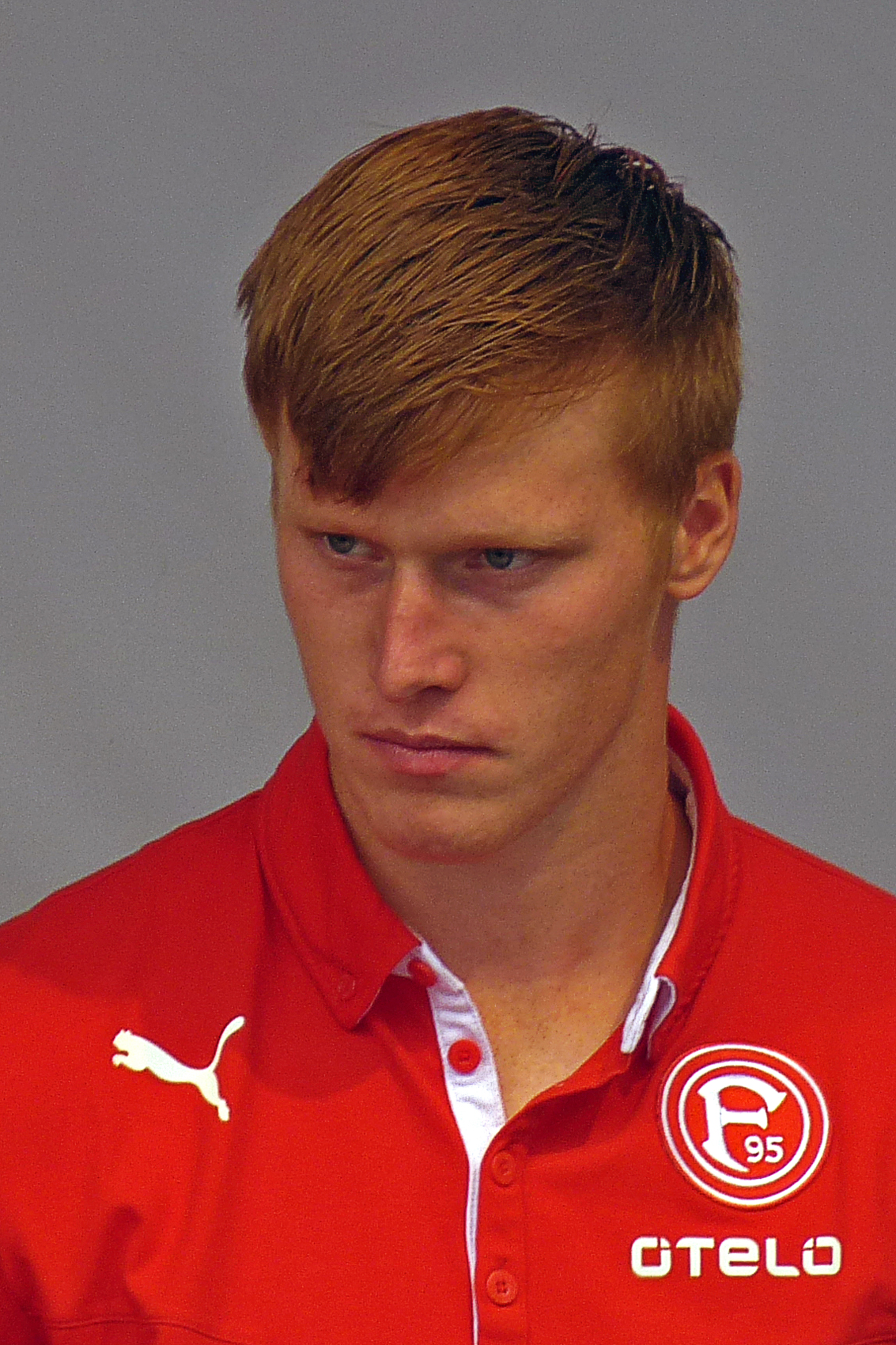
- Wegkamp with Fortuna Düsseldorf in 2013

Personal information
- Date of birth: 13 April 1993 (age 33)
- Place of birth: Ochtrup, Germany
- Height: 1.93 m (6 ft 4 in)
- Position: Striker

Team information
- Current team: Schalke 04 II
- Number: 9

Youth career
- 1997–2004: SV Suddendorf-Samern
- 2004–2010: SV Bad Bentheim
- 2010–2011: VfL Osnabrück

Senior career*
Years	Team	Apps	(Gls)
2011–2012	VfL Osnabrück	21	(4)
2012–2014	Fortuna Düsseldorf II	28	(5)
2012–2014	Fortuna Düsseldorf	6	(0)
2014	→ MSV Duisburg (loan)	15	(0)
2014–2015	Bayern Munich II	37	(15)
2015–2018	VfR Aalen	100	(16)
2018–2019	Sportfreunde Lotte	33	(2)
2019–2021	FSV Zwickau	42	(6)
2021–2024	Preußen Münster	122	(46)
2024–2026	MSV Duisburg	19	(2)
2025–2026	→ Schalke 04 II (loan)	27	(10)
2026–	Schalke 04 II	0	(0)

International career
2011–2012	Germany U19	3	(1)
- * Club domestic league appearances and goals as of 30 April 2026

Gerrit Wegkamp (born 13 April 1993) is a German professional footballer who plays as a striker for Schalke 04 II. He previously played for VfL Osnabrück, Fortuna Düsseldorf II, Fortuna Düsseldorf, Bayern Munich II, VfR Aalen, Sportfreunde Lotte, FSV Zwickau, Preußen Münster and MSV Duisburg.

== Club career ==
Born in Ochtrup, Wegkamp played youth football for SV Suddendorf-Samern and SV Bad Bentheim, before joining VfL Osnabrück where he began his senior career. He impressed for the youth sides at Osnabrück during the 2010–11 season, and made his senior debut for the club on 23 July 2020 in a 1–0 3. Liga victory away to SV Darmstadt 98. His first senior goal came in the next game; a 3–2 DFB-Pokal defeat to TSV 1860 Munich on 29 July 2011. Wegkamp was noted for his potential, and he signed a contract extension until 2014 in September 2011. Wegkamp was a regular player for Osnabrück in the first half of the season, though failed to appear for the club during the second half of the season as a result of a foot injury suffered in January 2012. He made a total of 21 league appearances during the 2011–12 season, scoring four goals.

Having impressed at Osnabrück, Wegkamp joined Bundesliga side Fortuna Düsseldorf on a three-year contract for an undisclosed fee. He initially joined up with the club's reserve side, making his debut for Fortuna Düsseldorf II on 17 August 2012 in a 1–0 defeat to Sportfreunde Lotte, and scored his first goal for them on 22 September 2012 in a 2–1 victory away to SC Verl. Across the season, he made three appearances in the Bundesliga for Fortuna Düsseldorf, the first being as a substitute in a 3–2 defeat away to Bayer 04 Leverkusen on 4 November 2012, and 23 league appearances for Fortuna Düsseldorf II, scoring four. After 3 first team appearances for Fortuna in the first half of the 2013–14 season, before joining 3. Liga side MSV Duisburg on loan on the final day of the January transfer window. He made 15 appearances for Duisburg, though did not score. In the summer of 2014, Wegkamp left Düsseldorf, joining Bayern Munich II. He made 34 appearances for them across the 2014–15 season, scoring 15.

In August 2015, Wegkamp signed for newly relegated 2. Bundesliga side VfR Aalen after 5 appearances for Bayern Munich II. His first appearance for the club came on He suffered a foot injury in April 2016, ruling him out for Aalen's last few games of the season. He made his debut for the club on 30 August 2015 in a 1–1 draw at home to Hansa Rostock, and scored his first goal for them in the following match; a 56th minute finish to round off the scoring in a 4–0 victory away to Energie Cottbus and was praised for his performance. He made 25 appearances for Aalen, scoring three and assisting three goals across the 2015–16 season as his season was cut short through injury in April 2016.

The 2016–17 saw more consistent performances from Wegkamp, scoring 11 goals in 37 appearances as Aalen finished 11th despite a 9-point deduction. With his contract set to expire in the summer of 2017, he signed a two-year contract extension following the end of the 2016–17 season. He made 33 appearances for Aalen, scoring twice across the 2017–18 season as Aalen finished 12th on 50 points.

On 31 August 2018, the last day of the German transfer window, Wegkamp joined 3. Liga club Sportfreunde Lotte on a two-year contract after 5 appearances for Aalen that season. His first appearance came the following day in a 3–1 victory away to Karlsruher SC as he would make 33 appearances for Lotte across the 2018–19 season, scoring twice.

Wegkamp signed for 3. Liga club FSV Zwickau on a two-year contract in the summer of 2019. He made his debut for the club on 20 July 2019 and scored the opening goal as Zwickau defeated SV Meppen 2–0.

In December 2020 it was announced Wegkamp would terminate his contract with FSV Zwickau and join Regionalliga West club SC Preußen Münster in January 2021. In June 2024, he moved back to MSV Duisburg. In July 2025, he was loaned to Schalke 04 II for the 2025–26 season. In July 2026, he moved permanently to Schalke II.

== International career ==
Between 2011 and 2012, Wegkamp made three appearances for the Germany national under-19 football team, scoring once.

== Career statistics ==
As of match played 26 April 2026

Appearances and goals by club, season and competition
Club	Season	League			DFB-Pokal		Total	
Club	Season	Division	Apps	Goals	Apps	Goals	Apps	Goals
VfL Osnabrück	2011–12	3. Liga	21	4	1	1	22	5
Fortuna Düsseldorf	2012–13	Bundesliga	3	0	1	0	4	0
Fortuna Düsseldorf	2013–14	2. Bundesliga	3	0	1	0	4	0
Fortuna Düsseldorf	Total		6	0	2	0	8	0
Fortuna Düsseldorf II	2012–13	Regionalliga West	23	4	—		23	4
Fortuna Düsseldorf II	2013–14	Regionalliga West	5	1	—		5	1
Fortuna Düsseldorf II	Total		28	5	0	0	28	5
MSV Duisburg	2013–14	3. Liga	15	0	0	0	15	0
Bayern Munich II	2014–15	Regionalliga Bayern	34	15	—		34	15
Bayern Munich II	2015–16	Regionalliga Bayern	3	0	—		3	0
Bayern Munich II	Total		37	15	0	0	37	15
VfR Aalen	2015–16	3. Liga	25	3	0	0	25	3
VfR Aalen	2016–17	3. Liga	37	11	—		37	11
VfR Aalen	2017–18	3. Liga	33	2	—		33	2
VfR Aalen	2018–19	3. Liga	5	0	—		5	0
VfR Aalen	Total		100	16	0	0	100	16
Sportfreunde Lotte	2018–19	3. Liga	33	2	—		33	2
FSV Zwickau	2019–20	3. Liga	36	6	—		36	6
FSV Zwickau	2020–21	3. Liga	6	0	—		6	0
FSV Zwickau	Total		42	6	0	0	42	6
Preußen Münster	2020–21	Regionalliga West	17	8	—		17	8
Preußen Münster	2021–22	Regionalliga West	35	11	2	0	37	11
Preußen Münster	2022–23	Regionalliga West	33	22	—		33	22
Preußen Münster	2023–24	3. Liga	37	5	1	0	38	5
Preußen Münster	Total		122	46	3	0	125	46
MSV Duisburg	2024–25	Regionalliga West	19	2	—		19	2
Schalke 04 II	2025–26	Regionalliga West	27	10	—		27	10
Career total			450	106	6	1	456	107
