= Ignacio Fideleff =

Argentine-Italian footballer

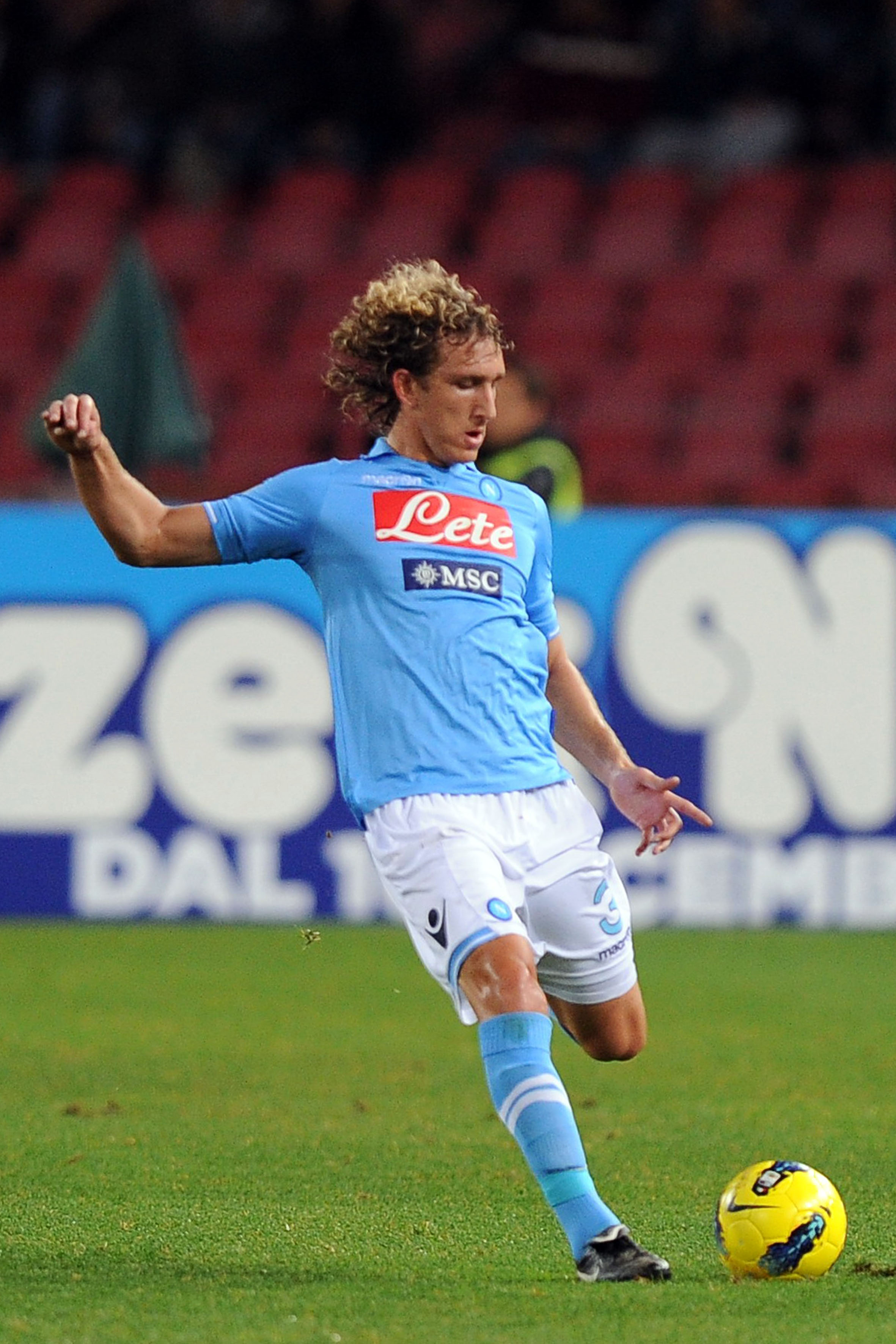
- Fideleff playing for SSC Napoli in 2011

Personal information
- Full name: Ignacio David Fideleff
- Date of birth: 4 July 1989 (age 37)
- Place of birth: Rosario, Argentina
- Height: 1.92 m (6 ft 4 in)
- Position: Centre back

Youth career
- 2004–2008: Newell's Old Boys

Senior career*
Years	Team	Apps	(Gls)
2008–2011	Newell's Old Boys	35	(3)
2011–2017	Napoli	4	(0)
2012	→ Parma (loan)	1	(0)
2013	→ Maccabi Tel Aviv (loan)	7	(0)
2013–2014	→ Tigre (loan)	13	(0)
2014–2015	→ Ergotelis (loan)	7	(1)
2016–2017	→ Nacional (loan)		
2018	→ ÍBV (loan)	0	(0)
2018	PS Kemi	0	(0)
2019–2020	St. Lucia		

International career
2009	Argentina U20	9	(1)
- * Club domestic league appearances and goals as of 21:18, 24 October 2019 (UTC)

Ignacio David Fideleff (born 4 July 1989) is an Argentinian exfootballer who used to play as a centre back.

== Early life ==
He was born in Rosario, in the province of Santa Fe, Argentina, where he took his first steps in football at Club Atletico Newell's Old Boys until his debut in 2008. He has Italian citizenship, inherited from his mother in 2010, in addition to Israeli citizenship obtained in 2013 and Paraguayan citizenship obtained in 2016.

== Career ==
Fideleff was born in Rosario, Santa Fe and grown up as a footballer in Club Atlético Newell's Old Boys' youths. He made his debut for the Newell's first team on 24 March 2008 against Lanús, after Nicolas Spolli's injury and with coach Ricardo Caruso Lombardi, scoring a goal. He played for the club for five seasons, collecting 35 appearances in Argentine Primera División, scoring 3 goals.

During his time at Newell's, Ignacio played several matches, both in the Argentine Primera Division at the local level and in the Copa Sudamericana and Copa Libertadores at the international level.

At the start of the 2011–12 season, Fideleff was purchased by Serie A club Napoli, for a reported fee of around €3m, believed to be a substitute for Spaniard Victor Ruiz who was sold to Valencia and Salvatore Aronica that was injured. Initially his contract was for 2 years, which after 1 year was extended for 5 years until 2017. He debuted in Serie A on 21 September 2011, featuring in the starting line-up against Veronese club Chievo. On May 20, 2012, Ignacio became the champion of the Coppa Italia with SSC Napoli, beating Juventus 2–0 in the final.

On 14 July 2012, Fideleff joined Parma on a loan deal for the 2012-13 season.

On 30 January 2013, Fideleff joined Maccabi Tel Aviv on a loan deal for the remainder of the season. The deal came through after Fideleff received an Israeli citizenship due to his Jewish origins.

On 5 August 2013, Fideleff returned to Argentina to join Tigre on a season-long loan and was under the direction of coach Diego Cagna.

On January 10, 2016, he was presented as a new player for Nacional de Paraguay, which had just finished runner-up in the Copa Libertadores in 2014 and was putting together a competitive team for that season.

In January 2018, Fideleff signed with ÍBV of the Icelandic Úrvalsdeild karla. In April it was reported that he had been released by ÍBV due to injury.

Fideleff moved to Malta in the summer 2019 and signed with Maltese club St. Lucia on 5 July 2019.

After a 12-year career, several injuries and adding the pandemic that began in 2020, Ignacio decided to retire from football at the age of 30. He currently holds a coaching license from the Italian Football Federation, which he completed while living in Italy. Today he is managing the lower divisions of Crucero del Norte.

== National team ==
He has been an international with the Argentina U-20 team, integrating the squad that played the 2009 South American U-20 Championship and led by Sergio Batista. Said squad was sparring for the Argentina team during 2009, which had outstanding players such as Gabriel Heinze, Javier Zanetti, Juan Sebastián Verón, Pablo Aimar, Angel Di Maria, Sergio Agüero, Carlos Tevez, Diego Milito, Gonzalo Higuaín, Maximiliano Rodríguez and Lionel Messi, among others.

== Honours ==
Napoli

- Coppa Italia: 2011–12

Maccabi Tel Aviv

- Israeli Premier League: 2012–13
