= Aleksandar Nosković =

Serbian footballer

Personal information
- Full name: Aleksandar Nosković
- Date of birth: 12 December 1988 (age 37)
- Place of birth: Subotica, SFR Yugoslavia
- Height: 1.83 m (6 ft 0 in)
- Position: Forward

Youth career
- Preporod Novi Žednik

Senior career*
Years	Team	Apps	(Gls)
2005–2006	Radnički Bajmok		
2007	Spartak Subotica	7	(0)
2007–2008	Zlatibor Voda	17	(5)
2008–2014	Spartak Subotica	151	(27)
2014	Ergotelis	9	(1)
2015	OFK Bačka	9	(0)
2016	Bačka 1901	15	(3)
2016–2019	Bratstvo Prigrevica	43	(18)
2019	Bačka 1901		
2020	Lokomotiva Subotica		
- * Club domestic league appearances and goals as of 13 May 2020

Aleksandar Nosković (Serbian Cyrillic: Александар Носковић; born 12 December 1988) is a Serbian professional footballer who plays as a forward.

== Career ==
Nosković started out at his local club Preporod Novi Žednik, before making his senior debuts with Radnički Bajmok. He was transferred to Spartak Subotica in the 2007 winter transfer window. After spending a season at Zlatibor Voda, Nosković rejoined Spartak Subotica following the merger of these two clubs. He spent a total of six seasons with the Golubovi, amassing 131 appearances and scoring 22 goals in the top flight. In the summer of 2014, Nosković moved abroad to Greece and signed for Ergotelis.

== Statistics ==
Club	Season	League		Cup		Continental		Total	
Club	Season	Apps	Goals	Apps	Goals	Apps	Goals	Apps	Goals
Spartak Subotica	2009–10	28	4	2	0	—		30	4
Spartak Subotica	2010–11	22	4	3	2	4	0	29	6
Spartak Subotica	2011–12	29	5	3	0	—		32	5
Spartak Subotica	2012–13	25	5	2	0	—		27	5
Spartak Subotica	2013–14	27	4	5	5	—		32	9
Spartak Subotica	Total	131	22	15	7	4	0	150	29
