= Rok Štraus =

Slovenian footballer

Personal information
- Full name: Rok Štraus
- Date of birth: 3 March 1987 (age 39)
- Place of birth: Maribor, SFR Yugoslavia
- Height: 1.74 m (5 ft 9 in)
- Position: Midfielder

Team information
- Current team: FC Gratkorn

Youth career
- –2003: Maribor
- 2003–2004: Izola
- Internazionale
- 2004–2005: Messina

Senior career*
Years	Team	Apps	(Gls)
2003	Izola	2	(0)
2005–2008	Messina	0	(0)
2005	→ Rieti (loan)	11	(0)
2006	→ Brescia (loan)	2	(0)
2007	→ Salernitana (loan)	0	(0)
2008–2011	Celje	86	(8)
2011–2014	Cracovia	55	(0)
2014–2015	Ergotelis	1	(0)
2015	Widzew Łódź	9	(0)
2015–2016	Yokohama FC	13	(0)
2017	Utenis	4	(0)
2017–2020	Celje	47	(0)
2021–2022	FC Trofaiach		
2022	SV Gralla		
2022–2023	SV Rottenmann		
2024–	FC Gratkorn		
- * Club domestic league appearances and goals as of 3 March 2024

Rok Štraus (born 3 March 1987) is a Slovenian footballer who plays as a defensive or central midfielder for Austrian club FC Gratkorn.

== Career ==
=== Messina ===
Štraus began his senior career in Italy at ACR Messina. On 1 January 2006 he was loaned to second division Italian club Brescia for 6 months before rejoining Messina on 30 June 2006.

=== Salernitana ===
On 1 July 2017 Štraus joined the second division Italian club, Salernitana.

=== NK Celje ===
On 1 January 2008 Štraus returned to Slovenia and signed a contract with first division club Celje.

=== Cracovia ===
In June 2011, he joined Polish first division club Cracovia on a three-year contract on a free transfer.

=== Ergotelis ===
On 17 July 2014 Štraus joined Ergotelis, a Greek second division club on a free transfer.

=== Widzew Lodz ===
On 3 March 2015 Rok Štraus went back to Poland to join second division club, Widzew Łódź on a free transfer.

=== Yokohama FC ===
On 24 August 2015 he joined Japanese first division club, Yokohama FC on a free transfer.

=== Free agent ===
After leaving Yokohama FC on 1 January 2017, Štraus was a free agent for 4 months.

=== Utenis ===
On 25 April 2017, Štraus joined Lithuanian A Lyga side Utenis, but he couldn't earn a lot of playing time and managed to appear only in four games before being released on 30 June 2017 as a free agent.

=== NK Celje ===
On 12 December 2017 Rok Štraus went back to Slovenia and rejoined NK Celje where he is now. He has made 49 appearances for the club ever since for a total of 1,289 minutes. He has racked up 7 yellow cards but has yet to score a goal or an assist.

== Stats ==
Stats By Season:	05/06 Brescia	07/08 NK Celje	08/09 NK Celje	09/10 Celje	10/11 Celje	11/12 Cracovia	12/13 Cracovia	13/14 Cracovia	14/15 Ergotelis
Appearances	2	9	27	29	26	11	20	28	3
Goals	0	0	5	3	1	0	1	0	0
Assists	0	0	4	4	3	1	3	0	0
Yellow/Red Cards	0/0	0/0	2/0	5/0	3/0	0/0	9/0	2/0	0/0
Minutes	8	215	1,567	2,405	1,607	382	1,640	2,121	225

Stats By Season:	14/15 Widzew Lodz	2015 Yokohama FC	2016 Yokohama FC	2017 Utenis	17/18 Celje	18/19 Celje	19/20 Celje	20/21 Celje
Appearances	9	4	12	4	7	21	19	2
Goals	0	0	0	0	0	0	0	0
Assists	0	1	0	0	0	1	0	0
Yellow/Red Cards	0/0	1/1	0/0	0/0	0/0	1/0	5/0	1/0
Minutes	629	164	334	249	281	389	564	55

== Honours ==
Celje

- Slovenian PrvaLiga: 2019–20
