= Maximilian Güll =

German footballer

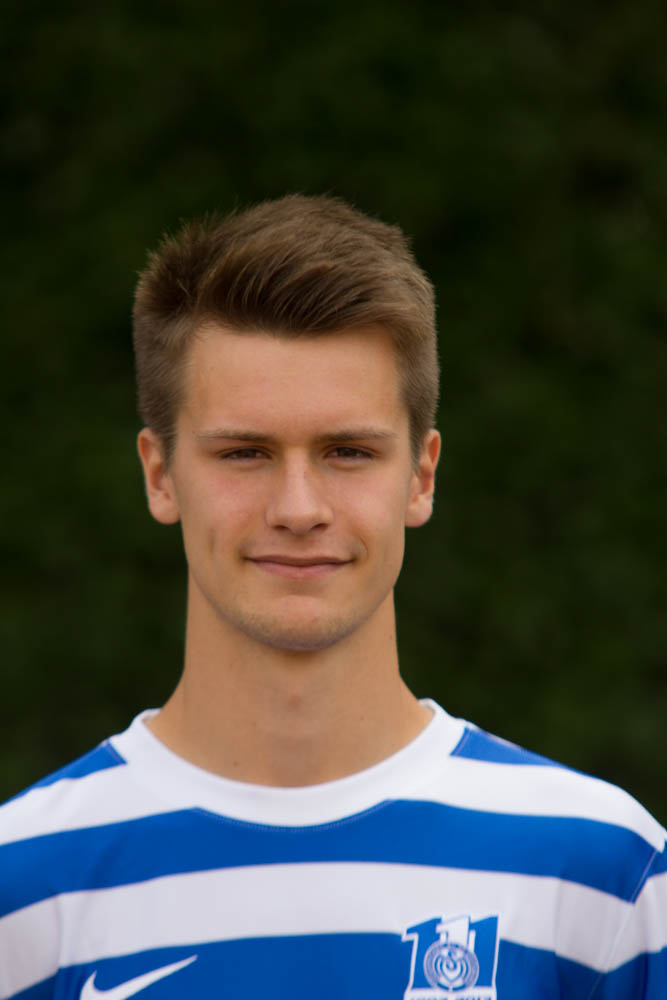
- Maximilian Güll in 2013

Personal information
- Date of birth: 5 January 1995 (age 31)
- Place of birth: Duisburg, Germany
- Height: 1.83 m (6 ft 0 in)
- Position: Defender

Team information
- Current team: 1. FC Bocholt
- Number: 31

Youth career
- 2000–2005: PSV Siegfried Hamborn
- 2005–2013: MSV Duisburg

Senior career*
Years	Team	Apps	(Gls)
2013–2014	MSV Duisburg	11	(0)
2013–2014	→ MSV Duisburg II	2	(0)
2014–2016	Borussia Dortmund II	21	(0)
2016–2017	KFC Uerdingen 05	12	(0)
2017–2018	Schwarz-Weiß Essen	8	(0)
2018–	1. FC Bocholt	15	(1)

International career^{‡}
2014–	Germany U20	1	(0)
- * Club domestic league appearances and goals as of 14 January 2021 ‡ National team caps and goals as of 10 September 2014

Maximilian Güll (born 5 January 1995) is a German footballer who plays for 1. FC Bocholt in Regionalliga West.
