= Burakcan Kunt =

Turkish footballer

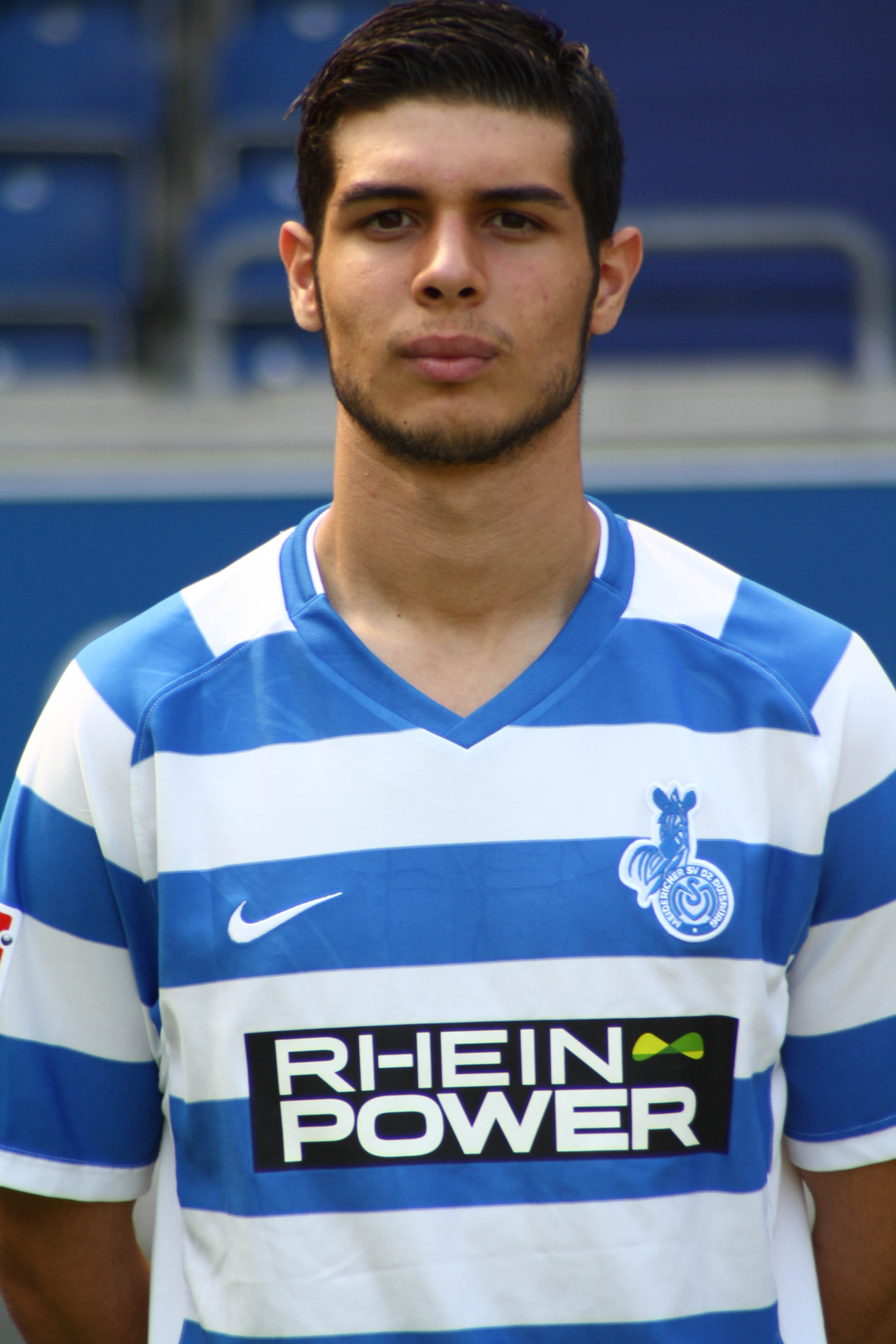

Personal information
- Date of birth: 15 May 1992 (age 34)
- Place of birth: Cologne, Germany
- Height: 1.84 m (6 ft 1/2 in)
- Position: Midfielder

Team information
- Current team: 1928 Bucaspor
- Number: 15

Youth career
- –2008: 1. FC Köln
- 2008–: MSV Duisburg

Senior career*
Years	Team	Apps	(Gls)
2010–2013	MSV Duisburg	7	(0)
2013–2014	Balıkesirspor II	12	(3)
2014–2016	Bucaspor	39	(5)
2016–2017	Manisa BBSK	30	(5)
2017	Kırklarelispor	12	(1)
2018	Kastamonuspor 1966	12	(1)
2018–2019	Kahramanmaraşspor	44	(6)
2020	Sakaryaspor	3	(0)
2020–	1928 Bucaspor	6	(0)

International career
2011	Turkey U19	2	(0)
- * Club domestic league appearances and goals as of 22:42, 28 December 2020 (UTC)

Burakcan Kunt (born 15 May 1992) is a Turkish footballer who plays as a midfielder for 1928 Bucaspor. Kunt made his full debut on 24 April 2010 in a 2. Bundesliga match against SC Paderborn 07.
