= Julien Rybacki =

German footballer

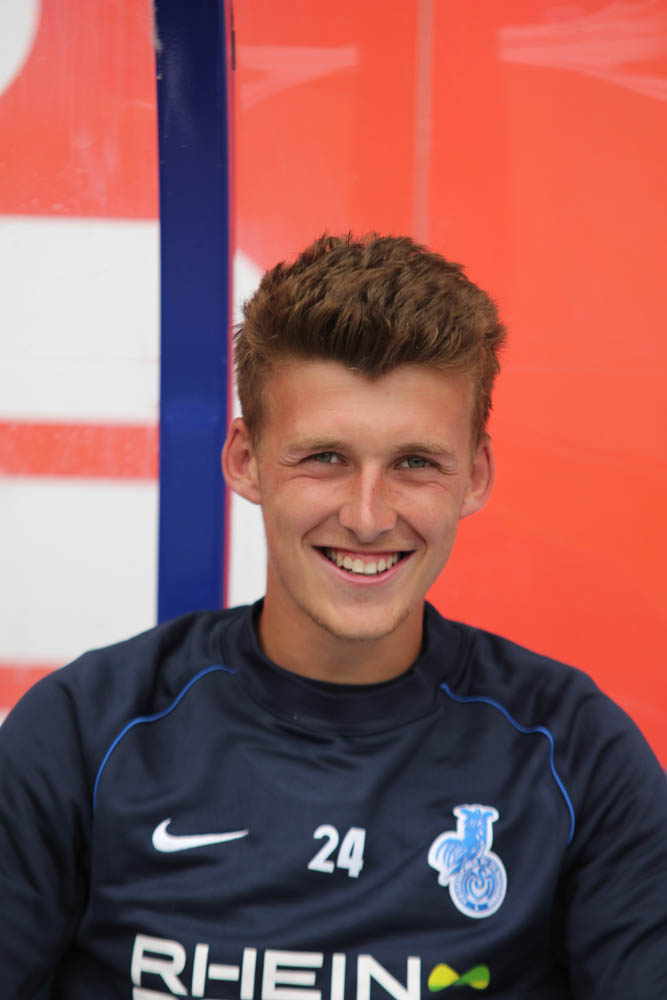
- Julien Rybacki in 2013

Personal information
- Date of birth: 24 September 1995 (age 31)
- Place of birth: Duisburg, Germany
- Height: 1.80 m (5 ft 11 in)
- Position: Forward

Team information
- Current team: TVD Velbert
- Number: 11

Youth career
- –2003: PSV SF Hamborn
- 2003–2007: MSV Duisburg
- 2008–2009: Hamborn 07
- 2009–2012: MSV Duisburg

Senior career*
Years	Team	Apps	(Gls)
2012–2014	MSV Duisburg	3	(0)
2014–2016	Fortuna Düsseldorf II	47	(2)
2016	SV Rödinghausen	4	(0)
2016–2017	SSVg Velbert	31	(6)
2017–2020	VfB Homberg	46	(13)
2020–	TVD Velbert	5	(0)
- * Club domestic league appearances and goals as of 14 January 2021 (UTC)

Julien Rybacki (born 24 September 1995) is a German footballer currently playing for TVD Velbert.
