= Dominik Reinert =

German footballer

Personal information
- Date of birth: 13 October 1991 (age 35)
- Place of birth: Duisburg, Germany
- Height: 1.78 m (5 ft 10 in)
- Position: Defender

Team information
- Current team: TSV Meerbusch
- Number: 30

Youth career
- –2003: TuRa 88 Duisburg
- 2003–2010: MSV Duisburg

Senior career*
Years	Team	Apps	(Gls)
2010–2014	MSV Duisburg II	113	(6)
2013–2014	MSV Duisburg	1	(0)
2014–2021	Rot-Weiß Oberhausen	173	(6)
2021–	TSV Meerbusch	42	(5)
- * Club domestic league appearances and goals as of 13 November 2022

Dominik Reinert (born 13 October 1991) is a German footballer who plays for TSV Meerbusch.
