= Mohamed Youssouf =

Footballer (born 1988)

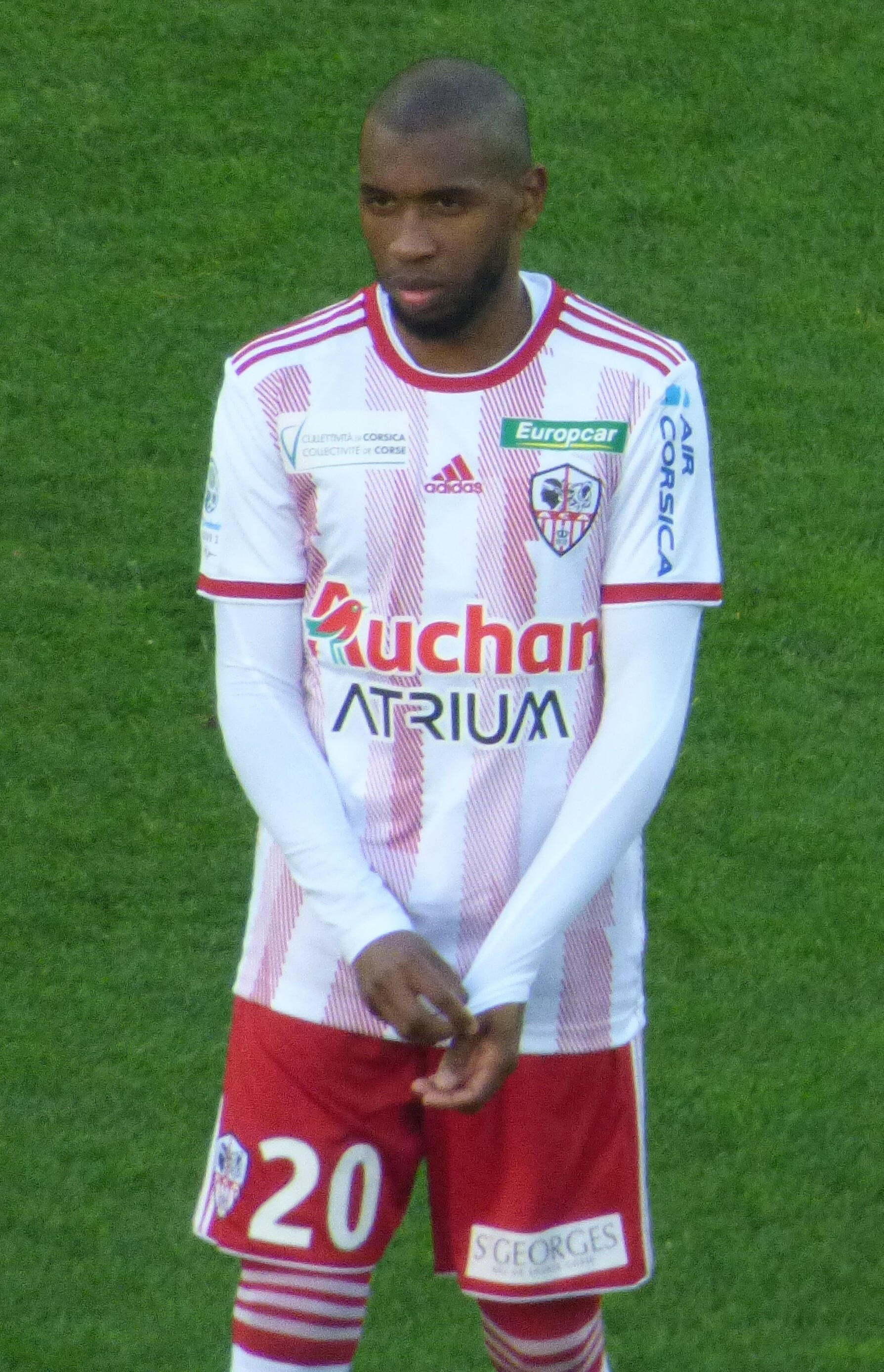
- Youssouf in 2018

Personal information
- Full name: Mohamed Baki Youssouf
- Date of birth: 26 March 1988 (age 38)
- Place of birth: Paris, France
- Height: 1.69 m (5 ft 7 in)
- Position: Midfielder

Team information
- Current team: Chantilly
- Number: 17

Youth career
- 2005–2007: Le Havre

Senior career*
Years	Team	Apps	(Gls)
2007–2011	Le Havre	19	(0)
2010–2011	→ Créteil (loan)	27	(2)
2011–2013	Vannes	69	(15)
2013–2014	Amiens	30	(0)
2014–2015	Ergotelis	27	(6)
2015–2017	Veria	17	(1)
2017–2018	Levadiakos	31	(3)
2018–2025	Ajaccio	158	(1)
2019	Ajaccio B	4	(0)
2026–	Chantilly	6	(0)

International career^{‡}
2011–	Comoros	46	(3)
- * Club domestic league appearances and goals ‡ National team caps and goals as of 09:51, 29 October 2025 (UTC)

Mohamed Baki Youssouf (born 26 March 1988) is a footballer who plays as a midfielder for Championnat National 3 club Chantilly. Born in France, he plays for the Comoros national team.

== Club career ==
Born in Paris, Youssouf began his career in 2005 with Le Havre.

In July 2015, after his contract with Ergotelis expired, Youssouf signed a two-year contract deal with Veria until 30 June 2017. He debuted for the club on 23 August 2015 against PAS Giannina.

On 8 January 2017, Youssouf signed for Super League Greece club Levadiakos for an undisclosed fee.

== International career ==
Youssouf was selected for the Comoros national team at the 2021 Africa Cup of Nations.

== Career statistics ==
Scores and results list Comoros goal tally first, score column indicates score after each Youssouf goal.

List of international goals scored by Mohamed Youssouf
No.	Date	Venue	Opponent	Score	Result	Competition
1	15 November 2011	Estádio do Zimpeto, Maputo, Mozambique	Mozambique	1–3	1–4	2014 FIFA World Cup qualification
2	1 September 2021	Stade Omnisports de Malouzini, Moroni, Comoros	Seychelles	2–0	7–1	Friendly
