= Robert Kurež =

Slovenian footballer (born 1991)

Personal information
- Date of birth: 20 July 1991 (age 35)
- Place of birth: Ptuj, Slovenia
- Height: 1.80 m (5 ft 11 in)
- Position: Forward

Team information
- Current team: Apače

Youth career
- Gerečja vas
- –2007: Aluminij
- 2007–2011: Drava Ptuj

Senior career*
Years	Team	Apps	(Gls)
2007–2011	Drava Ptuj	53	(3)
2011–2014	Aluminij	83	(34)
2014	Ergotelis	2	(0)
2015–2016	Aluminij	28	(9)
2016–2017	Mura	10	(6)
2017	TUS Bad Waltersdorf	10	(3)
2018–2020	TUS Kirchbach	51	(31)
2020–2021	SU Straden	10	(4)
2021–2022	TUS St. Veit am Vogau	24	(9)
2022–2025	Videm pri Ptuju	59	(41)
2025–	Apače		

International career
2006–2007	Slovenia U16	5	(0)
2007–2008	Slovenia U17	4	(0)
2009	Slovenia U19	1	(0)
- * Club domestic league appearances and goals

Robert Kurež (born 20 July 1991) is a Slovenian footballer who plays for Apače as a forward.
