= Sergei Karimov =

Kazakh footballer (1986–2019)

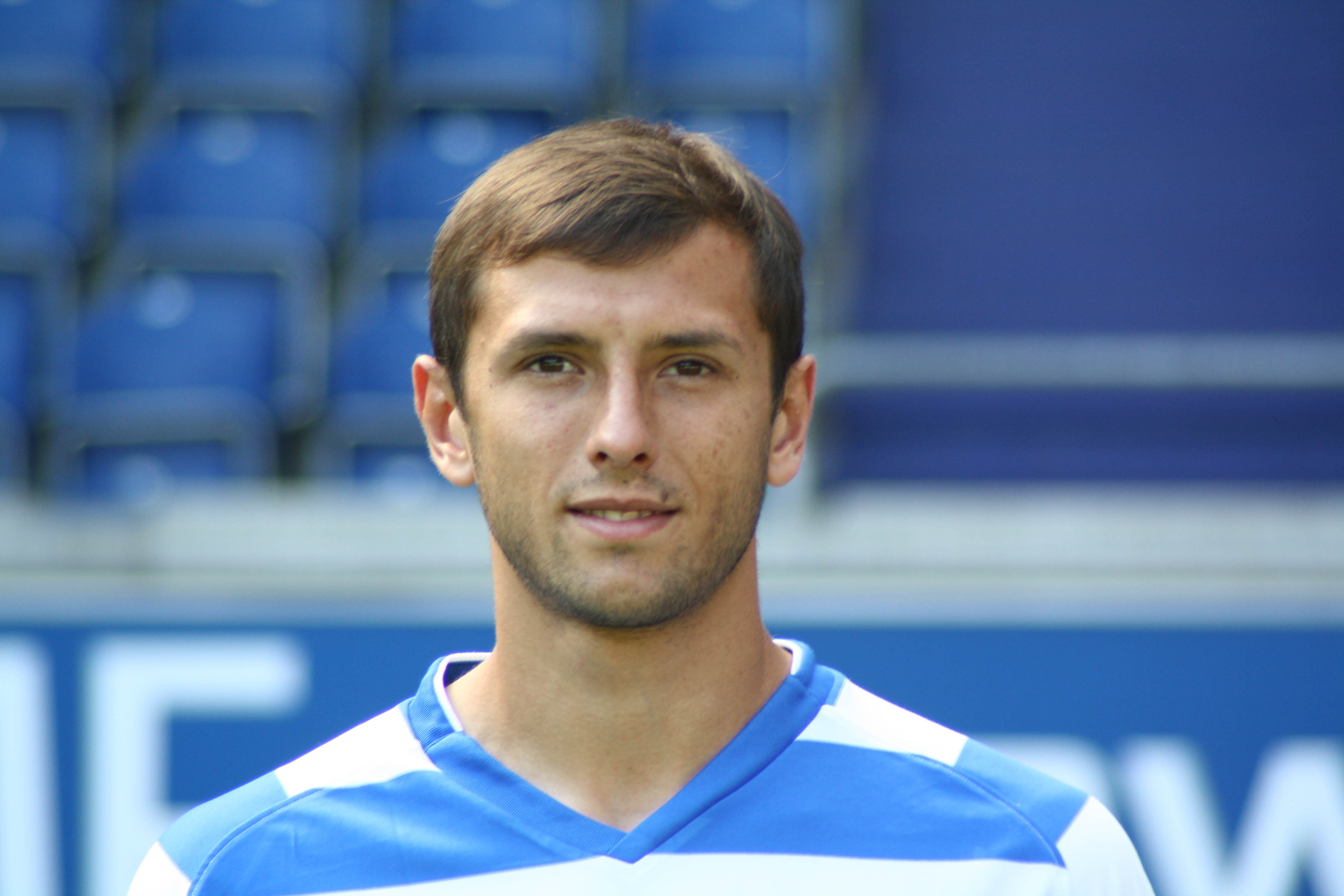
- Karimov with MSV Duisburg in 2011

Personal information
- Date of birth: 21 December 1986
- Place of birth: Saran, Soviet Union
- Date of death: 24 December 2019 (aged 33)
- Height: 1.80 m (5 ft 11 in)
- Position: Left back

Youth career
- SSV Velstove
- –2000: SSV Vorsfelde
- 2000–2006: VfL Wolfsburg

Senior career*
Years	Team	Apps	(Gls)
2006–2011	VfL Wolfsburg II	118	(5)
2007–2011	VfL Wolfsburg	5	(0)
2011–2012	MSV Duisburg	2	(0)
2011–2013	MSV Duisburg II	2	(0)
2014	Lupo Martini Wolfsburg	1	(1)
Total		128	(6)

International career
2010	Kazakhstan	1	(0)
- * Club domestic league appearances and goals

Sergei Karimov (German: Sergej Karimow, Russian: Сергей Каримов; 21 December 1986 – 24 December 2019) was a Kazakh former professional footballer who played as a left back.

== Personal life ==
Karimov was of German descent on his mother's side and Russian on his father's side. He was born in the present-day city of Saran, Kazakhstan, but grew up in Wolfsburg.

He died on 24 December 2019 at the age of 33.

== Club career ==
In the 2005–06 season, Karimov began playing for the VfL Wolfsburg reserve side, which played in Oberliga Nord. The following season, he had appeared for the side on 19 occasions, now playing in Regionalliga Nord, before manager Bernd Hollerbach recommended him to Felix Magath's senior team.

On 8 December 2007, Karimov made his first Bundesliga appearance against VfB Stuttgart. On 30 January 2008, he played in a German Cup round of 16 match against Schalke 04. He scored a 90th-minute equaliser, before scoring the decider in the penalty shootout. Karimov subsequently signed a professional contract with Wolfsburg until 2010 and was put to the reserve team in summer 2009.

== International career ==
In February 2008, the Football Federation of Kazakhstan made an official invitation to Karimov to play for the national team. The player's final decision was to be made in the summer, after the season's finish. On 11 August 2010, Karimov made his first appearance in a 3–1 victory over Oman.
