= Kevin Grund =

German footballer

Personal information
- Date of birth: 14 August 1987 (age 39)
- Place of birth: Oberhausen, West Germany
- Height: 1.75 m (5 ft 9 in)
- Positions: Defender; midfielder

Team information
- Current team: 1. FC Bocholt
- Number: 33

Youth career
- 1994–1996: Sportfreunde Königshardt 1930
- 1996–2006: MSV Duisburg

Senior career*
Years	Team	Apps	(Gls)
2006–2011	MSV Duisburg II	89	(9)
2009–2011	MSV Duisburg	3	(0)
2011–2021	Rot-Weiss Essen	276	(21)
2021–	1. FC Bocholt	42	(3)
- * Club domestic league appearances and goals as of 12 November 2022

Kevin Grund (born 14 August 1987) is a German footballer who plays for 1. FC Bocholt.

Grund made his full debut on 15 March 2010 in a 2. Bundesliga match against TSV 1860 München.

With Rot-Weiss Essen Grund won the Lower Rhine Cup in 2012, 2015 and 2016.
