= Markus Bollmann =

German footballer

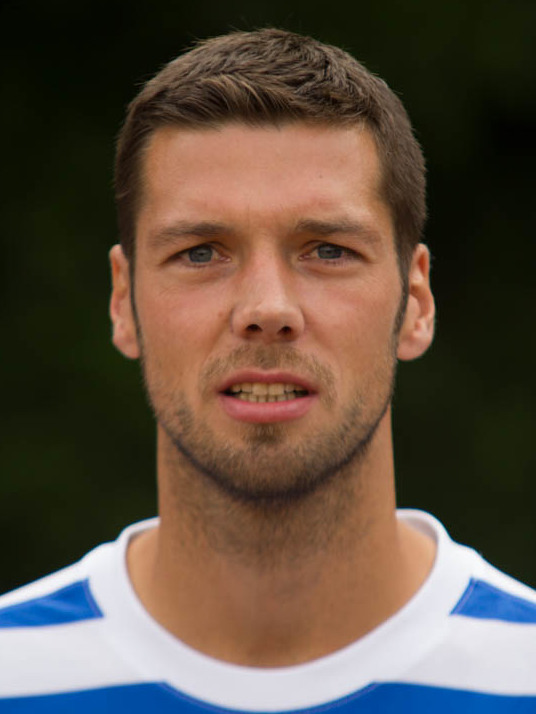
- Markus Bollmann in 2013

Personal information
- Date of birth: 6 January 1981 (age 45)
- Place of birth: Beckum, West Germany
- Height: 1.90 m (6 ft 3 in)
- Position: Defender

Team information
- Current team: SC Wiedenbrück
- Number: 15

Youth career
- Hammer SpVg
- –2000: SpVgg Beckum

Senior career*
Years	Team	Apps	(Gls)
2000–2006	SC Paderborn 07	142	(4)
2006–2011	Arminia Bielefeld	95	(2)
2007	Arminia Bielefeld II	1	(0)
2011–2014	MSV Duisburg	46	(3)
2012–2013	MSV Duisburg II	3	(0)
2014–2016	SC Wiedenbrück	20	(0)
Total		307	(9)
- * Club domestic league appearances and goals

Markus Bollmann (born 6 January 1981) is a German former footballer.

== Career ==
In the 2000–01 season, Bollmann was transferred from SpVgg Beckum to SC Paderborn 07. With his club, he was promoted to the 2. Bundesliga. Later in the summer of 2006, he joined Arminia Bielefeld. After a period of settling in, he was regularly capped in the second half of the 2006–07 season, with the result that in May 2009 his contract was prolonged to 2012.

== Private life ==
Bollmann is married to his wife Kristina. In 2008, their common son was born. His brother Maik Bollmann (*1991) plays for the Hammer SpVg in the Oberliga Westfalen.
