= Athanasios Tsourakis =

Greek footballer

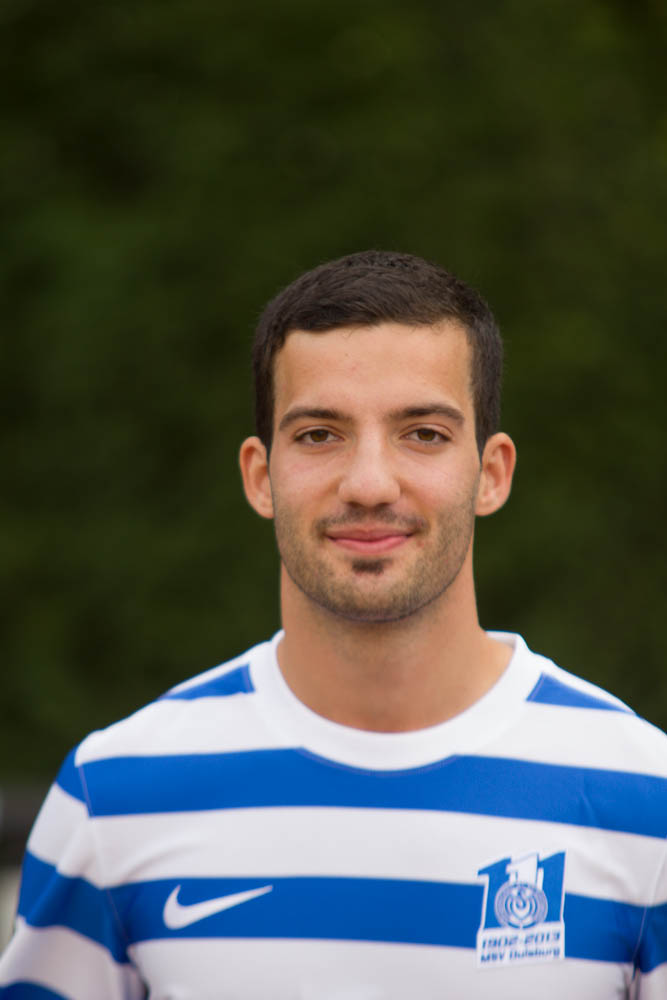
- Tsourakis in 2013

Personal information
- Date of birth: 12 May 1990 (age 36)
- Place of birth: Alexandroupoli, Greece
- Height: 1.68 m (5 ft 6 in)
- Position: Midfielder

Youth career
- TSV Weilheim
- –2008: VfB Stuttgart
- 2008–2009: MSV Duisburg

Senior career*
Years	Team	Apps	(Gls)
2009–2011	MSV Duisburg II	38	(3)
2011	Borea Dresden	4	(1)
2011–2012	TuRU Düsseldorf	22	(1)
2012–2013	MSV Duisburg II	27	(5)
2013–2014	MSV Duisburg	20	(2)
2014–2017	Platanias	37	(2)
2017–2020	Schwarz-Weiß Essen	90	(21)
2020–2023	VfB Speldorf		
- * Club domestic league appearances and goals

Athanasios Tsourakis (born 12 May 1990) is a Greek former professional footballer who played as a midfielder. He retired in the summer 2023.
