= 2016–17 MSV Duisburg season =

MSV Duisburg
2016–17 season
- Manager: Iliya Gruev
- 3. Liga: 1st
- DFB-Pokal: First round
- Lower Rhine Cup: Winners
- Top goalscorer: League: Kingsley Onuegbu (11); All: Kingsley Onuegbu (17)
- Highest home attendance: 24,182 (vs Zwickau, 20 May 2017)
- Lowest home attendance: 10,443 (vs VfR Aalen, 26 November 2016)
- Average home league attendance: 14,176
Home colours	Away colours	Third colours

The 2016–17 MSV Duisburg season was the 117th season in the club's football history. In 2016–17 the club played in the 3. Liga, the third tier of German football after being relegated.

== Team ==
As of 31 August 2016

Note: Flags indicate national team as defined under FIFA eligibility rules; some limited exceptions apply. Players may hold more than one non-FIFA nationality.

No.	Pos.	Nation	Player
1	GK	NED	Mark Flekken
2	MF	USA	Mael Corboz
3	DF	TUN	Enis Hajri
4	DF	GER	Dustin Bomheuer
5	DF	BIH	Branimir Bajić (captain)
6	MF	GER	Martin Dausch
7	MF	GER	Andreas Wiegel
8	FW	GER	Thomas Bröker
9	FW	GER	Simon Brandstetter
10	FW	NGA	Kingsley Onuegbu
11	FW	RUS	Stanislav Iljutcenko
13	MF	BIH	Zlatko Janjić
14	MF	GER	Tim Albutat

No.	Pos.	Nation	Player
16	DF	GER	Fabio Leutenecker
17	DF	GER	Kevin Wolze (vice-captain)
18	DF	GER	Thomas Blomeyer
19	MF	GER	Nico Klotz
22	GK	LBN	Daniel Zeaiter
23	MF	GER	Fabian Schnellhardt
24	MF	GER	Mohamed Cissé
25	MF	GER	Barış Özbek
26	MF	GER	Ahmet Engin
27	DF	GER	Dan-Patrick Poggenberg
29	MF	AZE	Tuğrul Erat
30	GK	GER	Marcel Lenz

== Transfers ==
=== In ===
No.	Pos.	Nat.	Name	Age	EU	Moving from	Type	Transfer window	Ends	Transfer fee	Source
1	GK	(Netherlands)	Mark Flekken	23	EU	SpVgg Greuther Fürth (Germany)	Signing	Summer	2019	Free	MSV Duisburg
2	MF	(United States)	Mael Corboz	21	Non-EU	(United States) Wilmington Hammerheads	Signing	Summer	2018	Free	MSV Duisburg
14	MF	(Germany)	Tim Albutat	24	EU	SC Freiburg (Germany)	Signing	Summer	2019	Free	MSV Duisburg
16	DF	(Germany)	Fabio Leutenecker	26	EU	Stuttgarter Kickers (Germany)	Signing	Summer	2018	Free	MSV Duisburg
18	DF	(Germany)	Thomas Blomeyer	20	EU	FC Ingolstadt (Germany)	Signing	Summer	2018	Free	Kicker.de
22	GK	(Germany)	Daniel Zeaiter	21	EU	Mainz 05 (Germany)	Signing	Summer	2018	Free	MSV Duisburg
24	MF	(Germany)	Mohamed Cissé	18	EU	MSV Duisburg II	Promoted	Summer	2017		MSV Duisburg
29	MF	(Azerbaijan)	Tuğrul Erat	24	EU	Fortuna Düsseldorf (Germany)	Signing	Summer	2018	Free	MSV Duisburg

=== Out ===
No.	Pos.	Nat.	Name	Age	EU	Moving to	Type	Transfer window	Transfer fee	Source
2	DF	(Germany)	Matthias Kühne	28	EU	Carl Zeiss Jena (Germany)	End of contract	Summer	Free	Carl Zeiss Jena
15	FW	(Nigeria)	Victor Obinna	29	Non-EU	Darmstadt 98 (Germany)	End of contract	Summer	Free	SV Darmstadt 98
20	MF	(Germany)	Dennis Grote	29	EU	Chemnitzer FC (Germany)	End of contract	Summer	Free	Chemnitzer FC
21	DF	(Venezuela)	Rolf Feltscher	25	Non-EU	(Spain) Getafe	End of contract	Summer	Free	Getafe CF
22	GK	(Germany)	Maurice Schumacher	22	EU	KFC Uerdingen (Germany)	End of contract	Summer	Free	Reviersprot
23	MF	(Australia)	James Holland	27	Non-EU	(Australia) Adelaide United	End of contract	Summer	Free	Adelaide United FC
24	MF	(Germany)	Dominik Behr	25	EU	Viktoria Arnoldsweiler	End of contract	Summer	Free	DerWesten
25	DF	(Germany)	Thomas Meißner	25	EU	(Netherlands) ADO Den Haag	End of contract	Summer	Free	ADO Den Haag
28	DF	(Germany)	Steffen Bohl	32	EU	SV Elversberg (Germany)	End of contract	Summer	Free	SV Elversberg
33	FW	(Germany)	Kevin Scheidhauer	24	EU	Schalke 04 II (Germany)	End of contract	Summer	Free	FC Schalke 04
36	MF	(Georgia (country))	Giorgi Chanturia	23	EU	(Russia) Ural Yekaterinburg	End of contract	Summer	Free	Ural Yekaterinburg
39	GK	(Senegal)	Timothy Dieng	21	Non-EU	(England) Queens Park Rangers	End of contract	Summer	Free	MSV Duisburg

== Friendlies ==
26 June 2016 1	TuSpo Huckingen (Germany)	0–14	(Germany) MSV Duisburg	Duisburg
15:00		Report	Onuegbu 14', 29'; Erat 17', 66'; Bröker 25', 32'; Bajić 26' (pen.); Blomeyer 37'; Iljutcenko 49', 60', 80'; Janjić 58', 81'; Dausch 72'	Attendance: 2,028; Referee: Jens Laux

1 July 2016 2	Teutonia St. Tönis (Germany)	0–15	(Germany) MSV Duisburg	Tönisvorst
18:00		Report	Brandstetter 10', 20', 26', 29', 42'; Engin 32', 47'; Iljutcenko 59', 81', 84'; Erat 68', 88'; Dausch 73'; Onuegbu 74', 80' (pen.)	Referee: Jan Oberdörster

6 July 2016 3	FC Valenciennes (France)	1–4	(Germany) MSV Duisburg	St. Johann
18:15	Ndao 53'	Report	Onuegbu 35'; Engin 59', 60', 81'

9 July 2016 4	Wacker Innsbruck (Austria)	1–1	(Germany) MSV Duisburg	St. Johann
16:00	Gründler 67'	Report	Özbek 62'

13 July 2016 5	FC Vysočina Jihlava (Czech Republic)	1–2	(Germany) MSV Duisburg	St. Johann
17:00	Dvořák 45'	Report	Brandstetter 68'; Erat 82'

17 July 2016 6	MSV Duisburg (Germany)	0–0 (5–4 p)	(Germany) Eintracht Frankfurt	Duisburg
14:00		Report		Stadium: MSV-Arena; Attendance: 5,026; Referee: Sven Waschitzki
	Penalties
	Albutat (penalty missed); Onuegbu (penalty scored); Wolze (penalty scored); Brandstetter (penalty scored); Bajić (penalty scored); Schnellhardt (penalty scored)		(penalty scored) Meier; (penalty scored) Huszti; (penalty scored) Hasebe; (penalty scored) Rebić; (penalty scored) Blum; (penalty scored) Flum

17 July 2016 7	MSV Duisburg (Germany)	2–2 (2–3 p)	(Germany) Hertha BSC	Duisburg
16:50	Janjić 17', 32'	Report	Schieber 38', 44'	Stadium: MSV-Arena; Attendance: 5,026
	Penalties
	Janjić (penalty scored); Dausch (penalty missed); Wolze (penalty scored); Wiegel (penalty missed); Özbek (penalty missed)		(penalty scored) Darida; (penalty scored) Hegeler; (penalty scored) Kohls; (penalty missed) Stark

22 July 2016 8	Borussia Mönchengladbach II (Germany)	0–7	(Germany) MSV Duisburg	Mönchengladbach
17:00		Report	Wiegel 27', 65'; Iljutcenko 31'; Janjić 50'; Bröker 67', 76'; Engin 87'	Stadium: Grenzlandstadion; Attendance: 322; Referee: Sven Heinrichs

6 January 2017 9	MSV Duisburg (Germany)	5–0	(Germany) SV Straelen	Duisburg
18:30	Brandstetter 8'; Engin 14'; Onuegbu 35'; Janjić 77'; Iljutcenko 90'	Report		Referee: Martin Ulankiewicz

10 January 2017 10	MSV Duisburg (Germany)	13–0	(Germany) Viktoria Buchholz	Duisburg
18:30	Onuegbu 9'; Janjić 23' (pen.); Schnellhardt 31'; Bröker 37'; Brandstetter 48', 79', 87'; Iljutcenko 66', 69', 86'; Albutat 74'; Wiegel 80', 83' (pen.)	Report		Referee: Kevin Domnick

15 January 2017 11	MSV Duisburg (Germany)	0–0	(Germany) VfB Stuttgart	Lagos
14:00		Report

17 January 2017 12	MSV Duisburg (Germany)	3–0	(Germany) VfB Lübeck	Albufeira
16:00	Iljutcenko 18'; Brandstetter 33'; Janjić 79' (pen.)	Report		Stadium: Estadio Arsénio Catuna

8 February 2017 13	MSV Duisburg (Germany)	12–0	(Germany) Hamborn 07	Duisburg
19:00	Dausch 1', 7', 37'; Erat 18', 41'; Schäfer 23' (o.g.); Iljutcenko 26', 40'; Leutenecker 35'; Özbek 66', 83'; Bröker 70'	Report		Referee: Tim Pelzer

26 March 2017 14	MSV Duisburg (Germany)	0–4	Japan	Duisburg
11:00		Report	Ogawa 37', 70', ?'; Endo 59'

== Results ==
Times from 29 July to 29 October 2016 and from 26 March to 20 May 2017 are UTC+2, from 30 October 2016 to 25 March 2017 UTC+1.

=== 3. Liga ===
==== League table ====
Pos	Team	Pld	W	D	L	GF	GA	GD	Pts	Promotion, qualification or relegation
1	MSV Duisburg (C, P)	38	18	14	6	52	32	+20	68	Promotion to 2. Bundesliga and qualification for DFB-Pokal
2	Holstein Kiel (P)	38	18	13	7	59	25	+34	67	Promotion to 2. Bundesliga and qualification for DFB-Pokal
3	Jahn Regensburg (O, P)	38	18	9	11	62	50	+12	63	Qualification for promotion play-offs and DFB-Pokal
4	1. FC Magdeburg	38	16	13	9	53	36	+17	61	Qualification for DFB-Pokal
5	FSV Zwickau	38	16	8	14	47	54	−7	56	

Source: DFB
Rules for classification: 1) Points; 2) Goal difference; 3) Goals scored
(C) Champions; (O) Play-off winners; (P) Promoted

==== Results summary ====
Overall								Home						Away					
Pld	W	D	L	GF	GA	GD	Pts	W	D	L	GF	GA	GD	W	D	L	GF	GA	GD
38	18	14	6	52	32	+20	68	10	7	2	31	16	+15	8	7	4	21	16	+5

Last updated: 20 May 2017.
Source: dfb.de

==== Result round by round ====
Round	1	2	3	4	5	6	7	8	9	10	11	12	13	14	15	16	17	18	19	20	21	22	23	24	25	26	27	28	29	30	31	32	33	34	35	36	37	38
Ground	H	A	A	H	A	H	A	H	A	H	A	H	A	H	A	H	A	H	A	A	H	H	A	H	A	H	A	H	A	H	A	H	A	H	A	H	A	H
Result	W	D	D	W	W	W	L	D	W	W	W	L	D	D	D	D	W	W	D	W	D	W	W	D	D	L	L	W	W	D	L	W	D	W	L	D	W	W
Position	6	6	6	3	1	1	3	2	1	1	1	1	1	1	1	1	1	1	1	1	1	1	1	1	1	1	1	1	1	1	1	1	1	1	1	1	1	1

Updated to match(es) played on 20 May 2017. Source: dfb.de
A = Away; H = Home; W = Win; D = Draw; L = Loss

==== Matches ====
29 July 2016 1	MSV Duisburg	1–0	SC Paderborn	Duisburg
20:30	Janjić 56'	Report		Stadium: MSV-Arena; Attendance: 16,476; Referee: Christian Dingert

7 August 2016 2	VfL Osnabrück	1–1	MSV Duisburg	Osnabrück
14:00	Savran 48'	Report	Flekken 90+4'	Stadium: Stadion an der Bremer Brücke; Attendance: 11,573; Referee: Patrick Ittrich

10 August 2016 3	Preußen Münster	1–1	MSV Duisburg	Münster
19:00	Bischoff 74' (pen.)	Report	Bomheuer 19'	Stadium: Preußenstadion; Attendance: 9,544; Referee: Matthias Jöllenbeck

13 August 2016 4	MSV Duisburg	4–0	Mainz 05 II	Duisburg
14:00	Janjić 13'; Onuegbu 57', 69'; Iljutcenko 70'	Report		Stadium: MSV-Arena; Attendance: 11,577; Referee: Christof Günsch

26 August 2016 5	1. FC Magdeburg	1–2	MSV Duisburg	Magdeburg
18:30	Beck 12'	Report	Bajić 20'; Erat 40'	Stadium: MDCC-Arena; Attendance: 15,718; Referee: Bastian Dankert

10 September 2016 6	MSV Duisburg	1–0	Werder Bremen II	Duisburg
14:00	Erat 22'	Report		Stadium: MSV-Arena; Attendance: 12,452; Referee: Nicolas Winter

16 September 2016 7	Wehen Wiesbaden	3–0	MSV Duisburg	Wiesbaden
19:00	Ruprecht 29' (pen.); Mvibudulu 63'; Blacha 86'	Report		Stadium: BRITA-Arena; Attendance: 3,052; Referee: Jochen Drees

20 September 2016 8	MSV Duisburg	0–0	Holstein Kiel	Duisburg
19:00		Report		Stadium: MSV-Arena; Attendance: 11,642; Referee: Alexander Sather

25 September 2016 9	Rot-Weiß Erfurt	0–1	MSV Duisburg	Erfurt
14:00		Report	Brandstetter 51'	Stadium: Steigerwaldstadion; Attendance: 4,981; Referee: Benedikt Kempkes

1 October 2016 10	MSV Duisburg	1–0	Chemnitzer FC	Duisburg
14:00	Brandstetter 7'	Report		Stadium: MSV-Arena; Attendance: 12,151; Referee: Wolfgang Stark

15 October 2016 11	Jahn Regensburg	1–2	MSV Duisburg	Regensburg
14:00	George 52'	Report	Albutat 9'; Iljutcenko 79'	Stadium: Continental Arena; Attendance: 7,786; Referee: Robert Kampka

22 October 2016 12	MSV Duisburg	0–1	Hansa Rostock	Duisburg
14:00		Report	Ziemer 87'	Stadium: MSV-Arena; Attendance: 15,610; Referee: Martin Petersen

29 October 2016 13	Sonnenhof Großaspach	0–0	MSV Duisburg	Aspach
14:00		Report		Stadium: Mechatronik Arena; Attendance: 2,400; Referee: Christof Günsch

5 November 2016 14	MSV Duisburg	0–0	Hallescher FC	Duisburg
14:00		Report		Stadium: MSV-Arena; Attendance: 12,568; Referee: Tobias Reichel

19 November 2016 15	FSV Frankfurt	0–0	MSV Duisburg	Frankfurt
14:00		Report		Stadium: Stadion am Bornheimer Hang; Attendance: 4,639; Referee: Frank Willenborg

26 November 2016 16	MSV Duisburg	2–2	VfR Aalen	Duisburg
14:00	Onuegbu 33'; Janjić 77'	Report	Morys 62'; Kartalis 71'	Stadium: MSV-Arena; Attendance: 10,443; Referee: Arne Aarnink

4 December 2016 17	Sportfreunde Lotte	0–2	MSV Duisburg	Lotte
14:00		Report	Albutat 9'; Janjić 52'	Stadium: Sportpark am Lotter Kreuz; Attendance: 4,038; Referee: Robert Schröder

10 December 2016 18	MSV Duisburg	2–0	Fortuna Köln	Duisburg
14:00	Schnellhardt 21'; Iljutcenko 87'	Report		Stadium: MSV-Arena; Attendance: 13,315; Referee: Daniel Schlager

18 December 2016 19	FSV Zwickau	1–1	MSV Duisburg	Zwickau
14:00	König 34'	Report	Janjić 16'	Stadium: Stadion Zwickau; Attendance: 5,268; Referee: Steffen Brütting

28 January 2017 20	SC Paderborn	0–1	MSV Duisburg	Paderborn
14:00		Report	Engin 49'	Stadium: Benteler Arena; Attendance: 7,731; Referee: Marcel Schütz

4 February 2017 21	MSV Duisburg	2–2	VfL Osnabrück	Duisburg
14:00	Bomheuer 55'; Onuegbu 72'	Report	Wriedt 2'; Heider 90+2'	Stadium: MSV-Arena; Attendance: 17,745; Referee: Florian Badstübner

12 February 2017 22	MSV Duisburg	3–2	Preußen Münster	Duisburg
14:00	Schnellhardt 38', 90+6'; Bomheuer 87'	Report	Kobylanski 46', 71'	Stadium: MSV-Arena; Attendance: 14,345; Referee: Tim Skorczyk

17 February 2017 23	Mainz 05 II	0–2	MSV Duisburg	Mainz
19:00		Report	Bomheuer 30'; Onuegbu 33'	Stadium: Stadion am Bruchweg; Attendance: 1,898; Referee: Steffen Brütting

24 February 2017 24	MSV Duisburg	0–0	1. FC Magdeburg	Duisburg
18:30		Report		Stadium: MSV-Arena; Attendance: 18,164; Referee: Benjamin Cortus

5 March 2017 25	Werder Bremen II	0–0	MSV Duisburg	Bremen
14:00		Report		Stadium: Weserstadion Platz 11; Attendance: 2,510; Referee: Benedikt Kempkes

11 March 2017 26	MSV Duisburg	0–1	Wehen Wiesbaden	Duisburg
14:00		Report	Blacha 52'	Stadium: MSV-Arena; Attendance: 12,164; Referee: Justus Zorn

14 March 2017 27	Holstein Kiel	2–0	MSV Duisburg	Kiel
19:00	Ducksch 13'; Lenz 69'	Report		Stadium: Holstein-Stadion; Attendance: 5,745; Referee: Sören Storks

18 March 2017 28	MSV Duisburg	3–2	Rot-Weiß Erfurt	Duisburg
14:00	Iljutcenko 18', 24'; Bajić 68' (pen.)	Report	Uzan 14'; Erb 83' (pen.)	Stadium: MSV-Arena; Attendance: 11,087; Referee: Patrick Schult

25 March 2017 29	Chemnitzer FC	2–3	MSV Duisburg	Chemnitz
14:00	Türpitz 41', 52'	Report	Wiegel 23'; Brandstetter 68'; Onuegbu 74'	Stadium: Stadion an der Gellertstraße; Attendance: 6,841; Referee: Frank Willenborg

1 April 2017 30	MSV Duisburg	1–1	Jahn Regensburg	Duisburg
14:00	Iljutcenko 35'	Report	Geipl 57' (pen.)	Stadium: MSV-Arena; Attendance: 12,345; Referee: Robert Kampka

5 April 2017 31	Hansa Rostock	1–0	MSV Duisburg	Rostock
19:00	Bischoff 35'	Report		Stadium: Ostseestadion; Attendance: 9,000; Referee: Tobias Reichel

8 April 2017 32	MSV Duisburg	2–1	Sonnenhof Großaspach	Duisburg
14:00	Iljutcenko 59', 80'	Report	Binakaj 46'	Stadium: MSV-Arena; Attendance: 13,116; Referee: Patrick Ittrich

15 April 2017 33	Hallescher FC	1–1	MSV Duisburg	Halle
14:00	Ajani 60'	Report	Janjić 46'	Stadium: Erdgas Sportpark; Attendance: 6,381; Referee: Patrick Alt

22 April 2017 34	MSV Duisburg	3–2	FSV Frankfurt	Duisburg
14:00	Onuegbu 53'; Streker 57' (o.g.); Hajri 61'	Report	Kader 12'; Bahn 20'	Stadium: MSV-Arena; Attendance: 12,839; Referee: Benjamin Brand

29 April 2017 35	VfR Aalen	2–1	MSV Duisburg	Aalen
14:00	Wegkamp 7'; Morys 46'	Report	Onuegbu 71'	Stadium: Städtisches Waldstadion; Attendance: 5,236; Referee: Frank Willenborg

6 May 2017 36	MSV Duisburg	1–1	Sportfreunde Lotte	Duisburg
14:00	Onuegbu 90+1'	Report	Sané 70'	Stadium: MSV-Arena; Attendance: 17,133; Referee: Tobias Fritsch

13 May 2017 37	Fortuna Köln	0–3	MSV Duisburg	Cologne
13:30		Report	Wiegel 45+1'; Onuegbu 72'; Brandstetter 89'	Stadium: Südstadion; Attendance: 8,314; Referee: Michael Bacher

20 May 2017 38	MSV Duisburg	5–1	FSV Zwickau	Duisburg
13:30	Wiegel 19', 44'; Hajri 66'; Onuegbu 67'; Wolze 89'	Report	Wolf 16'	Stadium: MSV-Arena; Attendance: 24,182; Referee: Bibiana Steinhaus

=== DFB-Pokal ===
21 August 2016 Round 1	MSV Duisburg	1–2 (a.e.t.)	Union Berlin	Duisburg
15:30	Iljutcenko 67'	Report	Quaner 62'; Schnellhardt 95' (o.g.)	Stadium: MSV-Arena; Attendance: 14,209; Referee: Marco Fritz

=== Lower Rhine Cup ===
2 September 2016 Round 1	Post SV Solingen	0–7	MSV Duisburg	Solingen
19:00		Report	Brandstetter 18'; Dausch 30'; Onuegbu 35', 50', 66', 79'; Wiegel 59'	Stadium: Jahnkampfbahn Wald; Attendance: 1,902; Referee: Florian Kötter

28 September 2016 Round 2	Rather SV	1–5	MSV Duisburg	Duisburg
19:00	Ziegler 88'	Report	Iljutcenko 16'; Bröker 58'; Hajri 66'; Onuegbu 71', 90'	Stadium: PCC-Stadion; Attendance: 1,300; Referee: Alexander Busse

9 October 2016 Round 3	KFC Uerdingen	0–1	MSV Duisburg	Uerdingen
15:00		Report	Brandstetter 89'	Stadium: Grotenburg-Stadion; Attendance: 7,320; Referee: Martin Ulankiewicz

13 November 2016 Quarterfinals	TuRU Düsseldorf	0–6	MSV Duisburg	Düsseldorf
15:00		Report	Erat 19'; Iljutcenko 38'; Schnellhardt 58'; Onuegbu 65'; Engin 85'; Brandstetter 89'	Stadium: Paul-Janes-Stadion; Attendance: 880; Referee: Sven Waschitzki

2 May 2017 Semifinals	Rot-Weiß Oberhausen	0–3	MSV Duisburg	Oberhausen
19:30		Report	Iljutcenko 3', 47'; Brandstetter 39'	Stadium: Niederrheinstadion; Attendance: 7,509; Referee: Guido Winkmann

25 May 2017 Final	Rot-Weiss Essen	0–2	MSV Duisburg	Essen
17:00		Report	Brandstetter 31'; Wolze 48'	Stadium: Stadion Essen; Attendance: 17,000; Referee: Sven Heinrichs

== Statistics ==
=== Squad statistics ===
No.	Pos	Nat	Player	Total		3. Liga		DFB-Pokal		Lower Rhine Cup	
No.	Pos	Nat	Player	Apps	Goals	Apps	Goals	Apps	Goals	Apps	Goals
1	GK	(Netherlands) NED	Mark Flekken	40	1	37	1	1	0	2	0
2	MF	(United States) USA	Mael Corboz	5	0	0	0	0	0	5	0
3	DF	(Tunisia) TUN	Enis Hajri	25	3	20	2	1	0	4	1
4	DF	(Germany) GER	Dustin Bomheuer	41	4	36	4	1	0	4	0
5	DF	(Bosnia and Herzegovina) BIH	Branimir Bajić	30	2	29	2	0	0	1	0
6	MF	(Germany) GER	Martin Dausch	24	1	18	0	1	0	5	1
7	MF	(Germany) GER	Andreas Wiegel	39	5	35	4	1	0	3	1
8	FW	(Germany) GER	Thomas Bröker	19	1	16	0	1	0	2	1
9	FW	(Germany) GER	Simon Brandstetter	37	9	31	4	1	0	5	5
10	FW	(Nigeria) NGA	Kingsley Onuegbu	39	18	33	11	1	0	5	7
11	FW	(Russia) RUS	Stanislav Iljutcenko	39	13	33	8	1	1	5	4
13	MF	(Bosnia and Herzegovina) BIH	Zlatko Janjić	38	6	37	6	0	0	1	0
14	MF	(Germany) GER	Tim Albutat	36	2	32	2	1	0	3	0
15	MF	(Germany) GER	Lukas Daschner	3	0	1	0	0	0	2	0
16	DF	(Germany) GER	Fabio Leutenecker	14	0	10	0	0	0	4	0
17	DF	(Germany) GER	Kevin Wolze	33	2	28	1	1	0	4	1
18	MF	(Germany) GER	Thomas Blomeyer	13	0	9	0	0	0	4	0
19	MF	(Germany) GER	Nico Klotz	26	0	23	0	1	0	2	0
21	DF	(Germany) GER	Maximilian Dick	1	0	0	0	0	0	1	0
22	GK	(Germany) GER	Daniel Zeaiter	0	0	0	0	0	0	0	0
23	FW	(Germany) GER	Fabian Schnellhardt	38	4	33	3	1	0	4	1
24	MF	(Germany) GER	Mohamed Cissé	2	0	0	0	0	0	2	0
25	MF	(Germany) GER	Barış Özbek	17	0	13	0	1	0	3	0
26	MF	(Germany) GER	Ahmet Engin	33	2	28	1	0	0	5	1
27	DF	(Germany) GER	Dan-Patrick Poggenberg	4	0	4	0	0	0	0	0
29	MF	(Azerbaijan) AZE	Tuğrul Erat	27	3	22	2	0	0	5	1
30	GK	(Germany) GER	Marcel Lenz	5	0	1	0	0	0	4	0

=== Goals ===
Rank	Player	Position	3. Liga	DFB-Pokal	Lower Rhine Cup	Total
1	(Nigeria) Kingsley Onuegbu	FW	11	0	7	18
2	(Russia) Stanislav Iljutcenko	FW	8	1	4	13
3	(Germany) Simon Brandstetter	FW	4	0	5	9
4	(Germany) Zlatko Janjić	FW	6	0	0	6
5	(Germany) Andreas Wiegel	MF	4	0	1	5
6	(Germany) Dustin Bomheuer	DF	4	0	0	4
6	(Germany) Fabian Schnellhardt	MF	3	0	1	4
8	(Azerbaijan) Tuğrul Erat	MF	2	0	1	3
8	(Tunisia) Enis Hajri	DF	2	0	1	3
10	(Germany) Tim Albutat	MF	2	0	0	2
10	(Bosnia and Herzegovina) Branimir Bajić	DF	2	0	0	2
10	(Germany) Ahmet Engin	MF	1	0	1	2
10	(Germany) Kevin Wolze	DF	1	0	1	2
14	(Germany) Thomas Bröker	MF	1	0	0	1
14	(Germany) Martin Dausch	MF	0	0	1	1
14	(Netherlands) Mark Flekken	GK	1	0	0	1
Own goals			1	0	0	1
Total			52	1	24	77

=== Clean sheets ===
Rank	Name	3. Liga	DFB-Pokal	Lower Rhine Cup	Total
1	(Netherlands) Mark Flekken	15	0	1	16
2	(Germany) Marcel Lenz	1	0	3	4
Total		16	0	4	20

=== Disciplinary record ===
N	P	Nat.	Name	3. Liga			DFB-Pokal			Lower Rhine Cup			Total			Notes
N	P	Nat.	Name	Yellow card	Second yellow card	Red card	Yellow card	Second yellow card	Red card	Yellow card	Second yellow card	Red card	Yellow card	Second yellow card	Red card	Notes
11	FW	(Russia)	Stanislav Iljutcenko	11									11			
14	MF	(Germany)	Tim Albutat	9			1			1			11			
7	MF	(Germany)	Andreas Wiegel	9			1						10			
5	DF	(Bosnia and Herzegovina)	Branimir Bajić	9									9			
23	MF	(Germany)	Fabian Schnellhardt	6		1							6		1	
25	MF	(Germany)	Barış Özbek	4		1				1			5		1	
4	DF	(Germany)	Dustin Bomheuer	4									4			
13	FW	(Bosnia and Herzegovina)	Zlatko Janjić	4									4			
17	DF	(Germany)	Kevin Wolze	2		1				1			3		1	
3	DF	(Tunisia)	Enis Hajri	2						1			3			
1	GK	(Netherlands)	Mark Flekken	2									2			
6	MF	(Germany)	Martin Dausch	2									2			
10	FW	(Nigeria)	Kingsley Onuegbu	2									2			
27	DF	(Germany)	Dan-Patrick Poggenberg	2									2			
2	DF	(United States)	Mael Corboz							1			1			
9	FW	(Germany)	Simon Brandstetter	1									1			
16	DF	(Germany)	Fabio Leutenecker	1									1			
24	MF	(Germany)	Mohamed Cissé							1			1			
26	MF	(Germany)	Ahmet Engin	1									1			
29	MF	(Azerbaijan)	Tuğrul Erat	1									1			

Last updated: 25 May 2017
Source: Matches
Ordered by (red card) , (second yellow card) and (yellow card)
(yellow card) = Number of bookings; (second yellow card) = Number of sending offs after a second yellow card; (red card) = Number of sending offs by a direct red card.
