= 2017–18 MSV Duisburg season =

MSV Duisburg
2017–18 season
- Manager: Iliya Gruev
- 2. Bundesliga: 7th
- DFB-Pokal: First round
- Top goalscorer: League: Borys Tashchy (11); All: Borys Tashchy (11)
- Highest home attendance: 28,000 vs Fortuna Düsseldorf, 11 March 2018)
- Lowest home attendance: 12,017 vs Greuther Fürth, 2 December 2017)
- Average home league attendance: 16,633
Home colours	Away colours	Third colours

The 2017–18 MSV Duisburg season was the 118th season in the club's football history. In 2017–18 the club played in the 2. Bundesliga, the second tier of German football after being promoted.

== Team ==
As of 7 February 2018

Note: Flags indicate national team as defined under FIFA eligibility rules; some limited exceptions apply. Players may hold more than one non-FIFA nationality.

No.	Pos.	Nation	Player
1	GK	NED	Mark Flekken
3	DF	TUN	Enis Hajri
4	DF	GER	Dustin Bomheuer
5	DF	BIH	Branimir Bajić (captain)
6	DF	GER	Gerrit Nauber
7	MF	GER	Andreas Wiegel
10	FW	NGR	Kingsley Onuegbu
11	FW	RUS	Stanislav Iljutcenko
14	MF	GER	Tim Albutat
15	MF	GER	Lukas Daschner
16	MF	GER	Lukas Fröde
17	DF	GER	Kevin Wolze (captain)
18	DF	GER	Thomas Blomeyer

No.	Pos.	Nation	Player
19	MF	GER	Nico Klotz
20	MF	BRA	Cauly Oliveira Souza
21	DF	GER	Pascal Kubina
22	GK	LBN	Daniel Zeaiter
23	MF	GER	Fabian Schnellhardt (vice-captain)
24	FW	UKR	Borys Tashchy
26	MF	GER	Ahmet Engin
27	DF	GER	Dan-Patrick Poggenberg
28	GK	IRI	Daniel Davari
29	MF	AZE	Tuğrul Erat
30	MF	AUT	Christian Gartner
31	DF	GER	Marius Krüger
33	MF	GER	Moritz Stoppelkamp

== Transfers ==
=== In ===
No.	Pos.	Nat.	Name	Age	EU	Moving from	Type	Transfer window	Ends	Transfer fee	Source
6	DF	(Germany)	Gerrit Nauber	25	EU	Sportfreunde Lotte	Signing	Summer	2019		MSV Duisburg
15	MF	(Germany)	Lukas Daschner	18	EU		Promoted	Summer	2020		MSV Duisburg
16	MF	(Germany)	Lukas Fröde	22	EU	Würzburger Kickers	Signing	Summer	2019		MSV Duisburg
20	MF	(Brazil)	Cauly Oliveira Souza	21		Fortuna Köln	Signing	Summer	2020		MSV Duisburg
24	FW	(Ukraine)	Borys Tashchy	23	EU	VfB Stuttgart	Signing	Summer	2019		MSV Duisburg
28	GK	(Iran)	Daniel Davari	29		Arminia Bielefeld	Signing	Summer	2019		MSV Duisburg
31	MF	(Germany)	Marius Krüger	18	EU		Promoted	Summer	2020		MSV Duisburg
33	MF	(Germany)	Moritz Stoppelkamp	30	EU	Karlsruher SC	Signing	Summer	2019		MSV Duisburg
30	MF	(Germany)	Christian Gartner	33	EU	Free agent	Signing	Summer	2019		MSV Duisburg

=== Out ===
No.	Pos.	Nat.	Name	Age	EU	Moving to	Type	Transfer window	Transfer fee	Source
6	MF	(Germany)	Martin Dausch	31	EU	1. FC Saarbrücken	End of contract	Summer	Free	1. FC Saarbrücken
16	DF	(Germany)	Fabio Leutenecker	27	EU	Chemnitzer FC	End of contract	Summer	Free	Chemnitzer FC
24	MF	(Germany)	Mohamed Cissé	19	EU		End of contract	Summer	Free	
30	GK	(Germany)	Marcel Lenz	26	EU	Rot-Weiss Essen	End of contract	Summer	Free	Rot-Weiss Essen
2	MF	(United States)	Mael Corboz	32	Non-EU	SG Wattenscheid 09	Contract terminated	Winter	Free	SG Wattenscheid 09
8	MF	(Germany)	Thomas Bröker	23	EU	Fortuna Köln	Transfer	Winter	Free	SC Fortuna Köln
9	FW	(Germany)	Simon Brandstetter	27	EU	Wehen Wiesbaden	Transfer	Winter	€ 0.1M	SV Wehen Wiesbaden
13	MF	(Bosnia and Herzegovina)	Zlatko Janjić	31	EU	Korona Kielce (Poland)	Transfer		Free	Korona Kielce
25	MF	(Germany)	Barış Özbek	31	EU		Contract terminated			MSV Duisburg

== Friendlies ==
25 June 2017 1	Duisburg City Allstars	1–6	MSV Duisburg	Duisburg
16:00	Koncic 75'	Report	Onuegbu 6', 38'; Daschner 24'; Brandstetter 31'; Iljutcenko 55'; Albutat 86'	Attendance: 1,476

28 June 2017 2	VfB Günnigfeld	0–9	MSV Duisburg	Duisburg
19:00		Report	Brandstetter 3', 12', 32'; Souza 30'; Iljutcenko 45'; Özbek 47'; Onuegbu 55', 67'; Wolze 90'

2 July 2017 3	VfB Homberg	0–4	MSV Duisburg	Homberg
18:00		Report	Wiegel 45'; Wolze 54'; Onuegbu 59' (pen.); Özbek 89'	Stadium: PCC-Stadion; Referee: Robin Braun

8 July 2017 4	Karlsruher SC	2–3	MSV Duisburg	Angerberg
16:30	Fink 41'; Stoll 67'	Report	Onuegbu 6'; Brandstetter 18'; Hajri 53'

11 July 2017 5	Würzburger Kickers	1–1	MSV Duisburg	Wörgl
18:00	Schuppan 20' (pen.)	Report	Brandstetter 32' (pen.)

16 July 2017 6	Rot-Weiß Oberhausen	1–2	MSV Duisburg	Oberhausen
16:00	Gödde 3'	Report	Onuegbu 27'; Hajri 45'	Stadium: Niederrheinstadion; Attendance: 1,016; Referee: Martin Ulankiewicz

19 July 2017 7	MSV Duisburg	0–2	Norwich City	Hilbeck
19:00		Report	Oliveira 56'; Bomheuer 62' (o.g.)	Stadium: Willi-Hafer Stadion

23 July 2017 8	Aston Villa	3–0	MSV Duisburg	Duisburg
13:00	Green 21'; Hogan 23', 36'	Report		Stadium: MSV-Arena; Attendance: 5,913
Note: The match was played over 45 minutes

23 July 2017 9	Hertha BSC	0–1	MSV Duisburg	Duisburg
15:00		Report	Brandstetter 9'	Stadium: MSV-Arena; Attendance: 5,913
Note: The match was played over 45 minutes

30 August 2017 11	Borussia Mönchengladbach	2–1	MSV Duisburg	Mönchengladbach
17:00	Egbo 9'; Villalba 89'	Report	Hajri 47'	Stadium: Fohlenplatz; Attendance: 1,154; Referee: Guido Winkmann

2 September 2017 12	MSV Duisburg	8–1	VfB Speldorf	Duisburg
13:00	Onuegbu 45'; Engin 48', 77'; Brandstetter 55'; Souza 62', 63'; Iljutcenko 65' (pen.), 78'	Report	Timm 15'

2 September 2017 12	Bayer Leverkusen	3–3	MSV Duisburg	Leverkusen
13:00	Kießling 36'; Bellarabi 69'; Bailey 76'	Report	Stoppelkamp 11'; Iljutcenko 69'; Tashchy 84'	Attendance: 423; Referee: Sascha Stegemann

5 January 2018 13	MSV Duisburg	10–1	VfB Günnigfeld	Duisburg
18:45	Iljutcenko 17', 26', 33'; Corboz 31', 36'; Onuegbu 48', 63', 64'; Albutat 65', 82'	Report	Sahawi 62'

13 January 2018 14	MSV Duisburg	1–1	Ajax	Albufeira
15:15	Zeefuik 22' (o.g.)	Report	Sierhuis 77'	Stadium: Estádio Municipal de Albufeira

15 January 2018 15	MSV Duisburg	2–2	Beijing Guoan	Lagos
14:00	Onuegbu 79', 90'	Report	Zhang Xiz. 25'; Liu 81'	Stadium: Cascade Hotel

== Results ==
Times from 1 July to 29 October 2017 and from 25 March to 30 June 2018 are UTC+2, from 30 October 2017 to 25 March 2018 UTC+1.

=== Overview ===
Competition	First match	Last match	Starting round	Final position	Record							
Competition	First match	Last match	Starting round	Final position	Pld	W	D	L	GF	GA	GD	Win %
2. Bundesliga	30 July 2017	13 May 2018	Matchday 1	7th place	33	13	8	12	50	54	−4	39.39
DFB-Pokal	14 August 2017	14 August 2017	Round 1	Round 1	1	0	0	1	1	2	−1	0.00
Total					34	13	8	13	51	56	−5	38.24

Last updated: 13 May 2018
Source: Soccerway

=== 2. Bundesliga ===
==== League table ====
Pos	Team	Pld	W	D	L	GF	GA	GD	Pts
5	Jahn Regensburg	34	14	6	14	53	53	0	48
6	VfL Bochum	34	13	9	12	37	40	−3	48
7	MSV Duisburg	34	13	9	12	52	56	−4	48
8	Union Berlin	34	12	11	11	54	46	+8	47
9	FC Ingolstadt	34	12	9	13	47	45	+2	45

Source: DFB
Rules for classification: 1) Points; 2) Goal difference; 3) Goals scored

==== Results summary ====
Overall								Home						Away					
Pld	W	D	L	GF	GA	GD	Pts	W	D	L	GF	GA	GD	W	D	L	GF	GA	GD
34	13	9	12	52	56	−4	48	6	5	6	27	28	−1	7	4	6	25	28	−3

Last updated: 13 May 2018.
Source: bundesliga.de

==== Result round by round ====
Round	1	2	3	4	5	6	7	8	9	10	11	12	13	14	15	16	17	18	19	20	21	22	23	24	25	26	27	28	29	30	31	32	33	34
Ground	A	H	A	H	A	H	A	H	A	H	A	H	A	H	A	H	A	H	A	H	A	H	A	H	A	H	A	H	A	H	A	H	A	H
Result	L	D	W	L	W	L	D	L	L	D	W	D	W	W	L	W	D	W	W	D	W	D	L	W	L	L	L	L	D	L	W	W	D	W
Position	15	13	9	11	8	11	11	14	15	15	14	14	12	8	11	8	10	7	5	5	4	4	6	4	4	6	7	9	10	12	10	7	8	7

Updated to match(es) played on 13 May 2018. Source: bundesliga.de
A = Away; H = Home; W = Win; D = Draw; L = Loss

==== Matches ====
30 July 2017 1	Dynamo Dresden	1–0	MSV Duisburg	Dresden
15:30	Röser 88'	Report		Stadium: Stadion Dresden; Attendance: 28,250; Referee: Felix Zwayer

5 August 2017 2	MSV Duisburg	1–1	VfL Bochum	Duisburg
13:00	Tashchy 7'	Report	Bandowski 47'	Stadium: MSV-Arena; Attendance: 22,893; Referee: Martin Petersen

19 August 2017 3	1. FC Heidenheim	1–2	MSV Duisburg	Heidenheim
13:00	Glatzel 59'	Report	Stoppelkamp 61'; Tashchy 66'	Stadium: Voith-Arena; Attendance: 10,200; Referee: Harm Osmers

25 August 2017 4	MSV Duisburg	1–2	Darmstadt 98	Duisburg
18:30	Stoppelkamp 25'	Report	Mehlem 35'; Stark 88'	Stadium: MSV-Arena; Attendance: 16,297; Referee: Matthias Jöllenbeck

9 September 2017 5	Arminia Bielefeld	0–4	MSV Duisburg	Bielefeld
13:00		Report	Stoppelkamp 19'; Souza 55', 59'; Onuegbu 90'	Stadium: Bielefelder Alm; Attendance: 18,537; Referee: Robert Kempter

16 September 2017 6	MSV Duisburg	1–6	1. FC Nürnberg	Duisburg
13:00	Stoppelkamp 82' (pen.)	Report	Ishak 10', 25', 74'; Löwen 51', 75'; Teuchert 89'	Stadium: MSV-Arena; Attendance: 17,788; Referee: Timo Gerach

19 September 2017 7	FC Ingolstadt	2–2	MSV Duisburg	Ingolstadt
18:30	Wahl 42', 52'	Report	Tashchy 16', 54'	Stadium: Audi Sportpark; Attendance: 8,199; Referee: Frank Willenborg

22 September 2017 8	MSV Duisburg	1–3	Holstein Kiel	Duisburg
18:30	Fröde 90+2'	Report	Schindler 9'; Drexler 73', 88' (pen.)	Stadium: MSV-Arena; Attendance: 13,578; Referee: Benjamin Cortus

2 October 2017 9	Fortuna Düsseldorf	3–1	MSV Duisburg	Düsseldorf
20:30	Hennings 2'; Fink 6'; Raman 55'	Report	Stoppelkamp 57'	Stadium: Esprit Arena; Attendance: 41,764; Referee: Robert Schröder

13 October 2017 10	MSV Duisburg	0–0	Eintracht Braunschweig	Duisburg
18:30		Report		Stadium: MSV-Arena; Attendance: 13,855; Referee: Lasse Koslowski

22 October 2017 11	1. FC Kaiserslautern	0–1	MSV Duisburg	Kaiserslautern
13:30		Report	Bomheuer 67'	Stadium: Fritz-Walter-Stadion; Attendance: 22,833; Referee: Florian Heft

29 October 2017 12	MSV Duisburg	1–1	Union Berlin	Duisburg
13:30	Iljutcenko 86'	Report	Leistner 49'	Stadium: MSV-Arena; Attendance: 15,492; Referee: Christian Dietz

3 November 2017 13	SV Sandhausen	0–1	MSV Duisburg	Sandhausen
18:30		Report	Stoppelkamp 8'	Stadium: BWT-Stadion am Hardtwald; Attendance: 5,652; Referee: Florian Badstübner

19 November 2017 14	MSV Duisburg	3–0	Erzgebirge Aue	Duisburg
13:30	Souza 60', 54'; Tashchy 85'	Report		Stadium: MSV-Arena; Attendance: 13,309; Referee: Robert Kempter

25 November 2017 15	Jahn Regensburg	4–0	MSV Duisburg	Regensburg
13:00	Grüttner 8'; Nietfeld 26'; Lais 39'; Mees 87'	Report		Stadium: Continental Arena; Attendance: 9,889; Referee: Alexander Sather

2 December 2017 16	MSV Duisburg	2–0	SpVgg Greuther Fürth	Duisburg
13:00	Souza 40'; Tashchy 44'	Report		Stadium: MSV-Arena; Attendance: 12,017; Referee: Daniel Schlager

10 December 2017 17	FC St. Pauli	2–2	MSV Duisburg	Hamburg
13:30	Sobota 57'; Sobiech 62' (pen.)	Report	Wolze 32' (pen.); Iljutcenko 81'	Stadium: Millerntor-Stadion; Attendance: 29,546; Referee: Christian Dietz

17 December 2017 18	MSV Duisburg	2–0	Dynamo Dresden	Duisburg
13:30	Iljutcenko 45+1'; Wolze 83'	Report		Stadium: MSV-Arena; Attendance: 14,792; Referee: Robert Schröder

23 January 2018 19	VfL Bochum	0–2	MSV Duisburg	Bochum
18:30		Report	Iljutcenko 40'; Wolze 45+1' (pen.)	Stadium: Ruhrstadion; Attendance: 17,564; Referee: Benjamin Cortus

27 January 2018 20	MSV Duisburg	3–3	1. FC Heidenheim	Duisburg
13:00	Wolze 27' (pen.), 50'; Onuegbu 90'	Report	Thiel 14'; Schnatterer 33'; Bomheuer 42' (o.g.)	Stadium: MSV-Arena; Attendance: 13,105; Referee: Florian Heft

4 February 2018 21	Darmstadt 98	1–2	MSV Duisburg	Darmstadt
13:30	Ji 37'	Report	Engin 17'; Iljutcenko 85'	Stadium: Merck-Stadion am Böllenfalltor; Attendance: 15,100; Referee: Lasse Koslowski

10 February 2018 22	MSV Duisburg	2–2	Arminia Bielefeld	Duisburg
13:00	Tashchy 52'; Wolze 72'	Report	Schütz 39'; Weihrauch 67'	Stadium: MSV-Arena; Attendance: 16,213; Referee: Martin Petersen

18 February 2018 23	1. FC Nürnberg	3–1	MSV Duisburg	Nürnberg
13:30	Behrens 8' (pen.), 23'; Löwen 71'	Report	Stoppelkamp 41'	Stadium: Stadion Nürnberg; Attendance: 25,527; Referee: Arne Aarnink

24 February 2018 24	MSV Duisburg	2–1	FC Ingolstadt	Duisburg
13:00	Engin 13'; Tashchy 66' (pen.)	Report	Kutschke 18'	Stadium: MSV-Arena; Attendance: 12,446; Referee: Johann Pfeifer

3 March 2018 25	Holstein Kiel	5–0	MSV Duisburg	Kiel
13:00	Kinsombi 18'; Drexler 20'; Schindler 51' (pen.); Czichos 62'; Nauber 82' (o.g.)	Report		Stadium: Holstein-Stadion; Attendance: 10,143; Referee: Bastian Dankert

11 March 2018 26	MSV Duisburg	1–2	Fortuna Düsseldorf	Duisburg
13:30	Tashchy 90'	Report	Hennings 40'; Usami 88'	Stadium: MSV-Arena; Attendance: 28,000; Referee: Sascha Stegemann

18 March 2018 27	Eintracht Braunschweig	3–2	MSV Duisburg	Braunschweig
13:30	Nyman 18'; Tingager 20'; Abdullahi 40'	Report	Wolze 69'; Valsvik 83' (o.g.)	Stadium: Eintracht-Stadion; Attendance: 20,015; Referee: Lasse Koslowski

31 March 2018 28	MSV Duisburg	1–4	1. FC Kaiserslautern	Duisburg
13:00	Iljutcenko 70'	Report	Osawe 12', 48', 64'; Kessel 83'	Stadium: MSV-Arena; Attendance: 18,273; Referee: Robert Schröder

7 April 2018 29	Union Berlin	0–0	MSV Duisburg	Berlin
13:00		Report		Stadium: Stadion An der Alten Försterei; Attendance: 22,012; Referee: Florian Heft

14 April 2018 30	MSV Duisburg	0–2	SV Sandhausen	Duisburg
13:00		Report	Förster 39'; Kulovits 90+3'	Stadium: MSV-Arena; Attendance: 14,231; Referee: Florian Badstübner

22 April 2018 31	Erzgebirge Aue	1–3	MSV Duisburg	Aue
13:30	Nazarov 83'	Report	Wolze 56' (pen.), 90+1' (pen.); Tashchy 64'	Stadium: Sparkassen-Erzgebirgsstadion; Attendance: 11,950; Referee: Lasse Koslowski

29 April 2018 32	MSV Duisburg	4–1	Jahn Regensburg	Duisburg
13:30	Nauber 52'; Iljutcenko 60'; Stoppelkamp 75'; Engin 87'	Report	George 58'	Stadium: MSV-Arena; Attendance: 15,149; Referee: Tobias Reichel

6 May 2018 33	SpVgg Greuther Fürth	2–2	MSV Duisburg	Fürth
15:30	Caligiuri 44'; Ernst 75'	Report	Tashchy 62'; Souza 64'	Stadium: Sportpark Ronhof Thomas Sommer; Attendance: 12,380; Referee: Sascha Stegemann

13 May 2018 34	MSV Duisburg	2–0	FC St. Pauli	Duisburg
15:30	Stoppelkamp 45+2'; Gartner 90+5'	Report		Stadium: MSV-Arena; Attendance: 25,324; Referee: Deniz Aytekin

=== DFB-Pokal ===
14 August 2017 Round 1	MSV Duisburg	1–2	1. FC Nürnberg	Duisburg
18:30	Wolze 90+4' (pen.)	Report	Behrens 21'; Margreitter 41'	Stadium: MSV-Arena; Attendance: 15,576; Referee: Christian Dingert

== Statistics ==
=== Squad statistics ===
As of 13 May 2018.

No.	Pos	Nat	Player	Total		2. Bundesliga		DFB-Pokal	
No.	Pos	Nat	Player	Apps	Goals	Apps	Goals	Apps	Goals
1	GK	(Netherlands) NED	Mark Flekken	32	0	31	0	1	0
3	DF	(Tunisia) TUN	Enis Hajri	25	0	25	0	0	0
4	DF	(Germany) GER	Dustin Bomheuer	32	1	31	1	1	0
5	DF	(Bosnia and Herzegovina) BIH	Branimir Bajić	4	0	4	0	0	0
6	DF	(Germany) GER	Gerrit Nauber	35	1	34	1	1	0
7	MF	(Germany) GER	Andreas Wiegel	13	0	12	0	1	0
8	FW	(Germany) GER	Thomas Bröker	0	0	0	0	0	0
9	FW	(Germany) GER	Simon Brandstetter	7	0	6	0	1	0
10	FW	(Nigeria) NGR	Kingsley Onuegbu	31	2	30	2	1	0
11	FW	(Russia) RUS	Stanislav Iljutcenko	33	7	32	7	1	0
13	MF	(Bosnia and Herzegovina) BIH	Zlatko Janjić	0	0	0	0	0	0
14	MF	(Germany) GER	Tim Albutat	14	0	14	0	0	0
15	MF	(Germany) GER	Lukas Daschner	8	0	8	0	0	0
16	MF	(Germany) GER	Lukas Fröde	32	1	31	1	1	0
17	DF	(Germany) GER	Kevin Wolze	34	10	33	9	1	1
18	MF	(Germany) GER	Thomas Blomeyer	4	0	4	0	0	0
19	MF	(Germany) GER	Nico Klotz	9	0	9	0	0	0
20	MF	(Brazil) BRA	Cauly Oliveira Souza	28	6	27	6	1	0
22	GK	(Germany) GER	Daniel Zeaiter	1	0	1	0	0	0
23	FW	(Germany) GER	Fabian Schnellhardt	31	0	30	0	1	0
24	FW	(Ukraine) UKR	Borys Tashchy	33	11	32	11	1	0
25	MF	(Germany) GER	Barış Özbek	0	0	0	0	0	0
26	MF	(Germany) GER	Ahmet Engin	28	3	28	3	0	0
27	DF	(Germany) GER	Dan-Patrick Poggenberg	6	0	6	0	0	0
28	GK	(Iran) IRI	Daniel Davari	3	0	3	0	0	0
29	MF	(Azerbaijan) AZE	Tuğrul Erat	9	0	8	0	1	0
30	MF	(Germany) GER	Christian Gartner	7	1	7	1	0	0
31	DF	(Germany) GER	Marius Krüger	0	0	0	0	0	0
33	MF	(Germany) GER	Moritz Stoppelkamp	33	9	32	9	1	0

=== Goals ===
As of 13 May 2018.

Rank	Player	Position	2. Bundesliga	DFB-Pokal	Total
1	(Ukraine) Borys Tashchy	FW	11	0	11
2	(Germany) Kevin Wolze	DF	9	1	10
3	(Germany) Moritz Stoppelkamp	MF	9	0	9
4	(Russia) Stanislav Iljutcenko	FW	7	0	7
5	(Brazil) Cauly Oliveira Souza	MF	6	0	6
6	(Germany) Ahmet Engin	MF	3	0	3
7	(Nigeria) Kingsley Onuegbu	FW	2	0	2
8	(Germany) Dustin Bomheuer	DF	1	0	1
8	(Germany) Lukas Fröde	MF	1	0	1
8	(Germany) Christian Gartner	MF	1	0	1
8	(Germany) Gerrit Nauber	DF	1	0	1
Own goals			1	0	1
Total			52	1	53

=== Clean sheets ===
As of 13 May 2018.

Rank	Name	2. Bundesliga	DFB-Pokal	Total
1	(Netherlands) Mark Flekken	9	0	9
2	(Iran) Daniel Davari	1	0	1
Total		10	0	10

=== Disciplinary record ===
N	P	Nat.	Name	2. Bundesliga			DFB-Pokal			Total			Notes
N	P	Nat.	Name	Yellow card	Second yellow card	Red card	Yellow card	Second yellow card	Red card	Yellow card	Second yellow card	Red card	Notes
3	DF	(Tunisia)	Enis Hajri	12						12			
16	MF	(Germany)	Lukas Fröde	11	1					11	1		
11	FW	(Russia)	Stanislav Iljutcenko	7			1			8			
17	DF	(Germany)	Kevin Wolze	8						8			
23	MF	(Germany)	Fabian Schnellhardt	7						7			
4	DF	(Germany)	Dustin Bomheuer	4			1			5			
6	DF	(Germany)	Gerrit Nauber	4			1			5			
24	FW	(Ukraine)	Borys Tashchy	4						4			
26	FW	(Germany)	Ahmet Engin	3						3			
33	MF	(Germany)	Moritz Stoppelkamp	2			1			3			
1	GK	(Netherlands)	Mark Flekken	2						2			
7	MF	(Germany)	Andreas Wiegel	2						2			
14	MF	(Germany)	Tim Albutat	2						2			
15	MF	(Germany)	Lukas Daschner	1						1			
30	MF	(Germany)	Christian Gartner	1						1			

Last updated: 13 May 2018
Source: Matches
Ordered by (red card) , (second yellow card) and (yellow card)
(yellow card) = Number of bookings; (second yellow card) = Number of sending offs after a second yellow card; (red card) = Number of sending offs by a direct red card.
