= 2013–14 Fortuna Düsseldorf season =

Fortuna Düsseldorf
2013–14 season
- Sporting Director: Wolf Werner
- Manager: Mike Büskens (To 30 November); Oliver Reck (interim) (2 December–30 December); Lorenz-Günther Köstner (From 30 December)
- Stadium: Esprit Arena, Düsseldorf, NRW
- 2. Bundesliga: 6th
- DFB-Pokal: 1st round
Home colours	Away colours	Third colours

The 2013–14 Fortuna Düsseldorf season is the 119th season in the club's football history.

== Review and events ==
=== Summer window activity ===
Mike Büskens was announced as the new head coach of Fortuna Düsseldorf on 4 June. Michael Rensing and Ben Halloran officially transferred to Fortuna Düsseldorf on 1 July. André Fomitschow returned from his loan from Energie Cottbus. Robbie Kruse was sold. Nando Rafael and Robert Almer were released Andriy Voronin and Robert Tesche were returned after their loan spells.

The draw for the first round of the DFB-Pokal happened on 15 June. Fortuna Düsseldorf was drawn against SC Wiedenbrück.

=== July ===
Fortuna Düsseldorf's season kicked off on 22 July against Energie Cottbus on matchday one of the 2. Bundesliga. Prior to the match, Michael Rensing refused to be a substitute and left the stadium with his car. Fortuna Düsseldorf won with a goal from Stefan Reisinger. Stefan Reisinger's goal was scored from a penalty kick. Fortuna Düsseldorf finished the matchday tied for fourth place in the table with 1. FC Kaiserslautern, Karlsruher SC, and FC St. Pauli. Fortuna Düsseldorf finished July against 1. FC Köln on matchday two on 28 July. The match ended in a 1–1 draw. Charlison Benschop scored for Fortuna Düsseldorf and Anthony Ujah scored for 1. FC Köln Fortuna Düsseldorf finished July in fifth place.

==== Michael Rensing ====
Prior to the match against Energie Cottbus, Michael Rensing left the stadium with his car and went home after refusing to take the substitutes bench. Robin Heller replaced Michael Rensing in the matchday squad against Energie Cottbus. He apologized to the team for the incident. Michael Rensing was promised to be starting goalkeeper. He apologized to the team for the incident. He stated that he wants to fulfill his contractg with the club. Fabian Giefer was suspended for a match after receiving a red card against Erzgebirge Aue. Michael Rensing started the next match against Karlsruher SC.

=== August ===
Fortuna Düsseldorf started August with the first round of the DFB-Pokal against SC Wiedenbrück. Wiedenbrück won 1–0 with a goal from Marwin Studtrucker. Fortuna Düsseldorf then faced 1860 München on 9 August. 1860 München won 2–1. Charlison Benschop scored for Fortuna Düsseldorf. Benjamin Lauth and Marin Tomasov scored for 1860 München. Fortuna Düsseldorf finished the matchday tied for eighth place with VfL Bochum. Then Fortuna Düsseldorf faced Union Berlin on 19 August. Union Berlin won 2–1. Axel Bellinghausen scored for Fortuna Düsseldorf and Adam Nemec scored two goals for Union Berlin. Fortuna Düsseldorf finished the matchday in 13th place. Fortuna Düsseldorf went on to face VfL Bochum on 25 August. Fortuna Düsseldorf won 1–0 with a goal from Stefan Reisinger. Fortuna Düsseldorf finished the matchday in 11th place. Fortuna Düsseldorf finished August against Arminia Bielefeld on 30 August. Arminia Bielefeld won 4–2. Johannes Rahn and Giannis Gianniotas scored for Fortuna Düsseldorf. Thomas Hübener, Fabian Klos, and Sebastian Hille scored for Arminia Bielefeld. Sebastian Hille scored two goals. Fortuna Düsseldorf finished August in 14th place.

=== September ===
Fortuna Düsseldorf started September with a 5–0 win against VfL Benrath in a friendly match. Fortuna Düsseldorf returned to Bundesliga action against Dynamo Dresden on 15 September. The match ended in a 1–1 draw. Oliver Fink scored for Fortuna Düsseldorf and Tobias Müller scored for Dynamo Dresden. Fortuna Düsseldorf finished the matchday in 15th place. Then Fortuna Düsseldorf faced FC St. Pauli on 23 September. This match also ended in a 1–1 draw. Florian Kringe scored for Fortuna Düsseldorf and Aristide Bancé scored for St. Pauli. Fortuna Düsseldorf finished the matchday in 13th place. Fortuna Düsseldorf finished September against FSV Frankfurt on 28 September. The match ended in a 0–0 draw. Fortuna Düsseldorf finished September in 15th place.

=== October ===
Fortuna Düsseldorf started October with matchday 10 against Greuther Fürth on 7 October. Fortuna Düsseldorf won 2–1. Charlison Benschop scored two goals for Fortuna Düsseldorf and Florian Trinks scored for Greuther Fürth. Fortuna Düsseldorf finished the matchday in ninth place. Fortuna Düsseldorf faced FC Ingolstadt 04 on 20 October. Fortuna Düsseldorf won 2–1. Charlison Benschop scored two goals for Fortuna Düsseldorf and Marvin Matip scored for Ingolstadt. Fortuna Düsseldorf finished the matchday in sixth place. Fortuna Düsseldorf finished October with matchday 12 against SC Paderborn 07 on 26 October. Paderborn won 6–1. Martin Latka scored for Fortuna Düsseldorf and scored an own goal for Paderborn. Mahir Sağlık and Elias Kachunga scored for Paderborn. Mahir Sağlık scored four goals. Fortuna Düsseldorf finished October in 10th place.

=== November ===
Fortuna Düsseldorf started November with matchday 13 against VfR Aalen on 1 November. Aalen won 1–0 with a goal from Robert Lechleiter. Fortuna Düsseldorf finished the matchday in 11th place. Fortuna Düsseldorf then faced SV Sandhausen on 10 November. Fortuna Düsseldorf won 1–0 with a goal from Aristide Bancé. Fortuna Düsseldorf finished the matchday in ninth place. Fortuna Düsseldorf's next opponents were Erzgebirge Aue on 24 November. Erzgebirge Aue won 3–0 with goals from Michael Fink, Zlatko Janjić, and Guido Kocer. Fortuna Düsseldorf finished the matchday in 14th place. Fortuna Düsseldorf finished November against Karlsruher SC on 29 November. Karlsruhe won 2–0 with goals from Selçuk Alibaz and Dominic Peitz. Fortuna Düsseldorf finished November in 15th place. Mike Büskens was sacked the following day. Oliver Reck was named interim head coach.

=== December ===
Oliver Reck was named interim head coach on 2 December and had his first match in charge on 9 December. Fortuna Düsseldorf started December with matchday 17 against 1. FC Kaiserslautern on 9 December. Fortuna Düsseldorf won 1–0 with a goal from Erwin Hoffer. Fortuna Düsseldorf finished the matchday in 12th place. Fortuna Düsseldorf faced Energie Cottbus Erwin Hoffer, Charlison Benschop, and Tuğrul Erat scored for Fortuna Düsseldorf and Amin Affane scored for Energie Cottbus. Fortuna Düsseldorf finished the matchday in ninth place. Fortuna Düsseldorf finished December against 1. FC Köln on 22 December. Köln won 3–2. Erwin Hoffer and Charlison Benschop scored for Fortuna Düsseldorf. Anthony Ujah and Patrick Helmes scored for Köln. Anthony Ujah scored two goals. Fortuna Düsseldorf finished December in 10th place. Lorenz-Günther Köstner became the new head coach for Fortuna Düsseldorf on 30 December.

== Fixtures and results ==
=== Legend ===
Win Draw Loss Postponed

=== 2. Bundesliga ===
==== League results and fixtures ====
MD	Date	Kickoff^{1}	Stadium	Opponent	Result^{2}	Attendance	Goalscorers		League position	Ref.
MD	Date	Kickoff^{1}	Stadium	Opponent	Result^{2}	Attendance	Fortuna Düsseldorf	Opponent	League position	Ref.
1	22 Jul.	20:15	H	Energie Cottbus	1–0	33,924	Reisinger 65' pen.	—	4th	
2	28 Jul.	15:30	A	1. FC Köln	1–1	50,000	Benschop 12'	Ujah 67'	5th	
3	9 Aug.	18:30	H	1860 München	1–2	34,626	Benschop 37' pen.	Lauth 9', Tomasov 78'	8th	
4	19 Aug.	20:15	A	Union Berlin	1–2	20,846	Bellinghausen 77'	Nemec 43', 55'	13th	
5	25 Aug.	13:30	H	VfL Bochum	1–0	37,233	Reisinger 8'	—	11th	
6	30 Aug.	18:30	A	Arminia Bielefeld	2–4	21,065	Rahn 21' o.g., Gianniotas 33'	Hübener 28 pen., Klos 47', Hille 86', 90+1'	14th	
7	15 Sep.	13:30	H	Dynamo Dresden	1–1	35,947	Fink 18'	Müller 82'	15th	
8	23 Sep.	20:15	A	FC St. Pauli	1–1	29,063	Kringe 82'	Bancé 47'	13th	
9	28 Sep.	13:00	H	FSV Frankfurt	0–0	30,254	—	—	15th	
10	7 Oct.	20:15	H	Greuther Fürth	2–1	30,412	Benschop 52', 55'	Trinks 15'	9th	
11	20 Oct.	13:30	A	Ingolstadt 04	2–1	6,380	Benschop 50', 63'	Matip 90+1'	6th	
12	26 Oct.	13:00	H	Paderborn 07	1–6	31,827	Latka 40'	Sağlık 28', 45+1', 63', 70', Kachunga 76', Latka 86' o.g.	10th	
13	1 Nov.	18:30	A	VfR Aalen	0–1	9,278	—	Lechleiter 23'	11th	
14	10 Nov.	13:30	H	SV Sandhausen	1–0	28,489	Bancé 60'	—	9th	
15	24 Nov.	13:30	A	Erzgebirge Aue	0–3	8,300	—	Fink 18', Janjić 37' pen., Kocer 52'	14th	
16	29 Nov.	18:30	H	Karlsruher SC	0–2	27,453	—	Alibaz 28', Peitz 71'	15th	
17	9 Dec.	20:15	A	1. FC Kaiserslautern	1–0	29,579	Hoffer 31'	—	12th	
18	14 Dec.	13:00	A	Energie Cottbus	3–1	7,056	Hoffer 11', Benschop 63', Erat 83'	Affane 7'	9th	
19	22 Dec.	14:30	H	1. FC Köln	2–3	52,500	Hoffer 55', Benschop 62'	Ujah 29', 75', Helmes 38'	10th	
20			A	1860 München						
21			H	Union Berlin						
22			A	VfL Bochum						
23			H	Arminia Bielefeld						
24			A	Dynamo Dresden						
25			H	FC St. Pauli						
26			A	FSV Frankfurt						
27			A	Greuther Fürth						
28			H	Ingolstadt 04						
29			A	Paderborn 07						
30			H	VfR Aalen						
31			A	SV Sandhausen						
32			H	Erzgebirge Aue						
33	4 May	13:30	A	Karlsruher SC						
34	11 May	13:30	H	1. FC Kaiserslautern						

==== League table ====
Pos	Team	Pld	W	D	L	GF	GA	GD	Pts
4	1. FC Kaiserslautern	34	15	9	10	55	39	+16	54
5	Karlsruher SC	34	12	14	8	47	34	+13	50
6	Fortuna Düsseldorf	34	13	11	10	45	44	+1	50
7	1860 Munich	34	13	9	12	38	41	−3	48
8	FC St. Pauli	34	13	9	12	44	49	−5	48

Source: kicker.de
Rules for classification: 1) points; 2) goal difference; 3) number of goals scored.

=== DFB-Pokal ===
Round	Date	Kickoff^{1}	Stadium	City	Opponent	Result^{2}	Attendance	Goalscorers		Source
Round	Date	Kickoff^{1}	Stadium	City	Opponent	Result^{2}	Attendance	Fortuna Düsseldorf	Opponent	Source
R1	4 August	16:00	Heidewaldstadion	Rheda-Wiedenbrück	SC Wiedenbrück	0–1	6,850	—	Studtrucker 90+1' pen.	

== Appearances and goals ==
As of 31 December 2013

No.	Pos	Nat	Player	Total		Bundesliga		DFB-Pokal	
No.	Pos	Nat	Player	Apps	Goals	Apps	Goals	Apps	Goals
Goalkeepers
1	GK	(Germany) GER	Michael Rensing	2	0	2	0	0	0
33	GK	(Germany) GER	Fabian Giefer	19	0	18	0	1	0
38	GK	(Germany) GER	Robin Heller	0	0	0	0	0	0
Defenders
2	DF	(Ecuador) ECU	Cristian Ramírez	15	0	14	0	1	0
3	DF	(Germany) GER	Leon Balogun	9	0	8	0	1	0
4	DF	(Greece) GRE	Stelios Malezas	10	0	10	0	0	0
6	DF	(Germany) GER	Dustin Bomheuer	13	0	12	0	1	0
8	DF	(Kazakhstan) KAZ	Heinrich Schmidtgal	3	0	3	0	0	0
14	DF	(Brazil) BRA	Bruno Soares	9	0	9	0	0	0
19	DF	(Germany) GER	Tobias Levels	17	0	16	0	1	0
28	DF	(Czech Republic) CZE	Martin Latka	12	1	12	1	0	0
				0	0	0	0	0	0
				0	0	0	0	0	0
Midfielders
				0	0	0	0	0	0
				0	0	0	0	0	0
				0	0	0	0	0	0
				0	0	0	0	0	0
				0	0	0	0	0	0
				0	0	0	0	0	0
				0	0	0	0	0	0
				0	0	0	0	0	0
				0	0	0	0	0	0
				0	0	0	0	0	0
				0	0	0	0	0	0
				0	0	0	0	0	0
				0	0	0	0	0	0
				0	0	0	0	0	0
Forwards
				0	0	0	0	0	0
				0	0	0	0	0	0
				0	0	0	0	0	0
				0	0	0	0	0	0
				0	0	0	0	0	0
				0	0	0	0	0	0

== Transfers ==
=== In ===
Pos.	Name	Age	Moving from	Type	Transfer Window	Contract ends	Transfer fee	Sources
GK	Michael Rensing	29	Bayer Leverkusen	End of contract	Summer	2015	Free	
MF	Ben Halloran	21	Brisbane Roar	Transfer	Summer	2016		

=== Out ===
Pos.	Name	Age	Moving to	Type	Transfer Window	Transfer fee	Sources
FW	Robbie Kruse	24	Bayer Leverkusen	Transfer	Summer	€1.5 Million	
GK	Robert Almer	29		Released	Summer	Free	
FW	Nando Rafael	29		Released	Summer	Free	
FW	Andriy Voronin	33	Dynamo Moscow	Loan return	Summer	—	
MF	Robert Tesche	26	Hamburger SV	Loan return	Summer	—	

== Notes ==
- 1.Kickoff is in the Central European Time.
- 2.Kickoff time is sourced at here.
- 3.Fortuna Düsseldorf's goals listed first.
