= 2016 Schauinsland-Reisen-Cup =

Tournament details
- Host country: Germany
- Dates: 17 July
- Teams: 4 (from 1 confederation)
- Venue: 1 (in 1 host city)

Final positions
- Champions: (Germany) Hertha BSC (1st title)
- Runners-up: (Germany) MSV Duisburg
- Third place: (Germany) Eintracht Frankfurt
- Fourth place: (France) Nantes

Tournament statistics
- Matches played: 4
- Goals scored: 10 (2.5 per match)
- Top scorer(s): (Germany) Julian Schieber (Bosnia and Herzegovina) Zlatko Janjić (2 goals)

The 2016 Schauinsland-Reisen-Cup was a summer football friendly tournament organized by MSV Duisburg and Match IQ. It was hosted by MSV Duisburg at the Schauinsland-Reisen-Arena in Duisburg, on 17 July 2016. Alongside the hosts, Eintracht Frankfurt (Germany), Hertha BSC (Germany), and Nantes (France) also took part. It was sponsored by Schauinsland-Reisen.

== Overview ==
=== Participants ===
Nation	Team	Location	Confederation	League
Germany	Eintracht Frankfurt	Frankfurt	UEFA	Bundesliga
Germany	Hertha BSC	Berlin	UEFA	Bundesliga
Germany	MSV Duisburg	Duisburg	UEFA	3. Liga
France	Nantes	Nantes	UEFA	Ligue 1

=== Bracket ===
Semi-finals
17 July 2016
(Germany) MSV Duisburg	0 (5)
(Germany) Eintracht Frankfurt	0 (4)
17 July 2016
(France) Nantes	1 (5)
(Germany) Hertha BSC	1 (6)

Final
17 July 2016
(Germany) MSV Duisburg	2 (2)
(Germany) Hertha BSC	2 (3)
Third place play-off
17 July 2016
(Germany) Eintracht Frankfurt	3
(France) Nantes	1

=== Matches ===
All matches lasted for just 45 minutes. If a match was level after normal time then a penalty shoot-out was played to decide who advanced.

Semi-finals

17 July 2016
13:00 CEST

MSV Duisburg (Germany)	0–0	(Germany) Eintracht Frankfurt
	Report
Penalties
Albutat (penalty missed); Onuegbu (penalty scored); Wolze (penalty scored); Brandstetter (penalty scored); Bajić (penalty scored); Schnellhardt (penalty scored)	5–4	(penalty scored) Meier; (penalty scored) Huszti; (penalty scored) Hasebe; (penalty missed) Rebić; (penalty scored) Blum; (penalty missed) Flum

Schauinsland-Reisen-Arena, Duisburg
Attendance: 5,026

17 July 2016
14:00 CEST

Nantes (France)	1–1	(Germany) Hertha BSC
Sala 8'	Report	Langkamp 19'
Penalties
Lucas Lima (penalty scored); Rongier (penalty scored); Thomasson (penalty scored); Sala (penalty scored); Gillet (penalty scored); Thomsen (penalty missed); Diego Carlos (penalty missed)	5–6	(penalty scored) Lustenberger; (penalty scored) Ibišević; (penalty scored) Ciğerci; (penalty missed) Weiser; (penalty scored) Kalou; (penalty scored) Baumjohann; (penalty scored) Skjelbred

Schauinsland-Reisen-Arena, Duisburg
Attendance: 5,026

Third place play-off

17 July 2016
16:10 CEST

Eintracht Frankfurt (Germany)	3–1	(France) Nantes
Castaignos 6'; Mascarell 15'; Aigner 38'	Report	Alégué 44'

Schauinsland-Reisen-Arena, Duisburg
Attendance: 5,026

Final

17 July 2016
17:10 CEST

MSV Duisburg (Germany)	2–2	(Germany) Hertha BSC
Janjić 17', 32'	Report	Schieber 38', 44'
Penalties
Janjić (penalty scored); Dausch (penalty missed); Wolze (penalty scored); Wiegel (penalty missed); Özbek (penalty missed)	2–3	(penalty scored) Darida; (penalty scored) Hegeler; (penalty scored) Kohls; (penalty missed) Stark

Schauinsland-Reisen-Arena, Duisburg
Attendance: 5,026

=== Goalscorers ===
Rank	Name	Team	Goals
1	(Germany) Julian Schieber	(Germany) Hertha BSC	2
1	(Bosnia and Herzegovina) Zlatko Janjić	(Germany) MSV Duisburg	2
2	(Cameroon) Alexis Alégué	(France) Nantes	1
2	(Argentina) Emiliano Sala	(France) Nantes	1
2	(Netherlands) Luc Castaignos	(Germany) Eintracht Frankfurt	1
2	(Spain) Omar Mascarell	(Germany) Eintracht Frankfurt	1
2	(Germany) Sebastian Langkamp	(Germany) Hertha BSC	1
2	(Germany) Stefan Aigner	(Germany) Eintracht Frankfurt	1

== Media coverage ==
Market	Countries	Broadcast partner	Ref
Germany	1	Sport1 (German)	
International	195	Bet365 (N/A); LAOLA1.TV (N/A)	
Total countries	195		
