= Dan-Patrick Poggenberg =

German footballer

Personal information
- Date of birth: 28 March 1992 (age 34)
- Place of birth: Bad Oldesloe, Germany
- Height: 1.84 m (6 ft 0 in)
- Position: Left-back

Youth career
- Preußen Reinfeld
- –2008: SV Eichede
- 2008–2010: Holstein Kiel

Senior career*
Years	Team	Apps	(Gls)
2010–2012	Holstein Kiel	49	(2)
2010–2012	Holstein Kiel II	3	(0)
2012–2015	VfL Wolfsburg II	64	(0)
2014–2015	→ Chemnitzer FC (loan)	35	(0)
2015–2018	MSV Duisburg	20	(0)
2018–2020	Sonnenhof Großaspach	31	(0)
2020–2022	Fortuna Köln	55	(1)
2022–2023	Bonner SC	20	(0)
- * Club domestic league appearances and goals as of 04:27, 14 March 2024 (UTC)

Dan-Patrick Poggenberg (born 28 March 1992) is a German footballer who plays as a left-back.

== Career ==
He joined Chemnitzer FC on loan for the 2014–15 season where he made 37 appearances. He joined MSV Duisburg for the 2015–16 season. On 9 May 2018, it was announced that he will leave Duisburg at the end of the 2017–18 season. He signed for SG Sonnenhof Großaspach at the 2018–19 season. He signed for Fortuna Köln in July 2020.

== Career statistics ==
As of match played 7 May 2023

Appearances and goals by club, season and competition
Club	Season	League			National Cup		Other		Total	
Club	Season	Division	Apps	Goals	Apps	Goals	Apps	Goals	Apps	Goals
Holstein Kiel	2010–11	Regionalliga Nord	25	0	—		—		25	0
Holstein Kiel	2011–12	Regionalliga Nord	24	2	4	0	—		28	2
Holstein Kiel	Total		49	2	4	0	0	0	53	2
VfL Wolfsburg II	2012–13	Regionalliga Nord	31	0	—		—		31	0
VfL Wolfsburg II	2013–14	Regionalliga Nord	33	0	—		2 (Note: Appearances in the Regionalliga playoff)	0	35	0
VfL Wolfsburg II	Total		64	0	—		2	0	66	0
Chemnitzer FC (loan)	2014–15	3. Liga	35	0	2	0	—		37	0
MSV Duisburg	2015–16	2. Bundesliga	10	0	0	0	2 (Note: Appearances in the Relegation playoff)	0	12	0
MSV Duisburg	2016–17	3. Liga	4	0	0	0	—		4	0
MSV Duisburg	2017–18	2. Bundesliga	6	0	0	0	—		6	0
MSV Duisburg	Total		20	0	0	0	2	0	22	0
MSV Duisburg II	2015–16	Oberliga Niederrhein	2	0	—		—		2	0
Sonnenhof Großaspach	2018–19	3. Liga	14	0	—		—		14	0
Sonnenhof Großaspach	2019–20	3. Liga	17	0	—		—		17	0
Sonnenhof Großaspach	Total		31	0	—		—		31	0
Fortuna Köln	2020–21	Regionalliga West	30	0	—		—		30	0
Fortuna Köln	2020–21	Regionalliga West	25	1	—		—		25	1
Fortuna Köln	Total		55	1	—		—		55	1
Bonner SC	2022–23	Oberliga Mittelrhein	20	0	—		—		20	0
Career Total			276	3	6	0	4	0	286	3
