= Stanislav Iljutcenko =

Russian footballer (born 1990)

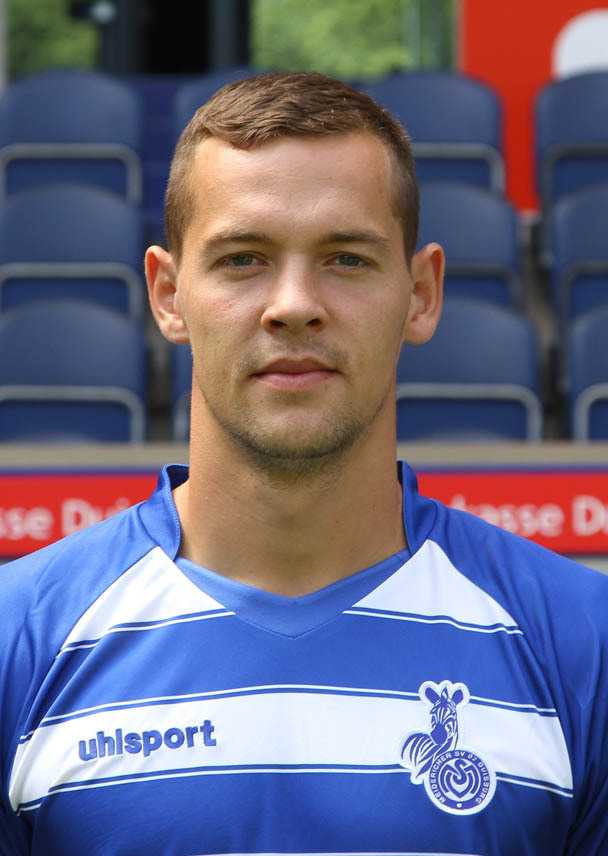
- Iljutcenko with MSV Duisburg in 2015

Personal information
- Birth name: Stanislav Ilyutchenko
- Date of birth: 13 August 1990 (age 36)
- Place of birth: Yashalta, Russian SFSR, Soviet Union
- Height: 1.89 m (6 ft 2 in)
- Position: Striker

Team information
- Current team: Hwaseong FC
- Number: 90

Youth career
- –2011: DJK Westfalia Soest

Senior career*
| Years | Team | Apps | (Gls) |
| 2011–2013 | Westfalia Rhynern | 52 | (37) |
| 2013–2015 | VfL Osnabrück | 57 | (13) |
| 2015–2019 | MSV Duisburg | 116 | (22) |
| 2019–2020 | Pohang Steelers | 44 | (28) |
| 2021–2022 | Jeonbuk Hyundai Motors | 51 | (17) |
| 2022–2024 | FC Seoul | 76 | (26) |
| 2025–2026 | Suwon Samsung Bluewings | 35 | (14) |
| 2026– | Hwaseong FC | 2 | (0) |
- * Club domestic league appearances and goals as of 12 August 2026

Stanislav Iljutcenko (Russian: Станислав Ильюченко, Stanislav Ilyutchenko; born 13 August 1990) is a Russian professional footballer who plays as a striker for Hwaseong FC.

== Club career ==
Iljutcenko was born in Yashalta in the republic of Kalmykia, part of the Russian SFSR in the Soviet Union. He moved to Germany at the age of five.

Ahead of the 2015–16 season, he signed for MSV Duisburg.

On 9 May 2018, he re-signed for Duisburg for two more years, which tied him at the club until 2020.

On 18 June 2019, he signed for the Pohang Steelers.

On 18 January 2021, he signed for Jeonbuk Hyundai Motors.

On 12 July 2022, he signed for FC Seoul. On 14 February 2023, he was nominated as the captain.

On 7 January 2025, Iljutcenko was announce official transfer to Suwon Samsung Bluewings for 2025 season.

== Career statistics ==
=== Club ===
As of the start for 2026 season.

Appearances and goals by club, season and competition
| Club | Season | League | | | National cup (Note: Includes DFB-Pokal, Korean FA Cup) | | Continental | | Total | |
| Club | Season | Division | Apps | Goals | Apps | Goals | Apps | Goals | Apps | Goals |
|---|---|---|---|---|---|---|---|---|---|---|
| Westfalia Rhynern | 2011–12 | NRW-Liga | 21 | 8 | — | | — | | 21 | 8 |
| Westfalia Rhynern | 2012–13 | Oberliga Westfalen | 31 | 29 | — | | — | | 31 | 29 |
| Westfalia Rhynern | Total | | 52 | 37 | — | | — | | 52 | 37 |
| VFL Osnabrück | 2013–14 | 3. Liga | 22 | 0 | 2 | 0 | — | | 24 | 0 |
| VFL Osnabrück | 2014–15 | 3. Liga | 35 | 13 | 4 | 1 | — | | 39 | 14 |
| VFL Osnabrück | Total | | 57 | 13 | 6 | 1 | — | | 63 | 14 |
| MSV Duisburg | 2015–16 | 2. Bundesliga | 21 | 3 | 1 | 0 | — | | 22 | 3 |
| MSV Duisburg | 2016–17 | 3. Liga | 33 | 8 | 1 | 1 | — | | 34 | 9 |
| MSV Duisburg | 2017–18 | 2. Bundesliga | 31 | 7 | 1 | 0 | — | | 32 | 7 |
| MSV Duisburg | 2018–19 | 2. Bundesliga | 31 | 4 | 3 | 0 | — | | 34 | 4 |
| MSV Duisburg | Total | | 116 | 22 | 6 | 1 | — | | 122 | 23 |
| Pohang Steelers | 2019 | K League 1 | 18 | 9 | 0 | 0 | — | | 18 | 9 |
| Pohang Steelers | 2020 | K League 1 | 26 | 19 | 4 | 3 | — | | 30 | 22 |
| Pohang Steelers | Total | | 44 | 28 | 4 | 3 | — | | 48 | 31 |
| Jeonbuk Hyundai Motors | 2021 | K League 1 | 34 | 15 | 1 | 0 | 8 (Note: Appearances in AFC Champions League) | 4 | 43 | 19 |
| Jeonbuk Hyundai Motors | 2022 | K League 1 | 17 | 2 | 2 | 0 | 4 | 2 | 23 | 4 |
| Jeonbuk Hyundai Motors | Total | | 51 | 17 | 3 | 0 | 12 | 6 | 66 | 23 |
| FC Seoul | 2022 | K League 1 | 16 | 7 | 3 | 0 | — | | 19 | 7 |
| FC Seoul | 2023 | K League 1 | 24 | 5 | 1 | 0 | — | | 25 | 5 |
| FC Seoul | 2024 | K League 1 | 36 | 14 | 2 | 0 | — | | 38 | 14 |
| FC Seoul | Total | | 76 | 26 | 6 | 0 | — | | 82 | 26 |
| Suwon Samsung Bluewings | 2025 | K League 2 | 35 | 14 | 1 | 1 | — | | 36 | 15 |
| Suwon Samsung Bluewings | 2026 | K League 2 | 0 | 0 | 0 | 0 | — | | 0 | 0 |
| Suwon Samsung Bluewings | Total | | 35 | 14 | 1 | 1 | — | | 36 | 15 |
| Career total | | | 431 | 157 | 26 | 6 | 12 | 6 | 469 | 169 |

== Honours ==
Jeonbuk Hyundai Motors

- K League 1: 2021

Individual

- K League 1 Best XI: 2020
