= Mark Flekken =

Dutch footballer (born 1993)

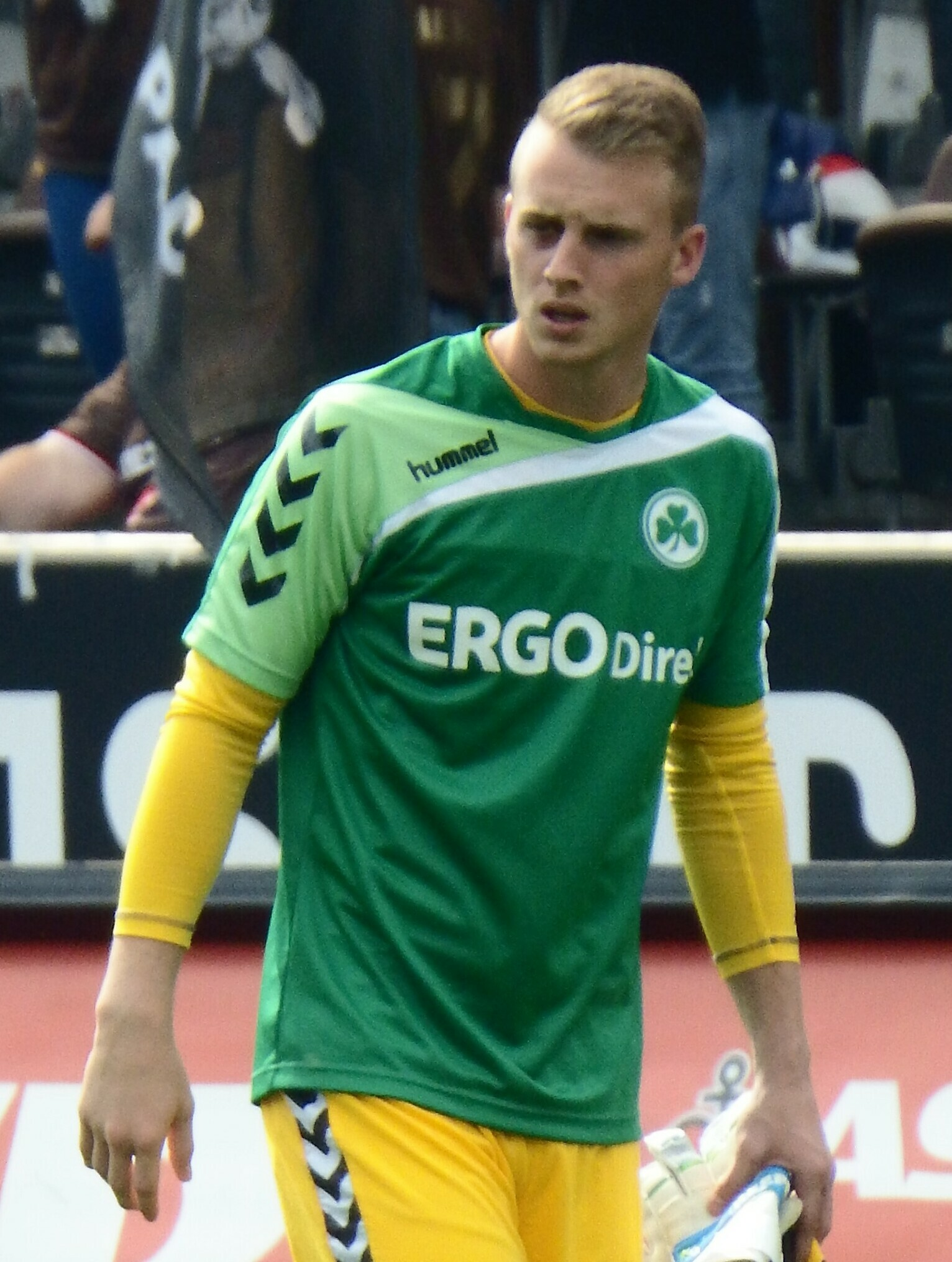
- Flekken with Greuther Fürth in 2015

Personal information
- Full name: Mark Maria Hubertus Flekken
- Date of birth: 13 June 1993 (age 33)
- Place of birth: Kerkrade, Netherlands
- Height: 1.94 m (6 ft 4 in)
- Position: Goalkeeper

Team information
- Current team: Bayer Leverkusen
- Number: 1

Youth career
- WDZ
- –2009: Roda JC
- 2009–2012: Alemannia Aachen

Senior career*
Years	Team	Apps	(Gls)
2012–2013	Alemannia Aachen	15	(0)
2013–2016	Greuther Fürth	25	(0)
2013–2016	Greuther Fürth II	3	(0)
2016–2018	MSV Duisburg	68	(1)
2018–2023	SC Freiburg	80	(0)
2021	SC Freiburg II	3	(0)
2023–2025	Brentford	74	(0)
2025–	Bayer Leverkusen	32	(0)

International career^{‡}
2022–	Netherlands	12	(0)
Medal record
Men's football
Representing Netherlands
UEFA European Championship
Bronze medal – third place	2024 Germany	Team
- * Club domestic league appearances and goals as of 31 October 2026 ‡ National team caps and goals as of 8 June 2026

Mark Maria Hubertus Flekken (born 13 June 1993) is a Dutch professional footballer who plays as a goalkeeper for Bundesliga club Bayer Leverkusen and the Netherlands national team.

== Early years ==
Flekken grew up in Bocholtz, Limburg, Netherlands on the German border. His parents René and Annie used to play football themselves, and his younger brother Roy also became a goalkeeper.

== Club career ==
=== Alemannia Aachen and Greuther Fürth ===
Flekken started his career in the youth department of RKVV WDZ from Bocholtz before moving to the youth academy of Roda JC Kerkrade. In 2009, he moved across the border to the youth teams of the then 2. Bundesliga club Alemannia Aachen. On 22 September 2011, he signed his first professional contract.

During the winter break of the 2012–13 3. Liga season, Flekken was appointed as the starting goalkeeper by coach René van Eck after the financially troubled club had parted ways with Michael Melka. Flekken made his debut on 26 January 2013 in a 2–0 home game against 1. FC Saarbrücken.

Ahead of the 2013–14 season, Flekken moved to the 2. Bundesliga club SpVgg Greuther Fürth. There, he only made three league appearances in three years as a backup goalkeeper behind Wolfgang Hesl and Sebastian Mielitz.

=== MSV Duisburg ===
Flekken signed for MSV Duisburg on 12 June 2016. On 7 August 2016, he scored a goal, after a corner, in a 1–1 draw against VfL Osnabrück, when he went to the opposite box during the last minute. In February 2018, Flekken conceded a goal in a 2. Bundesliga match against FC Ingolstadt, when he turned his back on the play to take a drink from his water bottle.

=== SC Freiburg ===
Flekken joined SC Freiburg for the 2018–19 season. A backup to Alexander Schwolow throughout the season, he made his debut in the final matchday of the 2018–19 season against 1. FC Nürnberg. After Schwolow's departure before the start of the 2020–21 season, he was appointed the new starter, but shortly after he suffered a complicated elbow injury while warming up for the DFB-Pokal match against SV Waldhof Mannheim which sidelined him for the entire season. Meanwhile, he was replaced in goal by Florian Müller, who was on loan from Mainz 05. He returned as the starter in goal on 9 May 2021; before that he had regained match practice with the Freiburg reserves in the Regionalliga Südwest.

Flekken started the 2021–22 season as the undisputed first-choice goalkeeper and, after ten games in a row without defeat, saw the team in third place of the league, to which he had contributed with the league's best rate of shots saved.

=== Brentford ===
On 31 May 2023, Flekken signed for Premier League club Brentford for a reported fee of £11 million.

==== 2023–24 season ====
In his debut season, Flekken recorded seven clean sheets and made 113 saves, ranking eighth in both categories across the Premier League. He also stood out for his distribution, becoming one of only two goalkeepers in the league to register an assist, setting up a goal for Neal Maupay against Manchester City. He made four key passes, the most by any goalkeeper in the division that season.

In February 2024, Flekken won the Premier League Save of the Month award for a reflex save against Pedro Neto of Wolverhampton Wanderers. The stop was later nominated for Premier League Save of the Season. His form across the campaign earned him a call-up to the Netherlands national team for UEFA Euro 2024.

==== 2024–25 season ====
In the 2024–25 season, he maintained a high level of performance and was named Brentford's Player of the Month for February 2025 after conceding just one goal across three matches, including clean sheets in victories over West Ham United and Leicester City. By April 2025, he had made more saves than any other goalkeeper in Europe's top five leagues, with 103, and ranked eighth in the Premier League for save percentage at 72.5%. In addition, Flekken was rated as the fifth best goalkeeper in the world according to data from the CIES Football Observatory Index.

Upon the conclusion of the 2024–25 season, he led the Premier League in saves, making 153 with a save percentage of 73.6%.

=== Bayer Leverkusen ===
On 3 June 2025, Flekken signed for Bundesliga club Bayer Leverkusen on a three-year deal for a reported fee of around €10 million.

== International career ==
Flekken was called up to the senior Netherlands national team squad for the 2022 FIFA World Cup qualification matches against Montenegro and Norway on 13 and 16 November 2021, respectively.

Flekken made his international debut for the Netherlands on 26 March 2022 in a friendly match against Denmark.

On 29 May 2024, Flekken was named in the Netherlands' squad for UEFA Euro 2024.

On 27 May 2026, Flekken was named in the Netherlands' squad for the 2026 FIFA World Cup.

== Career statistics ==
=== Club ===
As of match played 31 October 2026

Appearances and goals by club, season and competition
Club	Season	League			National cup (Note: Includes DFB-Pokal)		League cup (Note: Includes EFL Cup)		Europe		Other		Total	
Club	Season	Division	Apps	Goals	Apps	Goals	Apps	Goals	Apps	Goals	Apps	Goals	Apps	Goals
Alemannia Aachen	2012–13	3. Liga	15	0	—		—		—		—		15	0
Greuther Fürth II	2013–14	Regionalliga Bayern	14	0	—		—		—		—		14	0
Greuther Fürth II	2014–15	Regionalliga Bayern	3	0	—		—		—		—		3	0
Greuther Fürth II	2015–16	Regionalliga Bayern	8	0	—		—		—		—		8	0
Greuther Fürth II	Total		25	0	—		—		—		—		25	0
Greuther Fürth	2013–14	2. Bundesliga	0	0	0	0	—		—		0	0	2	0
Greuther Fürth	2014–15	2. Bundesliga	2	0	0	0	—		—		—		2	0
Greuther Fürth	2015–16	2. Bundesliga	1	0	1	0	—		—		—		2	0
Greuther Fürth	Total		3	0	1	0	—		—		0	0	4	0
MSV Duisburg	2016–17	3. Liga	37	1	1	0	—		—		—		38	1
MSV Duisburg	2017–18	2. Bundesliga	31	0	1	0	—		—		—		32	0
MSV Duisburg	Total		68	1	2	0	—		—		—		70	1
SC Freiburg	2018–19	Bundesliga	1	0	0	0	—		—		—		1	0
SC Freiburg	2019–20	Bundesliga	10	0	1	0	—		—		—		11	0
SC Freiburg	2020–21	Bundesliga	3	0	1	0	—		—		—		4	0
SC Freiburg	2021–22	Bundesliga	32	0	5	0	—		—		—		37	0
SC Freiburg	2022–23	Bundesliga	34	0	3	0	—		7 (Note: Appearances in UEFA Europa League)	0	—		44	0
SC Freiburg	Total		80	0	10	0	—		7	0	—		97	0
SC Freiburg II	2020–21	Regionalliga Südwest	3	0	—		—		—		—		3	0
Brentford	2023–24	Premier League	37	0	0	0	1	0	—		—		38	0
Brentford	2024–25	Premier League	37	0	0	0	2	0	—		—		39	0
Brentford	Total		74	0	0	0	3	0	—		—		77	0
Bayer Leverkusen	2025–26	Bundesliga	24	0	3	0	—		6 (Note: Appearances in UEFA Champions League)	0	—		33	0
Bayer Leverkusen	2026–27	Bundesliga	8	0	0	0	—		2	0	—		10	0
Bayer Leverkusen	Total		32	0	3	0	—		8	0	—		43	0
Career total			300	1	16	0	4	0	15	0	0	0	335	1

=== International ===
As of match played 8 June 2026

Appearances and goals by national team and year
National team	Year	Apps	Goals
Netherlands	2022	4	0
Netherlands	2023	2	0
Netherlands	2024	2	0
Netherlands	2025	2	0
Netherlands	2026	2	0
Total		12	0

== Honours ==
MSV Duisburg

- 3. Liga: 2016–17
- Lower Rhine Cup: 2016–17

SC Freiburg II

- Regionalliga Südwest: 2020–21

SC Freiburg

- DFB-Pokal runner-up: 2021–22

Individual

- Premier League Save of the Month: February 2024
