= Mael Corboz =

American soccer player (born 1994)

Personal information
- Date of birth: September 6, 1994 (age 32)
- Place of birth: Mobile, Alabama, United States
- Height: 1.80 m (5 ft 11 in)
- Position: Midfielder

Team information
- Current team: Grenoble
- Number: 14

Youth career
- New York Red Bulls

College career
Years	Team	Apps	(Gls)
2012–2013	Rutgers Scarlet Knights	35	(10)
2014–2015	Maryland Terrapins	45	(12)

Senior career*
Years	Team	Apps	(Gls)
2016	New York Red Bulls	0	(0)
2016	Wilmington Hammerheads	14	(1)
2016–2018	MSV Duisburg	0	(0)
2018–2019	Wattenscheid 09	48	(5)
2019–2021	Go Ahead Eagles	39	(5)
2021–2024	SC Verl	112	(14)
2024–2026	Arminia Bielefeld	86	(12)
2026–	Grenoble	0	(0)
- * Club domestic league appearances and goals as of May 18, 2026

Mael Corboz (born September 6, 1994) is an American professional soccer player who plays as a midfielder for French Ligue 2 club Grenoble.

== Early life ==
Born to French-born parents, Corboz has dual citizenship with France. Corboz's father is a former semi-professional player in Grenoble, and his sisters, Daphne and Rachel play professional football in the Première Ligue, the first division of women's football in France.

Raised in Green Brook Township, New Jersey, Corboz played prep soccer at the Pingry School in Basking Ridge, New Jersey and was a member of the New York Red Bulls Academy. After starting his collegiate career at Rutgers University, where he captained the team his sophomore season, Corboz transferred to the University of Maryland at the start of his junior year.

== Professional career ==
=== New York Red Bulls ===
On December 23, 2015, Corboz signed a Homegrown Contract with the New York Red Bulls. He joins former Red Bulls academy players Brandon Allen, Alex Muyl, Chris Thorsheim, Scott Thomsen and New York Red Bulls II players, Derrick Etienne and Tyler Adams as the seventh homegrown player signing this season. However, Corboz was waived prior to the season.

=== Wilmington Hammerheads ===
Corboz signed with United Soccer League side and New York City FC affiliate club, Wilmington Hammerheads FC on March 18. Two weeks later, Corboz made his professional debut with the club in their season opener against Orlando City B where he assisted on the opening goal of the match.

=== MSV Duisburg ===
He moved to MSV Duisburg on August 31, 2016. He made his debut for the club in a Lower Rhine Cup match against PSV Solingen on September 2, 2016. However, he made zero league appearances across one and a half seasons.

=== Wattenscheid 09 ===
On January 31, 2018, he signed with Wattenscheid 09.

=== Go Ahead Eagles ===
Since July 2019, Corboz is under contract with Go Ahead Eagles in the Eerste Divisie, the Dutch second-tier.

=== SC Verl ===
Corboz moved to 3. Liga club SC Verl in January 2021, having agreed a contract until summer 2023. He made his debut on January 12, 2021, in a 4–3 win against SpVgg Unterhaching. He scored his first goal for SC Verl on March 10, 2021, in a 2–1 win against Bayern Munich II.

=== Arminia Bielefeld ===
On January 10, 2024, Corboz signed for Arminia Bielefeld. After the retirement of Fabian Klos, Corboz was named Arminia captain for the 2024–25 season.

=== Grenoble ===
On June 26, 2026, Corboz moved to Grenoble in French Ligue 2.

== Career statistics ==
As of July 26, 2021

Appearances and goals by club, season and competition
Club	Season	League		Regional Cup		Domestic Cup		Continental		Total	
Club	Season	Apps	Goals	Apps	Goals	Apps	Goals	Apps	Goals	Apps	Goals
New York Red Bulls	2016	0	0	—		0	0	—		0	0
Wilmington Hammerheads FC	2016	14	1	—		3	1	—		17	2
MSV Duisburg	2016–17	0	0	5	0	0	0	—		5	0
MSV Duisburg	2017–18	0	0	0	0	0	0	—		5	0
MSV Duisburg	Total	0	0	5	0	0	0	—		0	0
SG Wattenscheid 09	2017–18	14	0	0	0	0	0	—		14	0
SG Wattenscheid 09	2018–19	33	5	1	0	0	0	—		34	5
SG Wattenscheid 09	Total	47	5	1	0	0	0	—		48	5
Go Ahead Eagles	2019–20	25	5	—		4	0	—		29	5
Go Ahead Eagles	2020–21	14	0	—		0	0	—		14	0
Go Ahead Eagles	Total	39	5	—		4	0	—		43	5
SC Verl	2020–21	20	2	2	0	0	0	—		22	2
SC Verl	2021–22	1	0	0	0	0	0	—		1	0
SC Verl	Total	21	2	2	0	0	0	—		23	2
Career total		121	11	8	0	7	1	0	0	136	14

== Honors ==
Arminia Bielefeld

- 3. Liga: 2024–25
- DFB-Pokal
  - Runners-up: 2024–25
- Westphalian Cup: 2024–25
- Individual
- 2024–25 3. Liga Player of the Season
