= Charlison Benschop =

Professional footballer (born 1989)

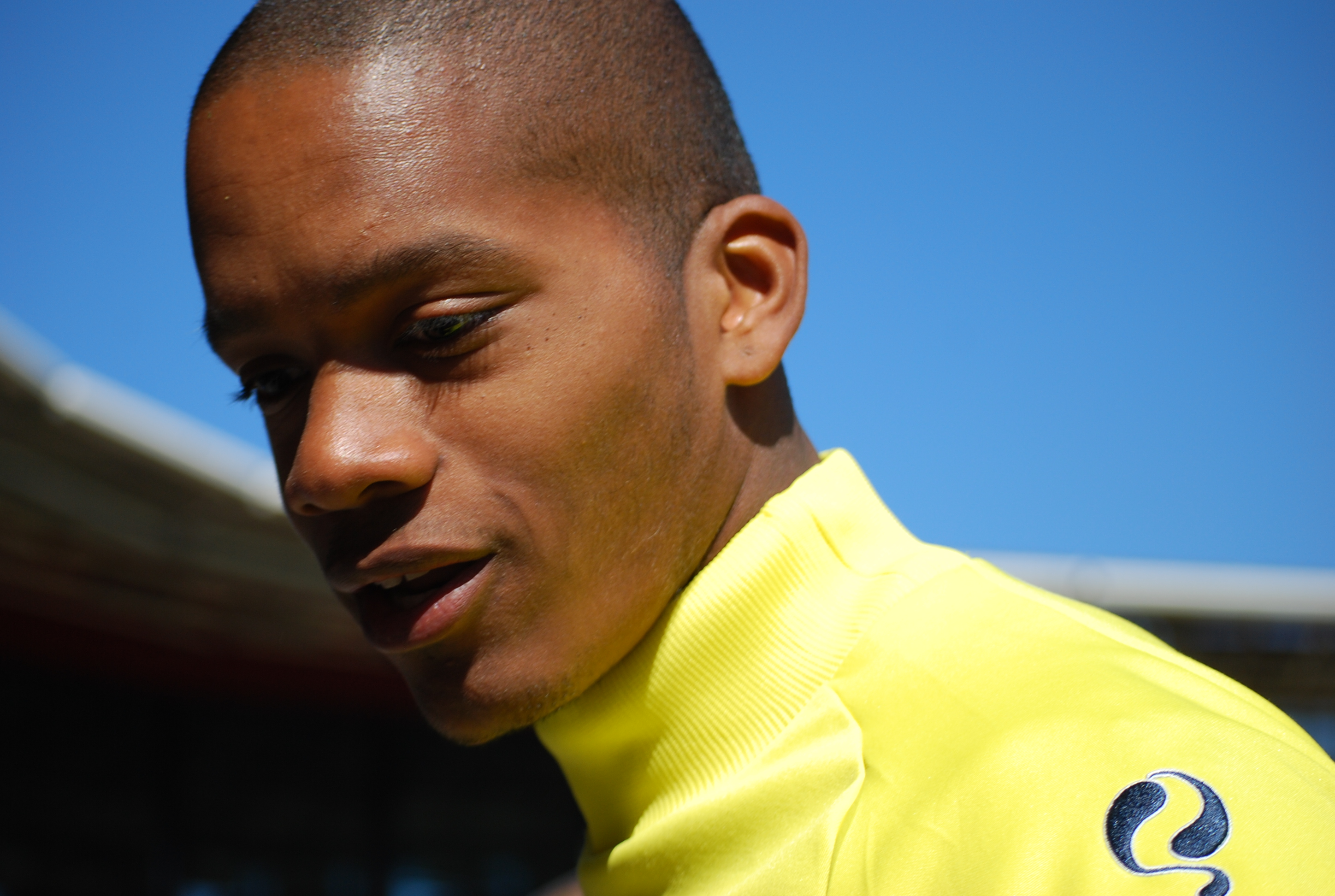
- Benschop in 2011

Personal information
- Full name: Charlison Girigorio Benschop
- Date of birth: 21 August 1989 (age 37)
- Place of birth: Willemstad, Netherlands Antilles
- Height: 1.91 m (6 ft 3 in)
- Position: Forward

Team information
- Current team: Fortuna Düsseldorf II
- Number: 35

Youth career
- SCO '63
- VV Spijkenisse

Senior career*
Years	Team	Apps	(Gls)
2007–2010	RKC	69	(18)
2010–2012	AZ	45	(6)
2012–2013	Brest	18	(3)
2013–2015	Fortuna Düsseldorf	58	(25)
2015–2018	Hannover 96	16	(2)
2017–2018	Hannover 96 II	5	(1)
2018–2019	FC Ingolstadt	9	(1)
2019	→ De Graafschap (loan)	14	(3)
2019–2020	Groningen	18	(3)
2020–2021	Apollon Limassol	35	(10)
2021–2022	SV Sandhausen	13	(0)
2022	Fortuna Sittard	13	(1)
2022–2023	De Graafschap	31	(6)
2023–2024	Wuppertaler SV	32	(13)
2024–2025	Alemannia Aachen	22	(2)
2025–	Fortuna Düsseldorf II	9	(2)

International career^{‡}
2010	Netherlands U21	1	(1)
2017–2021	Curaçao	10	(3)
- * Club domestic league appearances and goals as of 24 June 2026 ‡ National team caps and goals as of 16:13, 19 June 2021 (UTC)

Charlison Girigorio Benschop (born 21 August 1989) is a Curaçaoan professional footballer who plays as a forward for German Regionalliga club Fortuna Düsseldorf II and the Curaçao senior national team.

== Club career ==
Benschop played youth football with SCO '63 and VV Spijkenisse, and began his senior professional career with RKC Waalwijk during the 2007–08 season. He signed a five-year contract with AZ in March 2010.

In summer 2012, Benschop moved abroad to play in France for Brest, only to move on to German side Fortuna Düsseldorf a year later.

On 4 June 2015, Benschop joined Hannover 96 from Fortuna Düsseldorf on a three-year contract.

On 11 May 2018, Benschop joined FC Ingolstadt 04 on a two-year deal.

He joined FC Groningen in July 2019.

In January 2020, Benschop signed with Apollon Limassol until 2021.

On 31 January 2022, he signed for Eredivisie club Fortuna Sittard on a contract until mid-2023.

On 1 August 2022, Benschop returned to De Graafschap on a one-year contract with an option to extend.

On 8 July 2023, Benschop signed with Wuppertaler SV in the German fourth-tier Regionalliga West.

On 6 May 2024, Benschop agreed to move to Alemannia Aachen in 3. Liga.

In July 2025 he signed for Fortuna Düsseldorf II.

== International career ==
Benschop played international football at youth level for the Netherlands. Benschop was called up to the preliminary Curaçao national team for the 2017 CONCACAF Gold Cup. Benschop made his debut for Curaçao in a 2–1 friendly win over Qatar on 10 October 2017.

== Personal life ==
He is the uncle of Kevin Felida.

== Career statistics ==
=== International ===
Appearances and goals by national team and year
National team	Year	Apps	Goals
Curaçao	2017	1	0
Curaçao	2018	2	0
Curaçao	2019	3	0
Curaçao	2020	–	
Curaçao	2021	4	3
Total		10	3

Scores and results list Curaçao's goal tally first, score column indicates score after each Benschop goal.

List of international goals scored by Charlison Benschop
No.	Date	Venue	Opponent	Score	Result	Competition
1	28 March 2021	Doroteo Guamuch Flores Stadium, Guatemala City, Guatemala	Cuba	2–1	2–1	2022 FIFA World Cup qualification
3	5 June 2021	Manuel Felipe Carrera Stadium, Guatemala City, Guatemala	British Virgin Islands	4–0	8–0	2022 FIFA World Cup qualification
4	5 June 2021	Manuel Felipe Carrera Stadium, Guatemala City, Guatemala	British Virgin Islands	5–0	8–0	2022 FIFA World Cup qualification
