= Simon Brandstetter =

German footballer

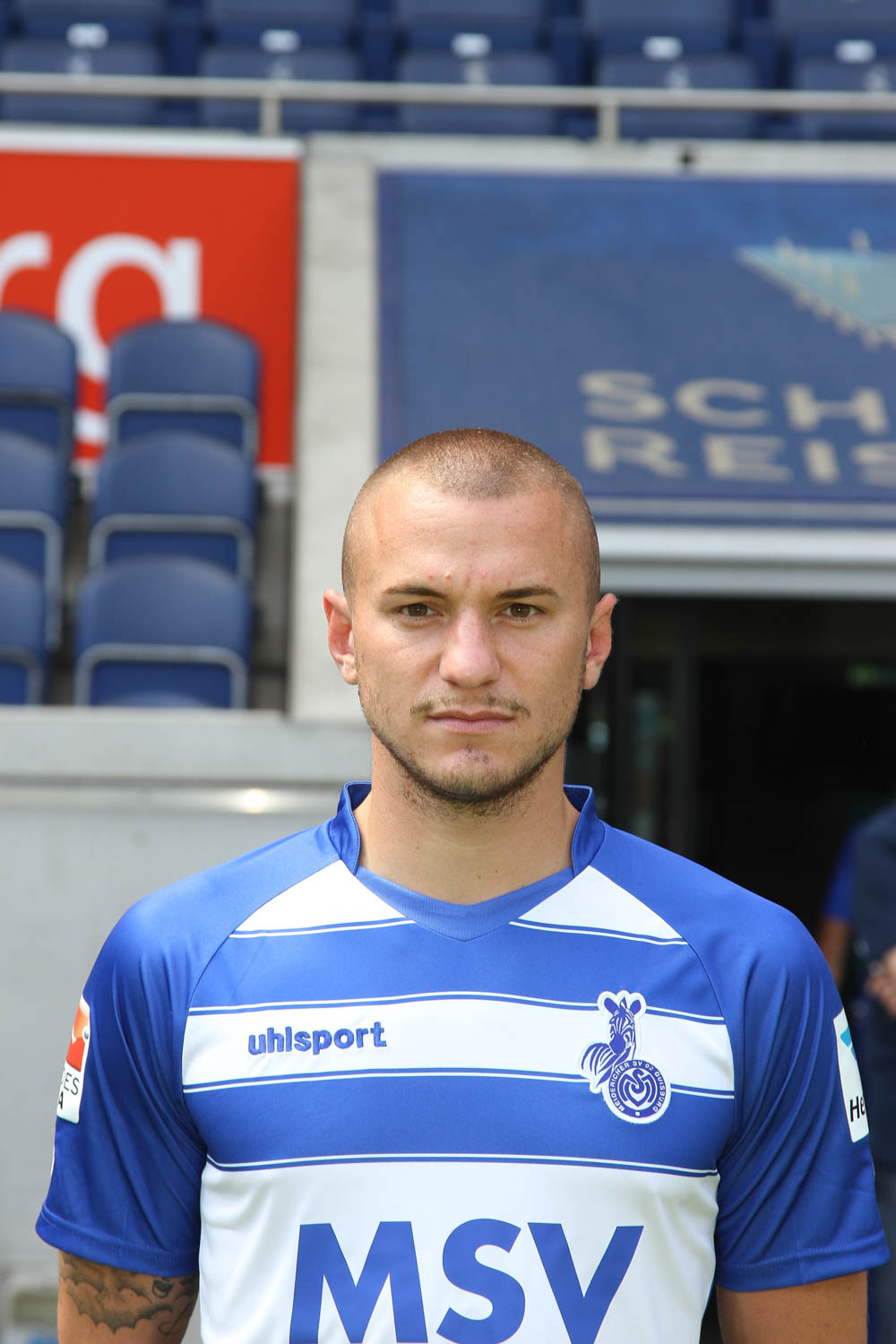
- Brandstetter in 2015

Personal information
- Date of birth: 2 May 1990 (age 36)
- Place of birth: Esslingen, West Germany
- Height: 1.87 m (6 ft 2 in)
- Position: Forward

Team information
- Current team: Mainz 05 II
- Number: 9

Youth career
- –2003: TSV Oberensingen
- 2003–2004: FV 09 Nürtingen
- 2004–2005: VfB Stuttgart
- 2005–2006: VfL Kirchheim/Teck
- 2006–2009: Stuttgarter Kickers

Senior career*
Years	Team	Apps	(Gls)
2009–2012	SC Freiburg II	72	(29)
2011–2013	SC Freiburg	0	(0)
2012–2013	→ Karlsruher SC (loan)	6	(0)
2013–2015	Rot-Weiß Erfurt	43	(10)
2015–2018	MSV Duisburg	42	(4)
2018–2019	Wehen Wiesbaden	35	(8)
2019–	Mainz 05 II	50	(29)

International career
2010–2011	Germany U20	2	(0)
- * Club domestic league appearances and goals as of 1 July 2021

Simon Brandstetter (born 2 May 1990) is a German professional footballer who plays as a forward for Mainz 05 II.

== Career ==
Brandstetter began his career with SC Freiburg, who he joined from Stuttgarter Kickers' youth team in 2009, and was promoted to the first team two years later. He made no first-team appearances during the 2011–12 season, and was loaned to Karlsruher SC in July 2012, making his debut five months later as a substitute for Koen van der Biezen in a 5–2 win over 1. FC Heidenheim. He made six appearances during the 2012–13 season, as Karlsruhe won the 3. Liga title, before joining Rot-Weiß Erfurt at the end of the season.

On 2 June 2015, he signed a two-year contract with MSV Duisburg for the 2015–16 season.

He moved to Wehen Wiesbaden on 1 January 2018, signing a contract until 2019. On 25 May 2019, Mainz 05 announced that Brandstetter would join their reserve team, Mainz 05 II, from the 2019–20 season.

== International career ==
Brandstetter represented the Germany U20 team twice.

== Career statistics ==
As of match played 17 December 2017

Appearances and goals by club, season and competition
Club	Season	League			DFB-Pokal		Other		Total	
Club	Season	Division	Apps	Goals	Apps	Goals	Apps	Goals	Apps	Goals
SC Freiburg II	2009–10	Regionalliga Südwest	27	5	—		—		27	5
SC Freiburg II	2010–11	Regionalliga Südwest	29	18	—		—		29	18
SC Freiburg II	2011–12	Regionalliga Südwest	14	6	—		—		14	6
SC Freiburg II	Total		70	29	—		—		70	29
Karlsruher SC (loan)	2012–13	3. Liga	6	0	0	0	—		6	0
Rot-Weiß Erfurt	2013–14	3. Liga	20	5	0	0	—		20	5
Rot-Weiß Erfurt	2014–15	3. Liga	23	5	0	0	—		23	5
Rot-Weiß Erfurt	Total		43	10	0	0	0	0	43	10
MSV Duisburg	2015–16	2. Bundesliga	5	0	1	0	—		6	0
MSV Duisburg	2016–17	3. Liga	31	4	1	0	—		32	4
MSV Duisburg	2017–18	2. Bundesliga	6	0	1	0	—		7	0
MSV Duisburg	Total		42	4	3	0	0	0	45	4
Wehen Wiesbaden	2017–18	3. Liga	0	0	—		—		0	0
Career total			161	43	3	0	0	0	164	43
