= Christian Gartner (footballer) =

Austrian footballer

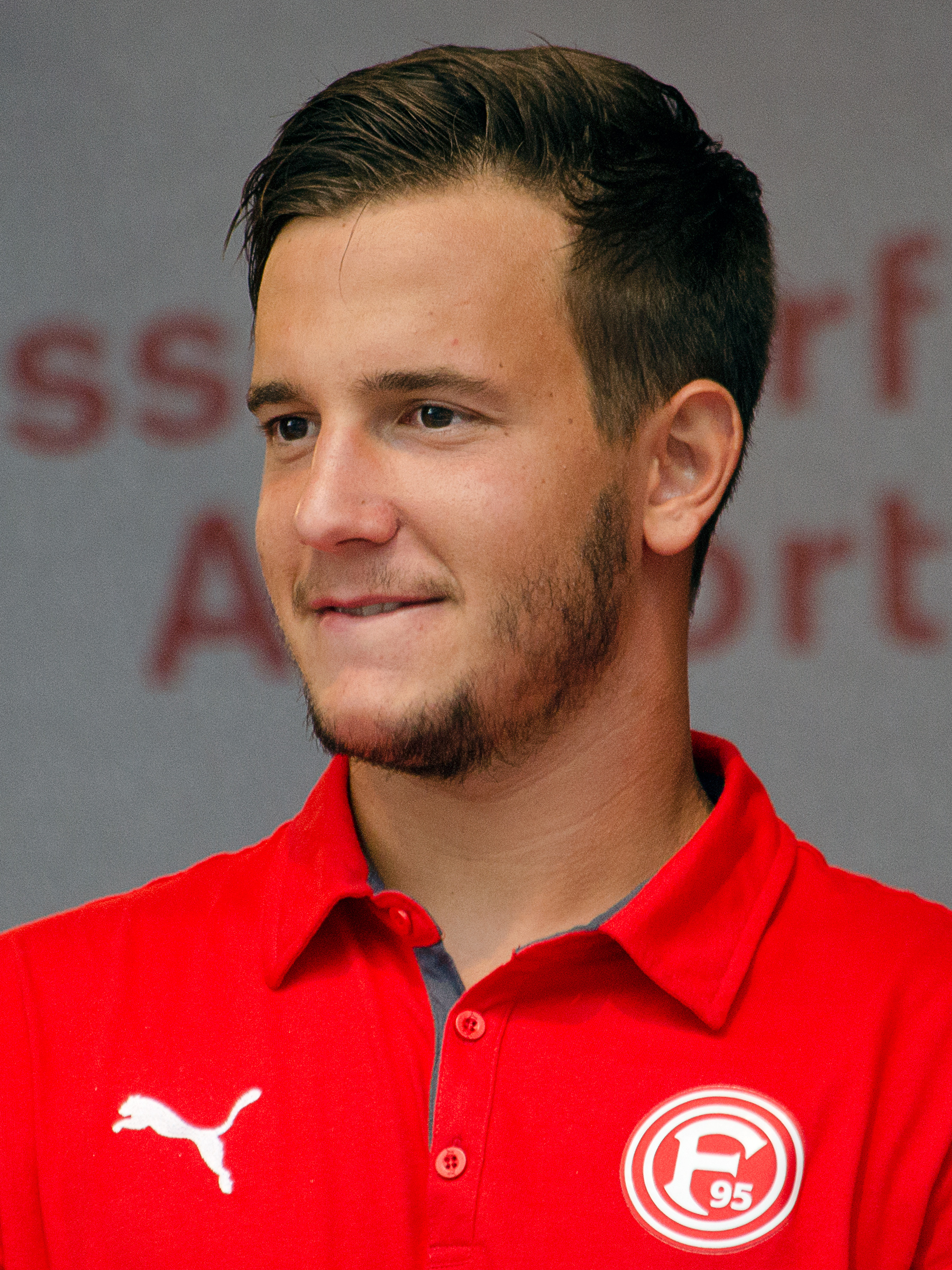
- Gartner with Fortuna Düsseldorf in 2013

Personal information
- Date of birth: 3 April 1994 (age 32)
- Place of birth: Kittsee, Austria
- Height: 1.80 m (5 ft 11 in)
- Position: Midfielder

Team information
- Current team: SV Stripfing
- Number: 10

Senior career*
Years	Team	Apps	(Gls)
2010–2013	SV Mattersburg II	37	(2)
2009–2013	SV Mattersburg	28	(3)
2013–2017	Fortuna Düsseldorf	49	(2)
2013–2016	→ Fortuna Düsseldorf II	16	(1)
2018–2019	MSV Duisburg	9	(1)
2020	Admira Wacker II	3	(1)
2021	Admira Wacker	7	(0)
2021–2022	Alemannia Aachen	19	(0)
2022–	SV Stripfing	47	(3)

International career^{‡}
2009–2010	Austria U16	7	(1)
2010	Austria U17	9	(1)
2011	Austria U18	1	(0)
2011–2013	Austria U19	13	(1)
- * Club domestic league appearances and goals as of 26 May 2024 ‡ National team caps and goals as of 23 June 2013

Christian Gartner (born 3 April 1994) is an Austrian footballer who plays for SV Stripfing.

== Career ==
In June 2013, Gartner moved to Fortuna Düsseldorf, who had been relegated from the Bundesliga to 2. Bundesliga in the previous season, from SV Mattersburg. In summer 2017, he was released by the club having made 49 league appearances with 2 goals and 1 assist.

On 3 January 2018, free agent Gartner joined MSV Duisburg, signing a contract until 2019 with an option. He left Duisburg after the 2018–19 season.
