= Daniel Zeaiter =

Footballer (born 1995)

Personal information
- Date of birth: 30 March 1995 (age 31)
- Place of birth: Bad Homburg, Germany
- Height: 1.89 m (6 ft 2 in)
- Position: Goalkeeper

Team information
- Current team: Rot-Weiss Frankfurt
- Number: 33

Youth career
- SG Ober-Erlenbach
- SG Rosenhöhe
- Darmstadt 98
- –2014: Mainz 05

Senior career*
| Years | Team | Apps | (Gls) |
| 2014–2016 | Mainz 05 II | 5 | (0) |
| 2016–2018 | MSV Duisburg | 1 | (0) |
| 2018–2019 | Alemannia Aachen | 11 | (0) |
| 2020–2025 | FC Eddersheim | 141 | (0) |
| 2025– | Rot-Weiss Frankfurt | 13 | (0) |
- * Club domestic league appearances and goals as of 20:51, 6 November 2025 (UTC)

Daniel Zeaiter (Arabic: دانيل زعيتر; born 30 March 1995) is a professional footballer who plays as a goalkeeper for German club Rot-Weiss Frankfurt. Born in Germany, Zeaiter was called up to the Lebanon national team in 2015.

== Club career ==
After signing with MSV Duisburg in 2016, it was announced on 9 May 2018 that Zeaiter would leave Duisburg at the end of the 2017–18 season. He joined Alemannia Aachen for the 2018–19 season, signing a contract until 2020. On 12 July 2020, Zeaiter joined FC Eddersheim in the Hessenliga, the fifth tier of German football. He joined Rot-Weiss Frankfurt ahead of the 2025–26 season.

== International career ==
Zeaiter was born in Germany and is of Lebanese descent. He was first called up to the Lebanon national team in 2015.
