= Thomas Blomeyer =

German footballer (born 1996)

Personal information
- Date of birth: 24 April 1996 (age 30)
- Place of birth: Freising, Germany
- Height: 1.91 m (6 ft 3 in)
- Position: Defender

Youth career
- FC Ingolstadt

Senior career*
Years	Team	Apps	(Gls)
2013–2016	FC Ingolstadt II	41	(1)
2016–2019	MSV Duisburg	13	(0)
2019	→ Sportfreunde Lotte (loan)	3	(0)
2019–2020	Austria Klagenfurt	6	(0)
- * Club domestic league appearances and goals as of 14:20, 7 April 2022 (UTC)

Thomas Blomeyer (born 24 April 1996) is a German professional footballer who most recently played as a defender for Austria Klagenfurt.

== Career ==
Blomeyer signed for MSV Duisburg for the 2016–17 season and made his 3. Liga debut on 13 August 2016 against Mainz 05 II. On 9 May 2018, he re-signed with Duisburg for two more years, which tied him at the club until 2020.

On 29 January 2019, he was loaned out to Sportfreunde Lotte until the end of the 2019–20 season.

On 2 September 2019, Blomeyer joined Austria Klagenfurt on a season-long contract with an option for another year.
