= Enis Hajri =

Tunisian footballer (born 1983)

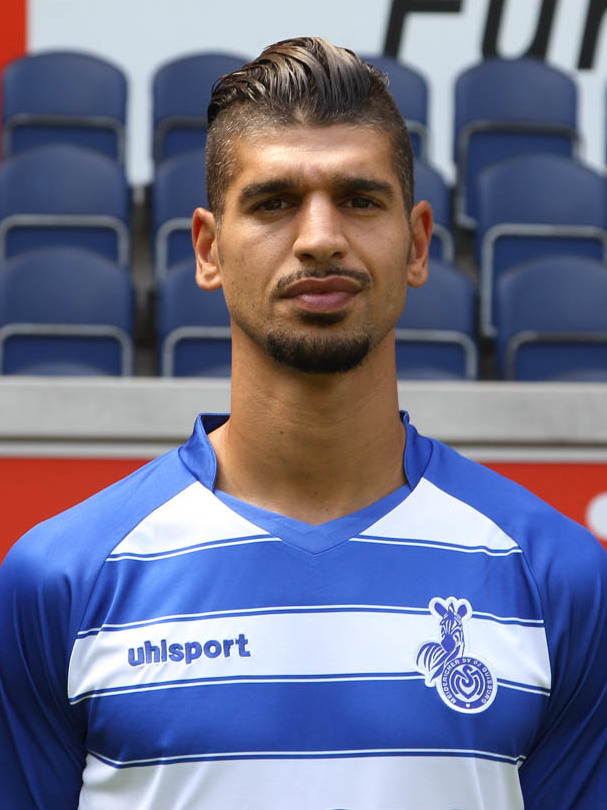
- Hajri in 2015

Personal information
- Full name: Enis Ben Mohamed Hajri
- Date of birth: 6 March 1983 (age 43)
- Place of birth: M'saken, Tunisia
- Height: 1.87 m (6 ft 2 in)
- Positions: Defender; midfielder

Youth career
- KSG Gerlingen

Senior career*
Years	Team	Apps	(Gls)
2004–2006	SpVgg Ludwigsburg	35	(2)
2006–2007	Waldhof Mannheim	13	(0)
2007	Alemannia Aachen II	10	(0)
2008	SpVgg Weiden	14	(0)
2008–2009	FSV Oggersheim	30	(1)
2009–2012	Chernomorets Burgas	48	(6)
2012	Henan Jianye	11	(0)
2012–2014	1. FC Kaiserslautern	6	(1)
2013	→ CS Sfaxien (loan)	0	(0)
2013–2014	→ FC Homburg (loan)	9	(0)
2014–2019	MSV Duisburg	94	(4)
- * Club domestic league appearances and goals as of 15:46, 19 May 2019 (UTC)

Enis Ben Mohamed Hajri (born 6 March 1983) is a Tunisian professional footballer who plays as a defender or midfielder.

== Career ==
Hajri played for Chernomorets Burgas between 2009 and 2011 after being transferred from German FSV Oggersheim in 2009 for free. He also holds a German passport.

He transferred to Chinese Super League side Henan Jianye on 13 February 2012. On 10 March 2012, he made his official debut as a starter in a 3–1 away loss against Liaoning Whowin.

On 19 June 2012, Hajri moved to 2. Bundesliga side 1. FC Kaiserslautern on a free transfer, signing a three-year contract.

On 22 July 2013, he joined CS Sfaxien on a one-year loan deal. Two months later he signed for FC 08 Homburg on loan.

He joined MSV Duisburg for the 2014–15 season. He left Duisburg after the 2018–19 season.
