= Dustin Bomheuer =

German professional footballer

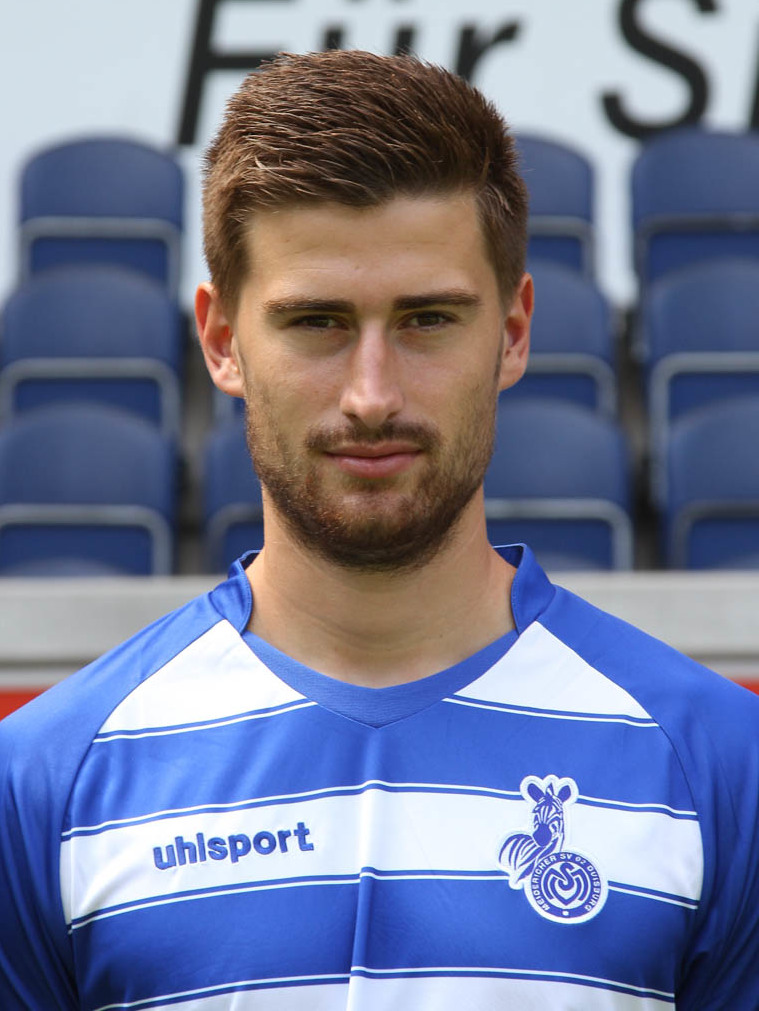
- Bomheuer in 2015

Personal information
- Date of birth: 17 April 1991 (age 35)
- Place of birth: Recklinghausen, Germany
- Height: 1.93 m (6 ft 4 in)
- Position: Centre back

Youth career
- 1994–2010: SG Wattenscheid 09

Senior career*
Years	Team	Apps	(Gls)
2010–2012	MSV Duisburg II	49	(2)
2012–2013	MSV Duisburg	25	(2)
2013–2015	Fortuna Düsseldorf	27	(0)
2013–2015	Fortuna Düsseldorf II	5	(0)
2015–2019	MSV Duisburg	100	(6)
2019–2021	1. FC Magdeburg	6	(0)
- * Club domestic league appearances and goals as of 15 August 2021

Dustin Bomheuer (born 17 April 1991) is a German professional footballer who plays as a defender. He is currently without a club.

== Career ==
Bomheuer played his first Bundesliga match for MSV Duisburg on 12 August 2012 in a 0–2 away loss against SSV Jahn Regensburg.

He signed a contract with Fortuna Düsseldorf in June 2013.

He returned to Duisburg for the 2015–16 season.
