= Tuğrul Erat =

Azerbaijani footballer (born 1992)

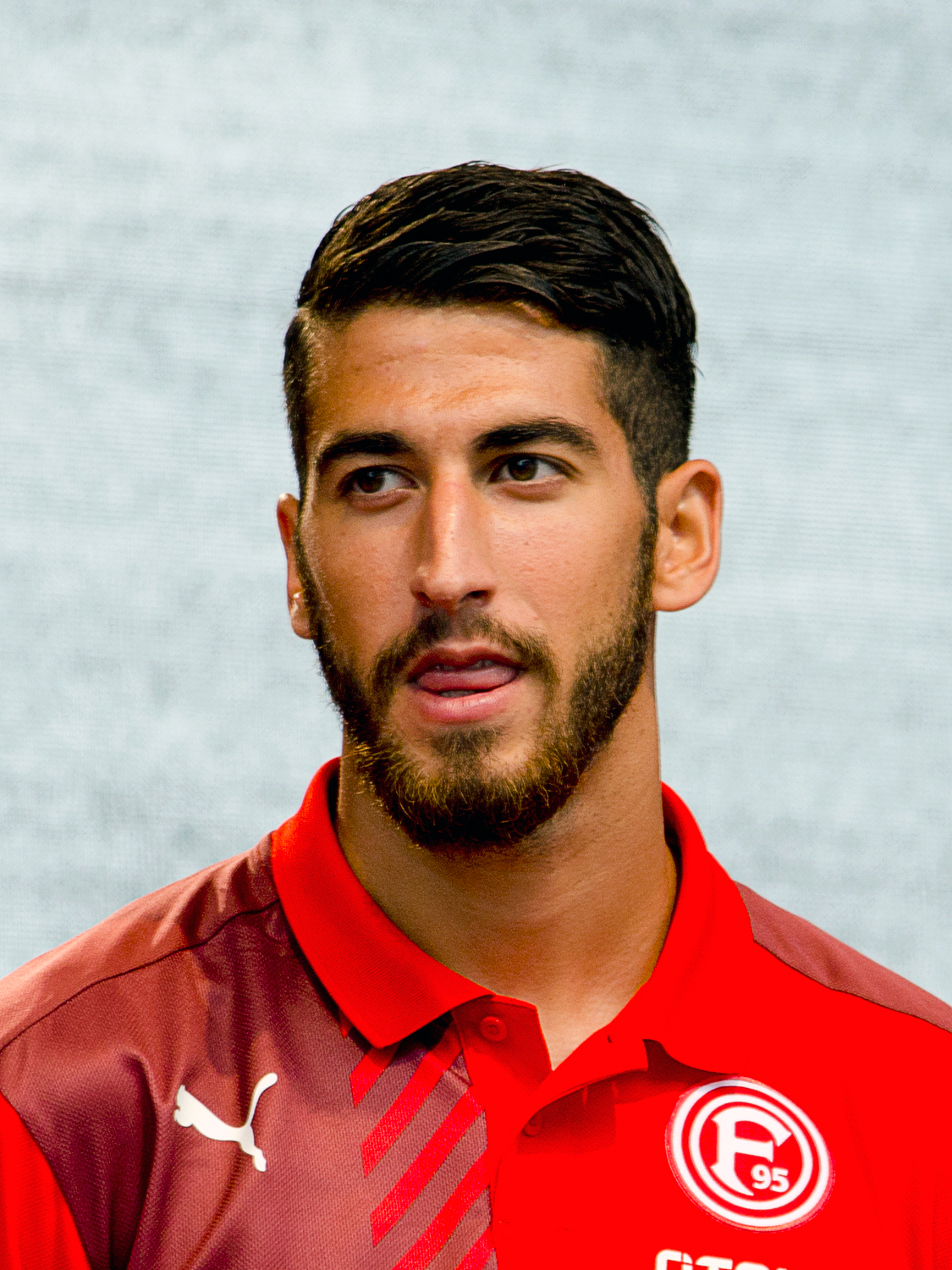
- Erat in 2015

Personal information
- Date of birth: 17 June 1992 (age 34)
- Place of birth: Nettetal, Germany
- Height: 1.93 m (6 ft 4 in)
- Position: Midfielder

Team information
- Current team: SC Union Nettetal
- Number: 67

Youth career
- 2009–2012: Fortuna Düsseldorf

Senior career*
Years	Team	Apps	(Gls)
2010–2016	Fortuna Düsseldorf II	118	(24)
2013–2016	Fortuna Düsseldorf	34	(2)
2016–2018	MSV Duisburg	30	(2)
2018–2019	SV 19 Straelen	5	(0)
2019	Fatih Karagümrük	10	(0)
2020	Bayrampaşa	7	(0)
2020–2022	Rot-Weiß Oberhausen	32	(2)
2022	Alemannia Aachen	11	(0)
2022–	SC Union Nettetal	35	(1)

International career^{‡}
2013–2014	Azerbaijan U21	6	(3)
2014–	Azerbaijan	4	(0)
- * Club domestic league appearances and goals as of 05:23, 4 July 2024 (UTC) ‡ National team caps and goals as of 28 March 2019

Tuğrul Erat (born 17 June 1992) is a footballer who plays as a midfielder for German Oberliga Niederrhein club SC Union Nettetal. Born in Germany, he represents Azerbaijan at international level.

== Club career ==
Erat made his 2. Bundesliga debut at 9 December 2013 against 1. FC Kaiserslautern. Five days later he scored his first professional goal in a 2. Bundesliga game against Energie Cottbus. On 9 June 2016, Erat signed a two-year contract with MSV Duisburg. On 9 May 2018, it was announced that he will leave Duisburg at the end of the 2017–18 season.

On 28 September 2018, Erat signed with SV 19 Straelen. He played five games for the club, before leaving on 9 January 2019 to join Turkish club Fatih Karagümrük.

On 15 July 2020, Erat signed with Rot-Weiß Oberhausen.

== International career ==
Born in Germany and of ethnic Turkish origin, Erat plays for the Azerbaijan national team internationally. He has said that "In Germany or Turkey, I had no chance of being recommended as a national player. I chose Azerbaijan because I like that I can gain international experience."
