= Andreas Wiegel =

German footballer (born 1991)

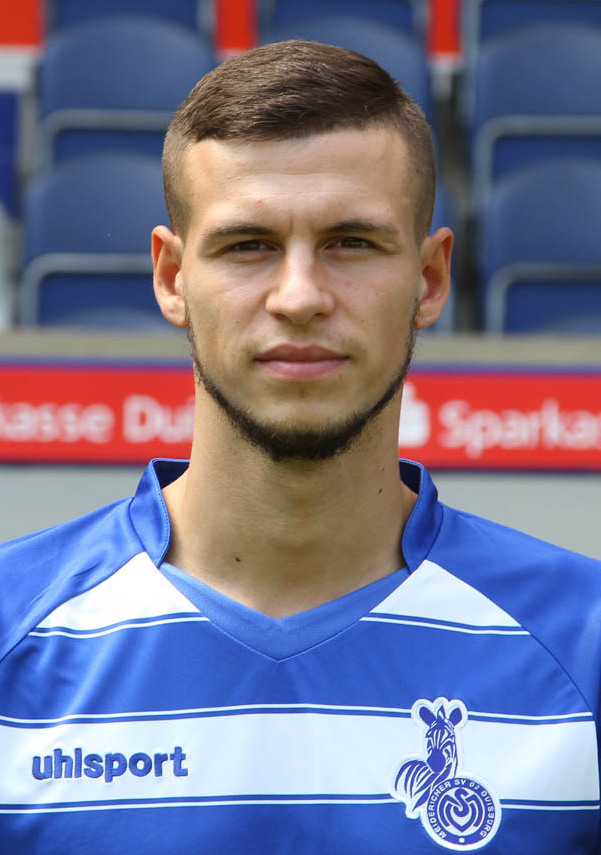
- Wiegel with MSV Duisburg in 2015

Personal information
- Date of birth: 21 July 1991 (age 35)
- Place of birth: Paderborn, Germany
- Height: 1.79 m (5 ft 10 in)
- Position: Winger

Team information
- Current team: Sportfreunde Lotte
- Number: 7

Youth career
- 1995–1998: SC Borchen
- 1998–2004: Fortuna Schlangen
- 2004–2006: SC Paderborn
- 2006–2010: Schalke 04

Senior career*
Years	Team	Apps	(Gls)
2009–2012	Schalke 04 II	53	(9)
2012–2014	Erzgebirge Aue	15	(1)
2012	→ Erzgebirge Aue II (loan)	6	(1)
2013	→ Rot-Weiß Erfurt (loan)	22	(2)
2013	→ Rot-Weiß Erfurt II (loan)	5	(1)
2014–2015	Rot-Weiß Erfurt	30	(5)
2015–2019	MSV Duisburg	75	(4)
2019–2021	Waasland-Beveren	37	(1)
2021–2022	BFC Dynamo	19	(2)
2022–2024	Rot-Weiss Essen	51	(2)
2024–	Sportfreunde Lotte	33	(0)

International career
2007	Germany U16	1	(0)
- * Club domestic league appearances and goals as of 24 June 2026

Andreas Wiegel (born 21 July 1991) is a German professional footballer who plays as a winger for Sportfreunde Lotte.

== Early life ==
Wiegel attended the Gesamtschule Berger Feld.

== Career ==
Wiegel signed a two-year senior contract until 2013 with Schalke 04 on 25 June 2011. However, his first senior appearance for the club would not come until 14 December when he traveled to Israel for the clubs Europa League clash against Israeli Premier League team Maccabi Haifa in which Schalke ran out 3–1 winners, with Wiegel scoring in the 92nd minute. In 2011–12, he was a regular player of Schalke's second team in their Regionalliga West campaign with 32 appearances but he had not been called up for a Bundesliga match of the first team.

In August 2012, Wiegel joined 2. Bundesliga side Erzgebirge Aue on a two-year contract. A year later he signed for Rot-Weiß Erfurt on loan, a move that was made permanent after one season.

He signed with MSV Duisburg for the 2015–16 season. He re-signed for two more years on 30 May 2018, which his contract running till Summer 2020. He left Duisburg after the 2018–19 season.

He joined Belgian club Waasland-Beveren on 20 July 2019.

On 12 October 2021, he returned to Germany and signed with BFC Dynamo.

On 1 October 2024, Wiegel joined Sportfreunde Lotte.
