= Zlatko Janjić =

Bosnian footballer (born 1986)

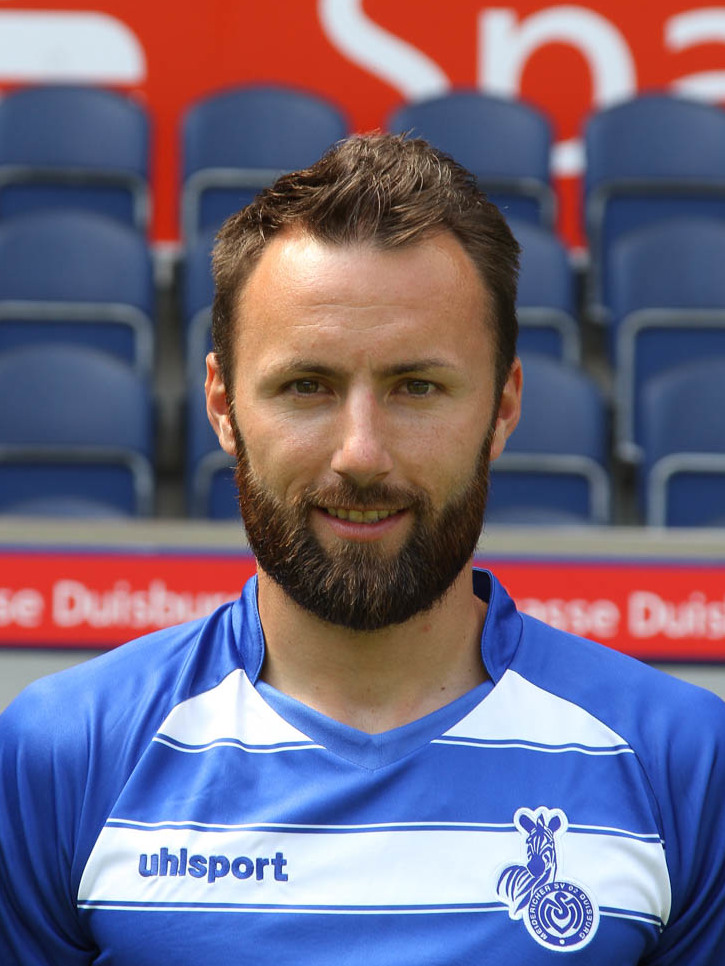
- Janjić in 2015

Personal information
- Date of birth: 7 May 1986 (age 40)
- Place of birth: Bosanska Gradiška, SFR Yugoslavia
- Height: 1.86 m (6 ft 1 in)
- Position: Forward

Youth career
- 1992–2001: TuS Jöllenbeck
- 2001–2006: Arminia Bielefeld

Senior career*
Years	Team	Apps	(Gls)
2004–2010	Arminia Bielefeld II	96	(40)
2008–2010	Arminia Bielefeld	42	(3)
2010–2013	Wehen Wiesbaden	98	(39)
2013–2014	Erzgebirge Aue	24	(1)
2014–2018	MSV Duisburg	91	(24)
2018–2019	Korona Kielce	31	(1)
2019	SG Sonnenhof Großaspach	11	(5)
2019–2021	SC Verl	56	(29)
2021–2022	Rot-Weiss Essen	34	(5)
Total		483	(147)
- * Club domestic league appearances and goals

Zlatko Janjić (born 7 May 1986) is a Bosnian former professional footballer who played a forward.

== Club career ==
Janjić made his Bundesliga debut for Arminia Bielefeld in 2008.

He joined MSV Duisburg for the 2014–15 season.

In early February 2018, Janjić moved to Polish side Korona Kielce. He played there until 31 January 2019, when he joined SG Sonnenhof Großaspach on a contract for the rest of the season.
