= 2012–13 Karlsruher SC season =

Karlsruher SC
2012–13 season
- Chairman: Ingo Wellenreuther
- Manager: Markus Kauczinski
- Stadium: Wildparkstadion, Karlsruhe, Germany
- 3. Fußball-Liga: 1st (promoted)
- DFB-Pokal: Round of 16
Home colours	Away colours	Third colours

The 2012–13 Karlsruher SC season is the 61st season in the club's football history. In 2012–13 the club plays in the 3. Liga, the third tier of German football. It is the club's first-ever season in this league, having been relegated from the 2. Fußball-Bundesliga in 2012.

The club also took part in the 2012–13 edition of the DFB-Pokal, the German Cup, where it reached the second round and will face 2. Bundesliga side MSV Duisburg next. The club had knocked out Bundesliga club Hamburger SV in the first round with a 4–2 victory.

Karlsruher SC also takes part in the 2012–13 edition of the North Baden Cup, having reached the second round against 1. FC Bruchsal after a 2–0 win over SpVgg Neckarelz in the first round.

== Matches ==
=== Legend ===
Win Draw Loss Postponed

=== 3. Liga ===
21 July 2012 1	1. FC Heidenheim	2–2	Karlsruher SC	Heidenheim an der Brenz
16:00	Heidenfelder (yellow card) 47'; Sirigu (yellow card) 74'; Schnatterer 81'; Göhlert (yellow card) 90+1'; Malura 90+3'	Report 1 Report 2 (in German)	Çalhanoğlu 13', 25'; Haas (yellow card) 60'	Stadium: Voith Arena; Attendance: 9,200; Referee: Tobias Stieler (Hamburg)

28 July 2012 2	Karlsruher SC	0–0	Hallescher FC	Karlsruhe
14:00	Haas (yellow card) 88'	Report 1 Report 2 (in German)	Mast (yellow card) 41'; Kanitz (yellow card) 90'	Stadium: Wildparkstadion; Attendance: 13,735; Referee: Frank Willenborg (Osnabrück)

4 August 2012 3	VfB Stuttgart II	2–0	Karlsruher SC	Stuttgart
14:00	Rathgeb 3'; Hemlein 29'; Benyamina (yellow card) 36'	Report 1 Report 2 (in German)	Cagara (yellow card) 44'; Schiek (yellow card) 72'; Haas (yellow card) 89'	Stadium: Mercedes-Benz Arena; Attendance: 19,970; Referee: Arne Aarnink (Nordhorn)

8 August 2012 4	Karlsruher SC	1–1	VfL Osnabrück	Karlsruhe
19:00	Silvano Varnhagen (yellow card) 13'; Çalhanoğlu 25'; Grimaldi (yellow card) 83'	Report 1 Report 2 (in German)	Hudec (yellow card) 6'; Manno (penalty missed) 24'; Zoller 49'; Klingmann (yellow card) 89'	Stadium: Wildparkstadion; Referee: Sascha Stegemann (Niederkassel)

11 August 2012 5	Arminia Bielefeld	1–0	Karlsruher SC	Bielefeld
14:00	Klos (yellow card) 24' (goal) 33'; Riemer (yellow card) 40'; Stoll (red card) 82'; Mauersberger (yellow card) 84'	Report (in German)	Silvano Varnhagen (yellow card) 35'; Haas (yellow card) 44'; Schönfeld (yellow card) 61'; Hille (yellow card) 84'	Stadium: Schüco Arena; Attendance: 8,094; Referee: Christian Dietz (Kronach)

25 August 2012 6	Karlsruher SC	0–0	Alemannia Aachen	Karlsruhe
14:00	Kempe (yellow card) 29'; Haas (yellow card) 48'	Report (in German)	Rösler (yellow card) 42'; Borg (yellow card) 84'; Fl. Müller (yellow card) 90'	Stadium: Wildparkstadion; Attendance: 11,436; Referee: Dennis Siebert (Berlin)

28 August 2012 7	Borussia Dortmund II	0–3	Karlsruher SC	Dortmund
19:00	Bakalorz (yellow card) 86'	Report (in German)	Hennings 51' van der Biezen 55', 62'	Stadium: Stadion Rote Erde; Attendance: 3,130; Referee: Karl Valentin (Taufkirchen)

2 September 2012 8	Karlsruher SC	3–0	1. FC Saarbrücken	Karlsruhe
14:00	Gordon 59'; Hennings 64'; Kempe (yellow card) 68' van der Biezen 78'	Report (in German)	Hayer (yellow card) 16'; Kohler (yellow card) 59'	Stadium: Wildparkstadion; Attendance: 14,317; Referee: Guido Winkmann (Kerken)

15 September 2012 9	Kickers Offenbach	1–1	Karlsruher SC	Offenbach
14:00	Husterer (yellow card) 42'; Mehić 59'; Stein (yellow card) 75'	Report (in German)	Haas (yellow card) 10'; Alibaz (yellow card) 13'; Hennings (yellow card) 64'; Çalhanoğlu 77'	Stadium: Sparda Bank Hessen Stadium; Attendance: 10,137; Referee: Michael Weiner (Giesen)

22 September 2012 10	Karlsruher SC	1–2	Wacker Burghausen	Karlsruhe
14:00	Hennings 32'; Haas (yellow card) 56'; Alibaz (yellow card) 68'	Report (in German)	Eberlein (yellow card) 15' (goal) 25'; Holz (yellow card) 44'; Schick (yellow card) 53'; Kulabas (yellow card) 63'; Senesie 78'	Stadium: Wildparkstadion; Attendance: 10,635; Referee: René Rohde (Rostock)

26 September 2012 11	Karlsruher SC	3–0	FC Rot-Weiß Erfurt	Karlsruhe
19:00	van der Biezen 46', 90+1'; Çalhanoğlu (yellow card) 47'; Kempe (yellow card) 60'; Hennings 81'	Report (in German)	Strangl (yellow card) 32' (yellow card) 39' (red card); Oumari (yellow card) 90'	Stadium: Wildparkstadion; Attendance: 9,965; Referee: Sören Storks (Velen)

24 October 2012 12	Stuttgarter Kickers	0–2	Karlsruher SC	Stuttgart
18:30	Dicklhuber (yellow card) 34'; Leutenecker (yellow card) 88'	Report (in German)	Alibaz 69'; Klingmann 35'; Peitz (yellow card) 37'; Kempe (yellow card) 53'; Gordon (yellow card) 75'	Stadium: Gazi-Stadion auf der Waldau; Attendance: 6,420; Referee: Tobias Christ (Münchweiler)

6 October 2012 13	Karlsruher SC	0–0	SpVgg Unterhaching	Karlsruhe
14:00	van der Biezen (yellow card) 51'; Silvano Varnhagen (yellow card) 68'	Report (in German)	Niederlechner (yellow card) 20'; Yılmaz (yellow card) 45'; Schwabl (yellow card) 64'	Stadium: Wildparkstadion; Attendance: 9,769; Referee: Thorsten Schriever (Dorum)

20 October 2012 14	SV Babelsberg 03	0–0	Karlsruher SC	Babelsberg
14:00	Hartmann (yellow card) 63' (yellow card) 74' (red card); Berzel (yellow card) 78'	Report (in German)	van der Biezen (yellow card) 31'; Hennings (yellow card) 85'	Stadium: Karl-Liebknecht-Stadion; Attendance: 4,357; Referee: Sven Jablonski (Bremen)

27 October 2012 15	Karlsruher SC	2–1	Preußen Münster	Karlsruhe
14:00	Hennings 14'; Gordon (red card) 74'; Çalhanoğlu 78'	Report (in German)	Taylor 53'; Bischoff (yellow card) 77'; Nazarov (yellow card) 78'; Hergesell (yellow card) 90'	Stadium: Wildparkstadion; Attendance: 9,244; Referee: Felix Brych (München)

3 November 2012 16	Chemnitzer FC	1–2	Karlsruher SC	Chemnitz
14:00	Fink 26'; Birk (yellow card) 36'; Bankert (yellow card) 82'	Report (in German)	Hennings 17'; Haas 24'; Peitz (yellow card) 42'; Kempe (yellow card) 62'	Stadium: Stadion an der Gellertstraße; Attendance: 4,900; Referee: Guido Winkmann (Kerken)

10 November 2012 17	Karlsruher SC	2–0	SV Darmstadt 98	Karlsruhe
14:00	Peitz (yellow card) 55'; Hennings 73'; Latza 75' (o.g.)	Report (in German)	Gorka (yellow card) 16'; Hesse (yellow card) 34'	Stadium: Wildparkstadion; Attendance: 10,219; Referee: Robert Kempter (Sauldorf)

17 November 2012 18	Hansa Rostock	0–3	Karlsruher SC	Rostock
14:00	Marcos (yellow card) 30'; Berger (yellow card) 43'; Leemans (yellow card) 65' (yellow-red card) 65'	Report (in German)	Peitz (yellow card) 27'; Mauersberger 53'; Kempe 78'; Soriano 84'	Stadium: DKB-Arena; Attendance: 10,000; Referee: Tobias Welz (Wiesbaden)

24 November 2012 19	Karlsruher SC	4–0	SV Wehen Wiesbaden	Karlsruhe
14:00	Gordon (yellow card) 4' (goal) 50'; Mauersberger 8' van der Biezen 57'; Hennings 68'	Report (in German)	Wohlfarth (yellow card) 74'	Stadium: Wildparkstadion; Attendance: 10,970; Referee: Sebastian Schmickartz (Berlin)

1 December 2012 20	Karlsruher SC	5–2	1. FC Heidenheim	Karlsruhe
14:00	van der Biezen 22', 49'; Mauersberger 59'; Hennings (yellow card) 66'; Çalhanoğlu 69'; Selcuk Alibaz 77'	Report (in German)	Titsch-Rivero 9' (yellow card) 33'; Schnatterer 56' (yellow card) 81'; Malura (yellow card) 68'; Bagceci (yellow card) 89'	Stadium: Wildparkstadion; Attendance: 11,082; Referee: Rene Rohde

8 December 2012 21	Hallescher FC	0–2	Karlsruher SC	Halle
14:00	Hauk (yellow card) 35'; Zeiger (yellow card) 45+1'; Eismann (yellow card) 48'	Report (in German)	Kempe (yellow card) 8'; Çalhanoğlu 13' van der Biezen 55'; Hennings (yellow card) 77'	Stadium: Erdgas Sportpark; Attendance: 6,162; Referee: Peter Gagelmann (Bremen)

15 December 2012 22	Karlsruher SC	3–1	VfB Stuttgart II	Karlsruhe
14:00	Dulleck 3'; Klingmann (yellow card) 27'; Peitz 51' van der Biezen (yellow card) 76'; Blum 90'	Report (in German)	van der Biezen 11' (pen.); Stöger (yellow card) 31'; Enderle (yellow card) 38'; Kiefer (yellow card) 28' (yellow card) 45' (red card); Vecchione (yellow card) 65'	Stadium: Wildparkstadion; Attendance: 13,113; Referee: Christian Dietz (Kronach)

26 January 2013 23	VfL Osnabrück	2–3	Karlsruher SC	Osnabrück
14:00	Rickert (red card); Manno 63'; Pisot 83'; Beerman (yellow card) 87'	Report (in German)	Çalhanoğlu 29' (pen.) 34'; Akpoguma (yellow card) 68'	Stadium: Osnatel Arena; Attendance: 11,400; Referee: Guido Winkmann (Kerken)

2 February 2013 24	Karlsruher SC	0–0	DSC Arminia Bielefeld	Karlsruhe
14:00	Blum (yellow card) 90' (red card)	Report (in German)	Hornig (yellow card) 10'; Lorenz (yellow card) 78'; Hübener (yellow card) 87'	Stadium: Wildparkstadion; Attendance: 11,460; Referee: Tobias Welz (Wiesbaden)

8 February 2013 25	Alemannia Aachen	0–4	Karlsruher SC	Aachen
19:00	Wilschrey (yellow card) 52'; Herröder (yellow card) 63'; Marquet (yellow card) 79'	Report (in German)	Hennings 36'; Van der Biezen 51'; Çalhanoğlu 53'; Varnhagen 57'	Stadium: New Tivoli; Attendance: 10,598; Referee: Bibiana Steinhaus (Hannover)

16 February 2013 26	Karlsruher SC	1–0	Borussia Dortmund II	Karlsruhe
14:00	Çalhanoğlu 3' (pen.)	Report (in German)	Knappmann (yellow card) 3'	Stadium: Wildparkstadion; Attendance: 11,917; Referee: Norbert Giese (Großräschen)

23 February 2013 27	1. FC Saarbrücken	0–0	Karlsruher SC	Saarbrücken
14:00		Report (in German)		Stadium: Ludwigsparkstadion; Attendance: 5,130; Referee: Thorben Siewer (Drolshagen)

2 March 2013 28	Karlsruher SC	2–1	Kickers Offenbach	Karlsruhe
14:00	van der Biezen 37'; Alibaz 71'	Report (in German)	Feldhahn 74'	Stadium: Wildparkstadion; Attendance: 11,712; Referee: Bastian Dankert (Rostock)

9 March 2013 29	Wacker Burghausen	1–2	Karlsruher SC	Burghausen
14:00	Mokhtari 22'; Schröck (yellow card) 50'	Report (in German)	Çalhanoğlu 10' (pen.); Alibaz 15'; Peitz (yellow card) 75'	Stadium: Wacker Arena; Attendance: 3,020; Referee: Markus Wingenbach (Mainz)

13 April 2013 30	Rot-Weiß Erfurt	0–1	Karlsruher SC	Erfurt
19:00	Ofosu-Ayeh (yellow card) 43'	Report (in German)	Gaetan Krebs 26'; Alibaz (yellow card) 73'	Stadium: Steigerwaldstadion; Attendance: 4,958; Referee: Thorben Siewer (Drolshagen)

30 March 2013 31	Karlsruher SC	3–0	Stuttgarter Kickers	Karlsruhe
14:00	Çalhanoğlu 31' (pen.); Klingmann 38'; Mauersberger 81'	Report (in German)	Auracher (yellow card) 36'	Stadium: Wildparkstadion; Attendance: 14,249; Referee: Arne Aarnink (Nordhorn)

6 April 2013 32	SpVgg Unterhaching	2–1	Karlsruher SC	Unterhaching
14:00	Yilmaz 5'; Haberer (yellow card) 17'; Yilmaz (yellow card) 43'	Report (in German)		Stadium: Stadion am Sportpark; Attendance: 3,400; Referee: Malte Dittrich (Bremen)

13 April 2013 33	Karlsruher SC	2–1	SV Babelsberg 03	Karlsruhe
14:00	Peitz 37' van der Biezen (yellow card) 60'; Dulleck 85'	Report (in German)	Essig (yellow card) 41'; Prochnow (yellow card) 58'; Kreuels 79'	Stadium: Wildparkstadion; Attendance: 12,102; Referee: Robert Hartmann (Wangen)

20 April 2013 34	Preußen Münster	2–1	Karlsruher SC	Münster
14:00	Taylor 7', 61'; Schmidt (yellow card) 22'; Bischoff (yellow card) 64'	Report (in German)	Gordon (yellow card) 64'; Peitz (yellow card) 71'; Krebs 74'	Stadium: Preußenstadion; Attendance: 14,465; Referee: Sascha Stegemann (Niederkassel)

26 April 2013 35	Karlsruher SC	4–1	Chemnitzer FC	Karlsruhe
19:00	Hennings (yellow card) 35' van der Biezen 38', 63'; Çalhanoğlu 42', 66'; Peitz (yellow card) 47'	Report (in German)	Hörnig (yellow card) 33'; Bankert (yellow card) 35'; Wachsmuth 62'; Jansen (yellow card) 80'	Stadium: Wildparkstadion; Attendance: 15396; Referee: Florian Meyer (Burgdorf)

5 May 2013 36	SV Darmstadt 98	0–1	Karlsruher SC	Darmstadt
14:00	Hübner (yellow card) 73'; Behrens (yellow card) 85'; Latza (yellow card) 89'; Zielinsky (yellow card) 90'	Report (in German)	Peitz (yellow card) 77'; Çalhanoğlu 89' (yellow card) 90'	Stadium: Stadion am Böllenfalltor; Attendance: 10300; Referee: Felix Brych (München)

11 May 2013 37	Karlsruher SC	1–1	Hansa Rostock	Karlsruhe
13:30	Kempe 74'	Report (in German)	Plat 18'; Trapp (yellow card) 25'	Stadium: Wildparkstadion; Attendance: 26175; Referee: Thorben Siewer (Drolshagen)

14 May 2013 38	SV Wehen Wiesbaden	2–4	Karlsruher SC	Wiesbaden
13:30	Vunguidica (yellow card) 59' (goal) 83'; Bieler 85'	Report (in German)	Kempe 13'; Peitz 18'; Çalhanoğlu 20'; Kern 72'	Stadium: Brita Arena; Attendance: 8,947; Referee: Patrick Alt (Heusweiler)

=== DFB-Pokal ===
19 August 2012 1st Round	Karlsruher SC	4–2	Hamburger SV	Karlsruhe
14:30 CEST (UTC+02:00)	Çalhanoğlu (yellow card) 22' van der Biezen 31'; Alibaz 58'; Stoll 78'; Soriano 86'	Report (in German)	23' Berg; 45+1' Beister; (yellow card) 60' Bruma	Stadium: Wildparkstadion; Attendance: 16.138; Referee: B. Dankert

31 October 2012 2nd Round	Karlsruher SC	1–0	MSV Duisburg	Karlsruhe
19:00	Silvano Varnhagen (yellow card) 56'; Kempe (yellow card) 77' (goal) 88'; Gordon (yellow card) 83'	Report (in German)	da Silva (yellow card) 17'; Borsinski (yellow card) 34'; Hoffmann (yellow card) 41'; Bomheuer (yellow card) 52'; Šukalo (yellow card) 56' (yellow card) 80' (red card); Wiedwald (red card) 90'	Stadium: Wildparkstadion; Attendance: 14,921; Referee: Tobias Stieler (Hamburg)

18 December 2012 Round of 16	Karlsruher SC	0–1	SC Freiburg	Karlsruhe
19:00	Hennings (yellow card) 45+1'; Kempe (yellow card) 61'; Peitz (yellow card) 79'	Report (in German)	Schmid 2'; Rosenthal (yellow card) 69'; Kruse (yellow card) 90'; Caligiuri (yellow card) 90+3'	Stadium: Wildparkstadion; Attendance: 28,200; Referee: Jochen Drees

== Squad ==
As of 25 November 2012

No.	Pos	Nat	Player	Total		3. Liga		DFB-Pokal	
No.	Pos	Nat	Player	Apps	Goals	Apps	Goals	Apps	Goals
1	GK	(Germany) GER	Dirk Orlishausen	0	0	0	0	0	0
14	GK	(Germany) GER	Mathias Moritz	0	0	0	0	0	0
2	DF	(Germany) GER	Philipp Klingmann	0	0	0	0	0	0
4	DF	(Germany) GER	Martin Stoll	0	0	0	0	0	0
5	DF	(Germany) GER	Dennis Kempe	0	0	0	0	0	0
6	DF	(Germany) GER	Jan Mauersberger	0	0	0	0	0	0
16	DF	(Philippines) PHI	Dennis Cagara	0	0	0	0	0	0
19	DF	(Germany) GER	Kevin Akpoguma	0	0	0	0	0	0
22	DF	(Germany) GER	Sebastian Schiek	0	0	0	0	0	0
3	MF	(Germany) GER	Daniel Gordon	0	0	0	0	0	0
8	MF	(Germany) GER	Manuel Bölstler	0	0	0	0	0	0
10	MF	(Turkey) TUR	Hakan Çalhanoğlu	0	0	0	0	0	0
13	MF	(Germany) GER	Dominic Peitz	0	0	0	0	0	0
15	MF	(Germany) GER	Christoph Sauter	0	0	0	0	0	0
18	MF	(Germany) GER	Steffen Haas	0	0	0	0	0	0
20	MF	(Turkey) TUR	Selçuk Alibaz	0	0	0	0	0	0
21	MF	(France) FRA	Gaëtan Krebs	0	0	0	0	0	0
23	MF	(Germany) GER	Timo Kern	0	0	0	0	0	0
25	MF	(Germany) GER	Danny Blum	0	0	0	0	0	0
26	MF	(Germany) GER	Silvano Varnhagen	0	0	0	0	0	0
7	FW	(Germany) GER	Patrick Dulleck	0	0	0	0	0	0
9	FW	(Germany) GER	Simon Brandstetter	0	0	0	0	0	0
11	FW	(Germany) GER	Elia Soriano	0	0	0	0	0	0
17	FW	(Germany) GER	Rouwen Hennings	0	0	0	0	0	0
24	FW	(Algeria) ALG	Karim Benyamina	0	0	0	0	0	0
28	FW	(Netherlands) NED	Koen van der Biezen	0	0	0	0	0	0
