= 2013–14 Karlsruher SC season =

Karlsruher SC
2013–14 season
- Chairman: Ingo Wellenreuther
- Manager: Markus Kauczinski
- Stadium: Wildparkstadion, Karlsruhe, Germany
- 2. Bundesliga: 5th
- DFB-Pokal: Round 1
Home colours	Away colours	Third colours

The 2013–14 Karlsruher SC season is the 62nd season in the club's football history. In 2013–14 the club plays in the 2. Bundesliga, the second tier of German football.

== Matches ==
=== Legend ===
Win Draw Loss Postponed

=== 2. Bundesliga ===
==== League fixtures and results ====
21 July 2013 1	FSV Frankfurt	0–1	Karlsruher SC	Frankfurt
13:30	Kapllani (yellow card) 23'; Konrad (yellow card) 79'; Schlicke (yellow card) 90'	Report (in German)	Peitz (yellow card) 46' (goal) 84'; Van der Biezen (yellow card) 90'	Stadium: Frankfurter Volksbank Stadion; Attendance: 8,016; Referee: Florian Meyer (Burgdorf)

27 July 2013 2	Karlsruher SC	0–0	FC St. Pauli	Karlsruhe
15:30		Report (in German)	Buchtmann (yellow card) 24'; Gonther (yellow card) 58'; Thorandt (yellow card) 90'	Stadium: Wildparkstadion; Attendance: 17667; Referee: Guido Winkmann (Kerken)

10 August 2013 3	FC Ingolstadt	0–2	Karlsruher SC	Ingolstadt
13:00	Buchner (yellow card) 46'	Report (in German)	Peitz (yellow card) 51'; Mitsanski 58'; Alibaz 64'	Stadium: Audi Sportpark; Attendance: 5687; Referee: Thorsten Schriever (Dorum)

16 August 2013 4	Karlsruher SC	1–2	Greuther Fürth	Karlsruhe
18:30	Vitzthum 39'; Van der Biezen (yellow card) 42'; Peitz (yellow card) 82'	Report (in German)	Sparv (yellow card) 44'; Weilandt (yellow card) 58'; Fürstner (yellow card) 67'; Kraus 75'; Drexler (yellow card) 80' (goal) 86'	Stadium: Wildparkstadion; Attendance: 18877; Referee: Bastian Dankert (Rostock)

23 August 2013 5	SV Sandhausen	1–1	Karlsruher SC	Sandhausen
18:30	Hübner (yellow card) 61', (goal) 88'	Report (in German)	Nazarov 57'; Gordon (yellow card) 58'	Stadium: Hardtwaldstadion; Attendance: 10600; Referee: Robert Kempter (Sauldorf)

1 September 2013 6	Karlsruher SC	1–1	VfR Aalen	Karlsruhe
13:30	Nazarov 7'; Peitz (yellow card) 45'; Mitsanski (yellow card) 54'	Report (in German)	Traut (yellow card) 6'; Lechleiter 39'	Stadium: Wildparkstadion; Attendance: 14534; Referee: Christian Leicher (Landshut)

13 September 2013 7	SC Paderborn	1–0	Karlsruher SC	Paderborn
18:30	Wurtz (yellow card) 2'; Krösche (yellow card) 39'; Kachunga 61'; Demme (yellow card) 62'; Ten Voorde (yellow card) 90'	Report (in German)	Peitz (yellow card) 36'; Van der Biezen (yellow card) 66'	Stadium: Benteler Arena; Attendance: 6890; Referee: Wolfgang Stark (Ergolding)

20 September 2013 8	Karlsruher SC	2–0	Energie Cottbus	Karlsruhe
1830	Van der Biezen 22' (pen.); Gordon 34'; Hennings (yellow card) 57'	Report (in German)	Fomitschow (yellow card) 3'; Buljat (yellow card) 19'; Möhrle (yellow card) 22'; Sanogo (yellow card) 43'	Stadium: Wildparkstadion; Attendance: 12,500; Referee: Christian Dietz (Kronach)

27 September 2013 9	Erzebirge Aue	3–0	Karlsruher SC	Aue
18:30	Koçer 9', (yellow card) 37'; Sylvestr 28'; Benatelli 51'; Miatke (yellow card) 56'; Schröder (yellow card) 67'	Report (in German)	Kempe (yellow card) 18'; Peitz (yellow card) 67'	Stadium: Erzgebirgsstadion; Attendance: 7,050; Referee: Benjamin Brand (Gerolzhofen)

5 October 2013 10	Karlsruher SC	1–2	1. FC Köln	Karlsruhe
13:00	Varnhagen (yellow card) 30'; Van der Biezen (yellow card) 43', (goal) 52'; Krebs (yellow card) 43'	Report	Helmes 59'; Brečko 90'	Stadium: Wildparkstadion; Attendance: 20,233; Referee: Felix Zwayer (Berlin)

20 October 2013 11	1. FC Kaiserslautern	2–2	Karlsruher SC	Kaiserslautern
13:30	Šimůnek 20'; Löwe (yellow card) 33'; Idrissou (yellow card) 44'; Orban 62'; Dick (yellow card) 88'	Report (in German)	Torres 40'; Kempe (yellow card) 42'; Nazarov (yellow card) 61'; Van der Biezen 74'; Peitz (yellow card) 78'; Yabo (yellow card) 86'	Stadium: Fritz Walter Stadion; Attendance: 45,293; Referee: Günter Perl (Pullach)

27 October 2013 12	Karlsruher SC	2–1	1860 Munich	Karlsruhe
13:30	Alibaz 16'; Vallori 22' (o.g.); Torres (yellow card) 62'	Report (in German)	Stoppelkamp 85'	Stadium: Wildparkstadion; Attendance: 16,527; Referee: Tobias Welz (Wiesbaden)

3 November 2013 13	Karlsruher SC	3–1	Arminia Bielefeld	Karlsruhe
13:30	Kempe (yellow card) 5'; Nazarov (yellow card) 27'; Van der Biezen 64', 90'; Peitz 70'; Yabo (yellow card) 85'	Report (in German)	Achahbar 48'; Salger (yellow card) 65'; Jerat (yellow card) 72'; Schütz (yellow card) 77'	Stadium: Wildparkstadion; Attendance: 12,445; Referee: Christian Bandurski (Oberhausen)

9 November 2013 14	Union Berlin	0–0	Karlsruher SC	Berlin
13:00	Terodde (yellow card) 26'; Kohlmann (yellow card) 76'	Report	Kempe (yellow card) 72'	Stadium: Stadion An der Alten Försterei; Attendance: 20,757; Referee: Robert Kampka

24 November 2013 15	Karlsruher SC	3–0	Dynamo Dresden	Karlsruhe
13:30	Klingmann 8', 72'; Van der Biezen 20'	Report (in German)	Poté (yellow card) 46'	Stadium: Wildparkstadion; Attendance: 16,520; Referee: Sascha Stegemann (Niederkassel)

29 November 2013 16	Fortuna Düsseldorf	0–2	Karlsruher SC	Düsseldorf
18:30	Weber (yellow card) 37'; Latka (yellow card) 53'; Bolly (red card) 69'; Halloran (yellow card) 82'	Report (in German)	Alibaz 28'; Torres (yellow card) 54'; Peitz 71'	Stadium: Esprit Arena; Attendance: 27,453; Referee: Peter Sippel (München)

6 December 2013 17	Karlsruher SC	0–0	VfL Bochum	Karlsruhe
18:30	Peitz (yellow card) 64'; Kempe (yellow card) 72'	Report (in German)	Tiffert (yellow card) 81'	Stadium: Wildparkstadion; Attendance: 13,278; Referee: Tobias Christ (Münchweiler an der Rodalb)

15 December 2013 18	Karlsruher SC	3–3	FSV Frankfurt	Karlsruhe
13:30	Mitsanski 8', 32', (yellow card) 32'; Hennings 28'; Gordon (yellow card) 51'; Varnhagen (yellow card) 80'; Van der Biezen (yellow card) 83'	Report (in German)	Klandt (yellow card) 8'; Djengoue (yellow card) 26'; Görlitz (yellow card) 45'; Yelen 65', 87'; Kapllani 83' (pen.)	Stadium: Wildparkstadion; Attendance: 13500; Referee: Michael Weiner (Giesen)

20 December 2013 19	FC St. Pauli	0–2	Karlsruher SC	St. Pauli
18:30	Schachten (yellow card) 22'; Halstenberg (yellow card) 70'; Buchtmann (yellow card) 81'; Verhoek (yellow card) 85'	Report (in German)	Kempe (yellow card) 6'; Peitz (yellow card) 53'; Gordon (yellow card) 58'; Mitsanski 63'; Nazarov (yellow card) 79'; Torres 84'; Schwertfeger (yellow card) 88'	Stadium: Millerntor Stadion; Attendance: 29,063; Referee: Felix Brych (München)

9 February 2014 20	Karlsruher SC	1–1	FC Ingolstadt	Karlsruhe
13:30	Van der Biezen 19'; Peitz (yellow card) 80'; Nazarov (red card) 90'	Report (in German)	Hartmann 43'; Roger (yellow card) 64'; Engel (yellow card) 90'; Cohen (red card) 90'	Stadium: Wildparkstadion; Attendance: 14,010; Referee: Markus Wingenbach (Mainz)

14 February 2014 21	Greuther Fürth	1–1	Karlsruher SC	Fürth
18:30	Fürstner (yellow card) 24'; Baba (yellow card) 34'; Röcker 82'	Report (in German)	Yabo 19'; Alibaz (yellow card) 38'; Torres (yellow card) 50'	Stadium: Trolli Arena; Attendance: 11,235; Referee: Thorsten Kinhöfer (Herne)

23 February 2014 22	Karlsruher SC	2–1	SV Sandhausen	Karlsruhe
13:00	Peitz 51', (yellow card) 59'; Hennings 79'	Report (in German)	Kister (yellow card) 13'; Stiefler (yellow card) 26'; Hübner (red card) 72'; Riemann (yellow card) 73'; Adler 86'	Stadium: Wildparkstadion; Attendance: 13,322; Referee: Christian Leicher (Landshut)

2 March 2014 23	VfR Aalen	1–0	Karlsruher SC	Aalen
13:30	Hübner 51'	Report (in German)	Hennings (yellow card) 28'; Torres (yellow card) 45'; Kempe (yellow card) 70'	Stadium: Scholz Arena; Attendance: 8,729; Referee: Peter Gagelmann (Bremen)

9 March 2014 24	Karlsruher SC	4–0	SC Paderborn	Karlsruhe
13:30	Torres 12', (yellow card) 83'; Nazarov 69', 84'; Van der Biezen 87'	Report (in German)	Bertels (yellow card) 33'; Koç (yellow card) 74'	Stadium: Wildparkstadion; Attendance: 15,601; Referee: Guido Winkmann (Kerken)

14 March 2014 25	Energie Cottbus	1–0	Karlsruher SC	Cottbus
13:00	Banović (yellow card) 13'; Sanogo 80' (pen.); Jendrišek (yellow card) 90'	Report (in German)	Schwertfeger (yellow card) 23'; Peitz (yellow card) 62'	Stadium: Stadion der Freundschaft; Attendance: 8,366; Referee: Patrick Ittrich (Hamburg)

23 March 2014 26	Karlsruher SC	1–1	Erzgebirge Aue	Karlsruhe
13:30	Krebs 13'; Mauersberger (yellow card) 61'	Report (in German)	Nickenig (yellow card) 37'; Okoronkwo 68'; Novikovas (yellow card) 73'	Stadium: Wildparkstadion; Attendance: 12,782; Referee: René Rohde (Rostock)

26 March 2014 27	1. FC Köln	2–0	Karlsruher SC	Köln
17:30	Brečko 29'; Helmes 58'	Report (in German)		Stadium: RheinEnergieStadion; Attendance: 46,700; Referee: Markus Schmidt (Stuttgart)

29 March 2014 28	Karlsruher SC	2–2	1. FC Kaiserslautern	Karlsruhe
13:00	Torres 26'; Alibaz (yellow card) 32'; Krebs (yellow card) 37'; Nazarov 89'	Report (in German)	Alushi (yellow card) 3'; Sippel (yellow card) 32'; Zoller 53', 67', (yellow card) 68'; Torrejón (yellow card) 62'; Occéan (yellow card) 90'	Stadium: Wildparkstadion; Attendance: 27,522; Referee: Manuel Gräfe (Berlin)

6 April 2014 29	1860 Munich	0–3	Karlsruher SC	Munich
13:30	Schwabl (yellow card) 64'	Report (in German)	Hennings 19', 32', 53'; Yabo (yellow card) 27'; Park (yellow card) 64'	Stadium: Allianz Arena; Attendance: 19,100; Referee: Thorsten Kinhöfer (Herne)

12 April 2014 30	Arminia Bielefeld	0–0	Karlsruher SC	Bielefeld
13:00	Schütz (yellow card) 38'; Klos (yellow card) 43'	Report (in German)	Park (yellow card) 24'; Klingmann (yellow card) 33'; Yabo (yellow card) 82'; Mauersberger (yellow card) 88'	Stadium: Bielefelder Alm; Attendance: 14,349; Referee: Thorsten Schriever (Dorum)

20 April 2014 31	Karlsruher SC	3–2	Union Berlin	Karlsruhe
13:00	Krebs 56'; Orlishausen (yellow card) 62'; Schwertfeger 71'; Hennings 76'; Gordon (yellow card) 77'	Report (in German)	Brandy (yellow card) 14'; Köhler 62' (pen.); Mattuschka 78' (pen.)	Stadium: Wildparkstadion; Attendance: 15,557; Referee: Knut Kircher (Hirschau)

27 April 2014 32	Dynamo Dresden	2–2	Karlsruher SC	Dresden
13:30	Brégerie 41' (pen.); Dedić 75'; Koch (yellow card) 87'; Schulz (red card) 90'	Report (in German)	Hennings 6' (pen.), (yellow card) 88'; Mauersberger 55'; Peitz (yellow card) 83'	Stadium: Glücksgas Stadion; Attendance: 28,963; Referee: Martin Petersen (Stuttgart)

4 May 2014 33	Karlsruher SC	2–2	Fortuna Düsseldorf	Karlsruhe
15:30	Hennings 22', 68' (pen.), (yellow card) 45'; Krebs (yellow card) 30'; Klingmann (yellow card) 52'; Gordon (yellow card) 84'	Report (in German)	Hoffer 18'; Bodzek 44'; Halloran (yellow card) 69'	Stadium: Wildparkstadion; Attendance: 21,907; Referee: Thorsten Kinhöfer (Herne)

11 May 2014 34	VfL Bochum	1–0	Karlsruher SC	Bochum
13:30	Zahirović 62'	Report (in German)	Gulde (yellow card) 25'	Stadium: rewirpowerSTADION; Attendance: 14,282; Referee: Günter Perl (Pullach)

==== League table ====
Pos	Team	Pld	W	D	L	GF	GA	GD	Pts	Promotion, qualification or relegation
3	SpVgg Fürth	34	17	9	8	64	38	+26	60	Qualification to promotion play-offs
4	1. FC Kaiserslautern	34	15	9	10	55	39	+16	54	
5	Karlsruher SC	34	12	14	8	47	34	+13	50	
6	Fortuna Düsseldorf	34	13	11	10	45	44	+1	50	
7	1860 Munich	34	13	9	12	38	41	−3	48	

Source: kicker.de
Rules for classification: 1) points; 2) goal difference; 3) number of goals scored.

=== DFB-Pokal ===
3 August 2013	Karlsruher SC	1–3	VfL Wolfsburg	Karlsruhe
20:30	Peitz (yellow card) 49'; Alibaz (yellow card) 53', (goal) 90'	Report	Perišić (yellow card) 4', (goal) 15'; Klose (yellow card) 13'; Diego 69'; Schäfer 90'	Stadium: Wildparkstadion; Attendance: 15710; Referee: Dr. Jochen Drees (Münster-Sarmsheim)
