= 2014–15 Bundesliga =

52nd season of the Bundesliga

Bundesliga
- Season: 2014–15
- Dates: 22 August 2014 – 23 May 2015
- Champions: Bayern Munich; 24th Bundesliga title 25th German title
- Relegated: SC Freiburg; SC Paderborn 07
- Champions League: Bayern Munich; VfL Wolfsburg; Borussia Mönchengladbach; Bayer Leverkusen
- Europa League: FC Augsburg; Schalke 04; Borussia Dortmund
- Matches: 306
- Goals: 843 (2.75 per match)
- Top goalscorer: Alexander Meier (19 goals)
- Biggest home win: Bayern Munich 8–0 Hamburger SV (14 February 2015)
- Biggest away win: SC Paderborn 07 0–6 Bayern Munich (21 February 2015)
- Highest scoring: Eintracht Frankfurt 4–5 VfB Stuttgart (25 October 2014); Bayer Leverkusen 4–5 VfL Wolfsburg (14 February 2015)
- Longest winning run: 8 matches Bayern Munich
- Longest unbeaten run: 17 matches Bayern Munich
- Longest winless run: 16 matches Hannover 96
- Longest losing run: 5 matches Borussia Dortmund; Hamburger SV
- Highest attendance: 80,667; Borussia Dortmund 0–2 Bayer Leverkusen (23 August 2014)
- Lowest attendance: 14,401; SC Paderborn 0–0 1899 Hoffenheim (21 March 2015)
- Average attendance: 43,527

The 2014–15 Bundesliga was the 52nd season of the Bundesliga, Germany's premier football competition. The season started on 22 August 2014 and the final matchday took place on 23 May 2015. Bayern Munich won their 25th German title on 26 April 2015.

== Background ==
Bayern Munich came into the season as defending champions, winning the championship on 25 March 2014 against Hertha BSC. Armin Veh announced that he was leaving Eintracht Frankfurt during the 2013–14 season. He had demanded that the club invest more money in the squad. Thomas Schaaf replaced Veh.

Bayer Leverkusen sacked Sami Hyypiä during the 2013–14 season. Sascha Lewandowski was named interim manager. Lewandowski's interim reign lasted until the end of the season when Roger Schmidt took over. Other managerial changes include Kasper Hjulmand replacing Thomas Tuchel at 1. FSV Mainz 05 and Armin Veh replacing Huub Stevens at VfB Stuttgart. Every club received their licence. The league schedule came out on 24 June with Bayern Munich facing VfL Wolfsburg in the opening fixture on 22 August. The match ended 2–1 win for Bayern Munich, a record third straight win for the home team, on the opening matchday, in the last three seasons.

== Teams ==
Locations of the 2014–15 Fußball-Bundesliga teams

18 teams comprise the league. 15 sides qualified directly from the 2013–14 season and two sides were directly promoted from the 2013–14 2. Fußball-Bundesliga season: 1. FC Köln and SC Paderborn 07. The final participant was decided by a two-legged play-off, in which 16th-placed Bundesliga club Hamburger SV defeated third-place finisher in 2. Bundesliga, SpVgg Greuther Fürth.

=== Stadiums and locations ===
Team	Location	Stadium	Capacity
FC Augsburg	Augsburg	SGL arena	30,660
Bayer Leverkusen	Leverkusen	BayArena	30,210
Bayern Munich	Munich	Allianz Arena	75,000
Borussia Dortmund	Dortmund	Signal Iduna Park	80,645
Borussia Mönchengladbach	Mönchengladbach	Stadion im Borussia-Park	54,010
Eintracht Frankfurt	Frankfurt	Commerzbank-Arena	51,500
SC Freiburg	Freiburg	Schwarzwald-Stadion	24,000
Hamburger SV	Hamburg	Imtech Arena	57,000
Hannover 96	Hanover	HDI-Arena	49,000
Hertha BSC	Berlin	Olympiastadion	74,244
TSG 1899 Hoffenheim	Sinsheim	Rhein-Neckar Arena	30,150
1. FC Köln	Cologne	RheinEnergieStadion	50,000
1. FSV Mainz 05	Mainz	Coface Arena	34,000
SC Paderborn 07	Paderborn	Benteler Arena	15,000
Schalke 04	Gelsenkirchen	Veltins-Arena	61,973
VfB Stuttgart	Stuttgart	Mercedes-Benz Arena	60,441
Werder Bremen	Bremen	Weserstadion	42,100
VfL Wolfsburg	Wolfsburg	Volkswagen Arena	30,000

=== Personnel and kits ===
Team	Manager	Captain	Kit manufacturer	Shirt sponsor
FC Augsburg	(Germany) Markus Weinzierl	(Netherlands) Paul Verhaegh	Nike	AL-KO
Bayer Leverkusen	(Germany) Roger Schmidt	(Germany) Simon Rolfes	adidas	LG Electronics
Bayern Munich	(Spain) Pep Guardiola	(Germany) Philipp Lahm	adidas	Deutsche Telekom
Borussia Dortmund	(Germany) Jürgen Klopp	(Germany) Mats Hummels	Puma	Evonik
Borussia Mönchengladbach	(Switzerland) Lucien Favre	(Belgium) Filip Daems	Kappa	Postbank
Eintracht Frankfurt	(Germany) Thomas Schaaf	(Germany) Kevin Trapp	Nike	Alfa Romeo
SC Freiburg	(Germany) Christian Streich	(Germany) Julian Schuster	Nike	Ehrmann
Hamburger SV	(Germany) Bruno Labbadia	(Netherlands) Rafael van der Vaart	adidas	Fly Emirates
Hannover 96	(Germany) Michael Frontzeck	(Germany) Lars Stindl	Jako	Heinz von Heiden
Hertha BSC	(Hungary) Pál Dárdai	(Switzerland) Fabian Lustenberger	Nike	Deutsche Bahn
TSG 1899 Hoffenheim	(Germany) Markus Gisdol	(Germany) Andreas Beck	Lotto	SAP
1. FC Köln	(Austria) Peter Stöger	(Slovenia) Mišo Brečko	Erima	REWE
1. FSV Mainz 05	(Switzerland) Martin Schmidt	(North Macedonia) Nikolče Noveski	Nike	Entega
SC Paderborn 07	(Germany) André Breitenreiter	(Germany) Uwe Hünemeier	Saller	kfzteile24
Schalke 04	(Italy) Roberto Di Matteo	(Germany) Benedikt Höwedes	adidas	Gazprom
VfB Stuttgart	(Netherlands) Huub Stevens	(Germany) Christian Gentner	Puma	Mercedes-Benz Bank
Werder Bremen	(Ukraine) Viktor Skrypnyk	(Germany) Clemens Fritz	Nike	Wiesenhof
VfL Wolfsburg	(Germany) Dieter Hecking	(Switzerland) Diego Benaglio	Kappa	Volkswagen

== Managerial changes ==
Team	Outgoing	Manner	Date	Position in table	Incoming	Date	Ref.
Eintracht Frankfurt	(Germany) Armin Veh	End of contract	30 June 2014 (Note: Announced on 3 March 2014)	Pre–season	(Germany) Thomas Schaaf	21 May 2014	
Mainz 05	(Germany) Thomas Tuchel	Stepped down	11 May 2014	Pre–season	(Denmark) Kasper Hjulmand	15 May 2014	
Bayer Leverkusen	(Germany) Sascha Lewandowski	End of caretaker assignment	30 June 2014	Pre–season	(Germany) Roger Schmidt	1 July 2014 (Note: Announced on 25 April 2014)	
VfB Stuttgart	(Netherlands) Huub Stevens	End of contract	30 June 2014 (Note: Announced on 10 May 2014)	Pre–season	(Germany) Armin Veh	1 July 2014 (Note: Announced on 12 May 2014)	
Hamburger SV	(Germany) Mirko Slomka	Sacked	15 September 2014	18th	(Germany) Josef Zinnbauer	16 September 2014	
Schalke 04	(Germany) Jens Keller	Sacked	7 October 2014	11th	(Italy) Roberto Di Matteo	7 October 2014	
Werder Bremen	(Germany) Robin Dutt	Sacked	25 October 2014	18th	(Ukraine) Viktor Skrypnyk	25 October 2014	
VfB Stuttgart	(Germany) Armin Veh	Resigned	24 November 2014	18th	(Netherlands) Huub Stevens	25 November 2014	
Hertha BSC	(Netherlands) Jos Luhukay	Sacked	5 February 2015	17th	(Hungary) Pál Dárdai	6 February 2015	
Mainz 05	(Denmark) Kasper Hjulmand	Sacked	17 February 2015	14th	(Switzerland) Martin Schmidt	17 February 2015	
Hamburger SV	(Germany) Josef Zinnbauer	Sacked	22 March 2015	16th	(Germany) Bruno Labbadia	15 April 2015	
Hannover 96	(Turkey) Tayfun Korkut	Sacked	20 April 2015	15th	(Germany) Michael Frontzeck	20 April 2015	

== League table ==
Pos	Team	Pld	W	D	L	GF	GA	GD	Pts	Qualification or relegation
1	Bayern Munich (C)	34	25	4	5	80	18	+62	79	Qualification for the Champions League group stage
2	VfL Wolfsburg	34	20	9	5	72	38	+34	69	Qualification for the Champions League group stage
3	Borussia Mönchengladbach	34	19	9	6	53	26	+27	66	Qualification for the Champions League group stage
4	Bayer Leverkusen	34	17	10	7	62	37	+25	61	Qualification for the Champions League play-off round
5	FC Augsburg	34	15	4	15	43	43	0	49	Qualification for the Europa League group stage (Note: Since the winners of the 2014–15 DFB-Pokal, VfL Wolfsburg, qualified for the Champions League based on league position, the Europa League group stage spot was passed to the sixth-placed team, Schalke 04; and the Europa League third qualifying round spot was passed to the seventh-placed team, Borussia Dortmund.)
6	Schalke 04	34	13	9	12	42	40	+2	48	Qualification for the Europa League group stage
7	Borussia Dortmund	34	13	7	14	47	42	+5	46	Qualification for the Europa League third qualifying round
8	1899 Hoffenheim	34	12	8	14	49	55	−6	44	
9	Eintracht Frankfurt	34	11	10	13	56	62	−6	43	
10	Werder Bremen	34	11	10	13	50	65	−15	43	
11	Mainz 05	34	9	13	12	45	47	−2	40	
12	1. FC Köln	34	9	13	12	34	40	−6	40	
13	Hannover 96	34	9	10	15	40	56	−16	37	
14	VfB Stuttgart	34	9	9	16	42	60	−18	36	
15	Hertha BSC	34	9	8	17	36	52	−16	35	
16	Hamburger SV (O)	34	9	8	17	25	50	−25	35	Qualification for the relegation play-offs
17	SC Freiburg (R)	34	7	13	14	36	47	−11	34	Relegation to 2. Bundesliga
18	SC Paderborn (R)	34	7	10	17	31	65	−34	31	Relegation to 2. Bundesliga

Source: DFB
Rules for classification: 1) points; 2) goal difference; 3) number of goals scored
(C) Champions; (O) Play-off winners; (R) Relegated

== Results ==
Home \ Away	FCA	BSC	SVW	BVB	SGE	SCF	HSV	H96	TSG	KOE	B04	M05	BMG	FCB	SCP	S04	VFB	WOB
FC Augsburg	—	1–0	4–2	2–3	2–2	2–0	3–1	1–2	3–1	0–0	2–2	0–2	2–1	0–4	3–0	0–0	2–1	1–0
Hertha BSC	1–0	—	2–2	1–0	0–0	0–2	3–0	0–2	0–5	0–0	0–1	1–3	1–2	0–1	2–0	2–2	3–2	1–0
Werder Bremen	3–2	2–0	—	2–1	1–0	1–1	1–0	3–3	1–1	0–1	2–1	0–0	0–2	0–4	4–0	0–3	2–0	3–5
Borussia Dortmund	0–1	2–0	3–2	—	2–0	3–1	0–1	0–1	1–0	0–0	0–2	4–2	1–0	0–1	3–0	3–0	2–2	2–2
Eintracht Frankfurt	0–1	4–4	5–2	2–0	—	1–0	2–1	2–2	3–1	3–2	2–1	2–2	0–0	0–4	4–0	1–0	4–5	1–1
SC Freiburg	2–0	2–2	0–1	0–3	4–1	—	0–0	2–2	1–1	1–0	0–0	2–3	0–0	2–1	1–2	2–0	1–4	1–2
Hamburger SV	3–2	0–1	2–0	0–0	1–2	1–1	—	2–1	1–1	0–2	1–0	2–1	1–1	0–0	0–3	2–0	0–1	0–2
Hannover 96	2–0	1–1	1–1	2–3	1–0	2–1	2–0	—	1–2	1–0	1–3	1–1	0–3	1–3	1–2	2–1	1–1	1–3
1899 Hoffenheim	2–0	2–1	1–2	1–1	3–2	3–3	3–0	4–3	—	3–4	0–1	2–0	1–4	0–2	1–0	2–1	2–1	1–1
1. FC Köln	1–2	1–2	1–1	2–1	4–2	0–1	0–0	1–1	3–2	—	1–1	0–0	0–0	0–2	0–0	2–0	0–0	2–2
Bayer Leverkusen	1–0	4–2	3–3	0–0	1–1	1–0	4–0	4–0	2–0	5–1	—	0–0	1–1	2–0	2–2	1–0	4–0	4–5
Mainz 05	2–1	0–2	1–2	2–0	3–1	2–2	1–2	0–0	0–0	2–0	2–3	—	2–2	1–2	5–0	2–0	1–1	1–1
Borussia Mönchengladbach	1–3	3–2	4–1	3–1	1–3	1–0	1–0	2–0	3–1	1–0	3–0	1–1	—	0–0	2–0	4–1	1–1	1–0
Bayern Munich	0–1	1–0	6–0	2–1	3–0	2–0	8–0	4–0	4–0	4–1	1–0	2–0	0–2	—	4–0	1–1	2–0	2–1
SC Paderborn	2–1	3–1	2–2	2–2	3–1	1–1	0–3	2–0	0–0	0–0	0–3	2–2	1–2	0–6	—	1–2	1–2	1–3
Schalke 04	1–0	2–0	1–1	2–1	2–2	0–0	0–0	1–0	3–1	1–2	0–1	4–1	1–0	1–1	1–0	—	3–2	3–2
VfB Stuttgart	0–1	0–0	3–2	2–3	3–1	2–2	2–1	1–0	0–2	0–2	3–3	2–0	0–1	0–2	0–0	0–4	—	0–4
VfL Wolfsburg	1–0	2–1	2–1	2–1	2–2	3–0	2–0	2–2	3–0	2–1	4–1	3–0	1–0	4–1	1–1	1–1	3–1	—

Source: DFB
Legend: Blue = home team win; Yellow = draw; Red = away team win.

== Relegation play-offs ==
The team which finishes 16th, will face the third-placed 2014–15 2. Bundesliga side for a two-legged play-off. The winner on aggregate score after both matches earns entry into the 2015–16 Bundesliga. Hamburger SV prevailed for the second year in a row, avoiding their possible first relegation.

=== First leg ===
28 May 2015
20:30 CEST

Hamburger SV	1–1	Karlsruher SC
Iličević 73'	Report	Hennings 4'

Volksparkstadion, Hamburg
Attendance: 56,615
Referee: Deniz Aytekin

Hamburger SV	Karlsruher SC

GK	15	(Germany) René Adler
RB	4	(Germany) Heiko Westermann	(yellow card) 26'	(substituted off) 56'
CB	5	(Switzerland) Johan Djourou (c)
CB	32	(Serbia) Slobodan Rajković
LB	22	(Germany) Matthias Ostrzolek
CM	40	(Serbia) Gojko Kačar	(yellow card) 83'
CM	20	(Chile) Marcelo Díaz
RW	8	(Croatia) Ivica Olić		(substituted off) 89'
AM	18	(Germany) Lewis Holtby	(yellow card) 59'	(substituted off) 69'
LW	11	(Croatia) Ivo Iličević
CF	10	(Germany) Pierre-Michel Lasogga
Substitutes:
GK	30	(Germany) Alexander Brunst
DF	2	(Germany) Dennis Diekmeier	(yellow card) 83'	(substituted on) 56'
DF	3	(Brazil) Cléber
MF	17	(Hungary) Zoltán Stieber		(substituted on) 69'
MF	23	(Netherlands) Rafael van der Vaart
MF	27	(Germany) Nicolai Müller
FW	9	(Germany) Maximilian Beister		(substituted on) 89'
Manager:
(Germany) Bruno Labbadia

GK	1	(Germany) Dirk Orlishausen (c)
RB	22	(Germany) Enrico Valentini	(yellow card) 13'
CB	3	(Jamaica) Daniel Gordon
CB	14	(Germany) Manuel Gulde
LB	31	(Germany) Philipp Max
CM	13	(Germany) Dominic Peitz	(yellow card) 78'
CM	23	(Germany) Jonas Meffert
RW	18	(Spain) Manuel Torres Jiménez
AM	8	(Germany) Reinhold Yabo		(substituted off) 76'
LW	11	(Azerbaijan) Dimitrij Nazarov
CF	17	(Germany) Rouwen Hennings		(substituted off) 90+3'
Substitutes:
GK	24	(Germany) René Vollath
DF	4	(Germany) Martin Stoll
DF	5	(Germany) Dennis Kempe
DF	20	(Austria) Ylli Sallahi
MF	15	(Germany) Boubacar Barry
MF	21	(France) Gaëtan Krebs		(substituted on) 76'
FW	19	(Bulgaria) Iliyan Mitsanski		(substituted on) 90+3'
Manager:
(Germany) Markus Kauczinski

Assistant referees:
Benjamin Brand
Markus Hacker
Fourth official:
Michael Weiner

Match rules

- 90 minutes.
- Seven named substitutes.
- Maximum of three substitutions.

=== Second leg ===
1 June 2015
19:00 CEST

Karlsruher SC	1–2 (a.e.t.)	Hamburger SV
Yabo 78'	Report	Díaz 90+1'; Müller 115'

Wildparkstadion, Karlsruhe
Attendance: 27,986
Referee: Manuel Gräfe

Karlsruher SC	Hamburger SV

GK	1	(Germany) Dirk Orlishausen (c)
RB	22	(Germany) Enrico Valentini
CB	3	(Jamaica) Daniel Gordon		(yellow card) 118'
CB	14	(Germany) Manuel Gulde	(yellow card) 90+2'
LB	31	(Germany) Philipp Max		(substituted off) 86'
CM	21	(France) Gaëtan Krebs	(yellow card) 87'	(substituted off) 89'
CM	23	(Germany) Jonas Meffert	(yellow card) 90'
RW	18	(Spain) Manuel Torres Jiménez
AM	9	(Japan) Hiroki Yamada		(substituted off) 72'
LW	11	(Azerbaijan) Dimitrij Nazarov	(yellow card) 120+1'
CF	17	(Germany) Rouwen Hennings
Substitutes:
GK	24	(Germany) René Vollath
DF	4	(Germany) Martin Stoll		(substituted on) 89'
DF	5	(Germany) Dennis Kempe		(substituted on) 86'
DF	20	(Austria) Ylli Sallahi
MF	8	(Germany) Reinhold Yabo		(substituted on) 72'
MF	15	(Germany) Boubacar Barry
FW	19	(Bulgaria) Iliyan Mitsanski
Manager:
(Germany) Markus Kauczinski

GK	15	(Germany) René Adler
RB	2	(Germany) Dennis Diekmeier
CB	5	(Switzerland) Johan Djourou
CB	32	(Serbia) Slobodan Rajković	(yellow card) 63'
LB	22	(Germany) Matthias Ostrzolek
CM	20	(Chile) Marcelo Díaz	(yellow card) 55'
CM	23	(Netherlands) Rafael van der Vaart (c)	(yellow card) 48'
RW	8	(Croatia) Ivica Olić		(substituted off) 77'
AM	18	(Germany) Lewis Holtby		(substituted off) 66'
LW	11	(Croatia) Ivo Iličević		(substituted off) 86'
CF	10	(Germany) Pierre-Michel Lasogga
Substitutes:
GK	30	(Germany) Alexander Brunst
DF	3	(Brazil) Cléber	(yellow card) 101'	(substituted on) 86'
DF	31	(Mozambique) Ronny Marcos
MF	17	(Hungary) Zoltán Stieber		(substituted on) 66'
MF	19	(Czech Republic) Petr Jiráček	(yellow card) 115'
MF	27	(Germany) Nicolai Müller		(substituted on) 77'
FW	9	(Germany) Maximilian Beister	(yellow card) 90+2'
Manager:
(Germany) Bruno Labbadia

Assistant referees:
Guido Kleve
René Rohde
Fourth official:
Marco Fritz

Match rules

- 90 minutes of regular time.
- 30 minutes of extra time if tied on aggregate.
- Penalty shoot-out if no further goals are scored.
- Seven named substitutes.
- Maximum of three substitutions.

Hamburger SV won 3–2 on aggregate.

== Season statistics ==
=== Top goalscorers ===
Rank	Player	Club	Goals
1	(Germany) Alexander Meier	Eintracht Frankfurt	19
2	(Poland) Robert Lewandowski	Bayern Munich	17
2	(Netherlands) Arjen Robben	Bayern Munich	17
4	(Gabon) Pierre-Emerick Aubameyang	Borussia Dortmund	16
4	(Netherlands) Bas Dost	VfL Wolfsburg	16
6	(Argentina) Franco Di Santo	Werder Bremen	13
6	(Germany) Thomas Müller	Bayern Munich	13
8	(Japan) Shinji Okazaki	Mainz 05	12
8	(Brazil) Raffael	Borussia Mönchengladbach	12
10	(Germany) Karim Bellarabi	Bayer Leverkusen	11
10	(Germany) Patrick Herrmann	Borussia Mönchengladbach	11
10	(Germany) Max Kruse	Borussia Mönchengladbach	11
10	(South Korea) Son Heung-min	Bayer Leverkusen	11

=== Hat-tricks ===
Player	Club	Against	Result	Date
(Germany) Thomas Müller	Bayern Munich	Eintracht Frankfurt	4–0	8 November 2014
(Netherlands) Klaas-Jan Huntelaar	Schalke 04	1. FSV Mainz 05	4–1	29 November 2014
(Cameroon) Eric Maxim Choupo-Moting	Schalke 04	VfB Stuttgart	4–0	6 December 2014
(Germany) Nils Petersen	SC Freiburg	Eintracht Frankfurt	4–1	31 January 2015
(Netherlands) Bas Dost^{4}	VfL Wolfsburg	Bayer Leverkusen	5–4	14 February 2015
(South Korea) Son Heung-min	Bayer Leverkusen	VfL Wolfsburg	4–5	14 February 2015

^{4} Player scored four goals

== Awards ==
Award	Winner	Club
German Footballer of the Year	(Belgium) Kevin De Bruyne	VfL Wolfsburg
VDV Player of the Season	(Belgium) Kevin De Bruyne	VfL Wolfsburg
VDV Newcomer of the Season	(Germany) Leroy Sané	Schalke 04
VDV Coach of the Season	(Switzerland) Lucien Favre	Borussia Mönchengladbach
Top scorer	(Germany) Alexander Meier	Eintracht Frankfurt

Team of the Year
Goalkeeper	(Germany) Manuel Neuer (Bayern Munich)			
Defenders	(Switzerland) Ricardo Rodríguez (Wolfsburg)	(Brazil) Naldo (Wolfsburg)	(Germany) Jérôme Boateng (Bayern Munich)	(Portugal) Vieirinha (Wolfsburg)
Midfielders	(Austria) David Alaba (Bayern Munich)	(Belgium) Kevin De Bruyne (Wolfsburg)	(Spain) Xabi Alonso (Bayern Munich)	
Forwards	(Netherlands) Arjen Robben (Bayern Munich)	(Poland) Robert Lewandowski (Bayern Munich)	(Germany) Thomas Müller (Bayern Munich)	

== Attendances ==
No.	Team	Matches	Total	Average
1	Borussia Dortmund	17	1,367,871	80,463
2	Bayern München	17	1,239,000	72,882
3	Schalke 04	17	1,046,822	61,578
4	Hamburger SV	17	905,278	53,252
5	VfB Stuttgart	17	862,100	50,712
6	Borussia Mönchengladbach	17	861,218	50,660
7	Hertha BSC	17	853,140	50,185
8	1. FC Köln	17	821,600	48,329
9	Eintracht Frankfurt	17	809,500	47,618
10	Hannover 96	17	738,800	43,459
11	Werder Bremen	17	695,396	40,906
12	Mainz 05	17	527,139	31,008
13	Bayer Leverkusen	17	498,293	29,311
14	FC Augsburg	17	495,779	29,163
15	VfL Wolfsburg	17	479,387	28,199
16	1899 Hoffenheim	17	462,117	27,183
17	SC Freiburg	17	405,450	23,850
18	SC Paderborn 07	17	252,596	14,859
