= 2012–13 3. Liga =

5th season of the 3. Liga

3. Liga
- Season: 2012–13
- Champions: Karlsruher SC
- Promoted: Karlsruher SC; Arminia Bielefeld
- Relegated: Kickers Offenbach; SV Babelsberg 03; Alemannia Aachen
- Matches: 380
- Goals: 953 (2.51 per match)
- Top goalscorer: Anton Fink; Fabian Klos (20 goals)
- Biggest home win: Rot-Weiß Erfurt 5–0 Borussia Dortmund II (1 September 2012); 1. FC Saarbrücken 5–0 Hallescher FC (24 November 2012); Chemnitzer FC 5–0 SpVgg Unterhaching (18 May 2013)
- Biggest away win: Rot-Weiß Erfurt 0–4 1. FC Heidenheim (28 July 2012); Alemannia Aachen 0–4 Karlsruher SC (9 February 2013); SV Babelsberg 03 0–4 SV Wacker Burghausen (11 May 2013)
- Highest scoring: SC Preußen Münster 5–2 F.C. Hansa Rostock (9 August 2012); SpVgg Unterhaching 4–3 Borussia Dortmund II (22 September 2012); Kickers Offenbach 5–2 SV Babelsberg 03 (6 October 2012); SpVgg Unterhaching 4–3 Chemnitzer FC (24 November 2012); Karlsruher SC 5–2 1. FC Heidenheim (1 December 2012); Alemannia Aachen 3–4 Hansa Rostock (12 April 2013); Borussia Dortmund II 4–3 Rot-Weiß Erfurt (7 May 2013)
- Longest winning run: 10 games Karlsruher SC
- Longest unbeaten run: 19 games Karlsruher SC
- Longest winless run: 14 games SV Wehen Wiesbaden
- Longest losing run: 6 games F.C. Hansa Rostock

The 2012–13 3. Liga was the fifth season of the 3. Liga, Germany's third-level football league. The season began on the weekend of 21 July 2012 and ended with the last games on 18 May 2013, with a winter break held between the weekends around 15 December 2012 and 26 January 2013.

The league consisted of twenty teams: The teams placed fourth through seventeenth of the 2011–12 season, the worst two teams from the 2011–12 2nd Bundesliga, the three division champions of the 2011–12 Fußball-Regionalliga and the losers of the relegation play-off between the 16th-placed 2nd Bundesliga team and the third-placed 3rd Liga team.

== Teams ==
At the end of the 2011–12 season, SV Sandhausen and VfR Aalen were directly promoted to the 2012–13 2nd Bundesliga. Sandhausen, having been a charter member of the 3rd Liga for its first four seasons, left the third level after five seasons overall, while Aalen celebrated their second consecutive promotion within twelve months. The two promoted teams were replaced by Alemannia Aachen and Hansa Rostock, who finished in the bottom two places of the 2011–12 2nd Bundesliga table and thus were directly relegated. Aachen gave their debut in the 3rd Liga, returning to the third level after thirteen seasons, while Rostock returned to the league after only one year in the second tier.

On the other end of the table, Rot-Weiß Oberhausen, FC Carl Zeiss Jena and SV Werder Bremen II were relegated to the 2012–13 Fußball-Regionalliga; Oberhausen entered the newly formed Regionalliga West, with Jena going to the Regionalliga Nordost and Werder Bremen reserves being admitted to the Regionalliga Nord. The three relegated teams will be replaced by the champions of the three 2011–12 Regionalliga divisions. Borussia Dortmund II from the Western division and Stuttgarter Kickers from the Southern Division returned after absences of two and three years respectively, while Hallescher FC from the Northern division will return to a national level of football for the first time since the 1991–92 2nd Bundesliga season and to third level after 18 years.

A further place in the league was available via a two-legged play-off between third-placed 2011–12 3rd Liga team Jahn Regensburg and 16th-placed 2011–12 2. Bundesliga sides Karlsruher SC. The tie ended 3–3 on aggregate and saw Jahn promoted via the away goal rule. Being a charter member of the 3rd Liga, Regensburg returned to the second level after eight years in the third tier of the German football league system; in turn, Karlsruhe gave their debut in the 3rd Liga after finishing a three-year 2nd Bundesliga spell, returning to the third level for the first time since the 2000–01 season in the process.

=== Stadiums and locations ===
One ground change occurred for the 2012–13 season, as Kickers Offenbach completed the re-building of their new ground, Sparda-Bank Hessen Stadium, at the same spot of their former home, Stadion am Bieberer Berg.

Location of teams in the 2012–13 3. Liga

| Team | Location | Stadium | Stadium capacity |
|---|---|---|---|
| Alemannia Aachen | Aachen | New Tivoli | 32,960 |
| Arminia Bielefeld | Bielefeld | Schüco-Arena | 27,300 |
| SV Babelsberg 03 | Potsdam | Karl-Liebknecht-Stadion | 10,786 |
| Borussia Dortmund II | Dortmund | Stadion Rote Erde | 10,000 |
| Chemnitzer FC | Chemnitz | Stadion an der Gellertstraße | 18,712 |
| SV Darmstadt 98 | Darmstadt | Stadion am Böllenfalltor | 19,000 |
| Hallescher FC | Halle | Erdgas Sportpark | 15,057 |
| Hansa Rostock | Rostock | DKB-Arena | 29,000 |
| 1. FC Heidenheim 1846 | Heidenheim | Voith-Arena | 10,001 |
| Karlsruher SC | Karlsruhe | Wildparkstadion | 29,699 |
| Kickers Offenbach | Offenbach | Sparda Bank Hessen Stadium | 20,500 |
| VfL Osnabrück | Osnabrück | Osnatel-Arena | 16,667 |
| Preußen Münster | Münster | Preußenstadion | 15,050 |
| Rot-Weiß Erfurt | Erfurt | Steigerwaldstadion | 17,500 |
| 1. FC Saarbrücken | Saarbrücken | Ludwigspark | 35,303 |
| VfB Stuttgart II | Stuttgart | Gazi-Stadion auf der Waldau | 10,100 |
| Stuttgarter Kickers | Stuttgart | Gazi-Stadion auf der Waldau | 10,100 |
| SpVgg Unterhaching | Unterhaching | Stadion am Sportpark | 15,053 |
| SV Wacker Burghausen | Burghausen | Wacker-Arena | 10,000 |
| SV Wehen Wiesbaden | Wiesbaden | BRITA-Arena | 12,250 |

=== Personnel and sponsorships ===
| Team | Head coach | Team captain | Kitmaker | Shirt sponsor |
|---|---|---|---|---|
| Alemannia Aachen | (Netherlands) René van Eck | (Germany) Albert Streit (to January) | Nike | Galler |
| Arminia Bielefeld | (Germany) Stefan Krämer | (Germany) Thomas Hübener | Saller | Vacant |
| SV Babelsberg 03 | (Germany) Dieter Timme | (Germany) Daniel Reiche | Umbro | EWP (Energie und Wasser Potsdam) |
| Borussia Dortmund II | (United States) David Wagner | (Germany) Florian Hübner | Puma | Evonik |
| Chemnitzer FC | (Germany) Gerd Schädlich | (Germany) Carsten Sträßer | Saller | aetka Communication Center |
| SV Darmstadt 98 | (Germany) Dirk Schuster | (Germany) Jan Zimmermann | Nike | Software AG |
| Hallescher FC | (Germany) Sven Köhler | (Germany) Maik Wagefeld | Reebok | Helplus |
| Hansa Rostock | (Germany) Marc Fascher | (Germany) Sebastian Pelzer | Nike | Veolia |
| 1. FC Heidenheim | (Germany) Frank Schmidt | (Germany) Marc Schnatterer | Nike | Hartmann Gruppe |
| Karlsruher SC | (Germany) Markus Kauczinski | (Germany) Dirk Orlishausen | Hummel | Klaiber Markisen |
| Kickers Offenbach | (Germany) Rico Schmitt | (Bosnia and Herzegovina) Sead Mehić | Nike | EVO (Energieversorgung Offenbach) |
| VfL Osnabrück | (Germany) Claus-Dieter Wollitz | (Germany) Claus Costa | Puma | Sparkasse Osnabrück |
| Preußen Münster | (Bulgaria) Pavel Dochev | (Germany) Stefan Kühne | Nike | Tuja Zeitarbeit |
| Rot-Weiß Erfurt | (Germany) Alois Schwartz | (Germany) Nils Pfingsten-Reddig | Jako | E.ON Thüringen |
| 1. FC Saarbrücken | (Germany) Jürgen Luginger | (Germany) Marc Lerandy | Nike | Victor's Residenz-Hotels |
| VfB Stuttgart II | (Germany) Jürgen Kramny | (Germany) Tobias Rathgeb | Puma | GAZI |
| Stuttgarter Kickers | (Italy) Massimo Morales | (Italy) Vincenzo Marchese | Umbro | Subaru |
| SpVgg Unterhaching | (Germany) Claus Schromm | (Germany) Stefan Riederer | Adidas | Vacant |
| Wacker Burghausen | (Bulgaria) Georgi Donkov | (Germany) Alexander Eberlein | Hummel | OMV |
| SV Wehen Wiesbaden | (Germany) Peter Vollmann | (Germany) Nils-Ole Book | Nike | no shirt sponsor |

=== Managerial changes ===
| Team | Outgoing manager | Manner of departure | Date of vacancy | Position in table | Replaced by | Date of appointment |
|---|---|---|---|---|---|---|
| SV Babelsberg 03 | (Germany) Dietmar Demuth | Sacked | 15 May 2012 | Off-season | (Germany) Christian Benbennek | 15 May 2012 |
| SpVgg Unterhaching | (Germany) Heiko Herrlich | Resigned | 25 May 2012 | Off-season | (Germany) Claus Schromm | 28 June 2012 |
| Wacker Burghausen | (Germany) Reinhard Stumpf | End of contract | 30 June 2012 | Off-season | (Bulgaria) Georgi Donkov | 1 July 2012 |
| Rot-Weiß Erfurt | (Germany) Stefan Emmerling | Sacked | 25 August 2012 | 20th | (Germany) Alois Schwartz | 10 September 2012 |
| SV Darmstadt 98 | (Germany) Kosta Runjaić | Signed by MSV Duisburg | 2 September 2012 | 18th | (Germany) Jürgen Seeberger | 5 September 2012 |
| Hansa Rostock | (Germany) Wolfgang Wolf | Sacked | 3 September 2012 | 14th | (Germany) Marc Fascher | 5 September 2012 |
| Alemannia Aachen | (Germany) Ralf Außem | Sacked | 3 September 2012 | 13th | (Netherlands) René van Eck | 10 September 2012 |
| Stuttgarter Kickers | (Germany) Dirk Schuster | Sacked | 19 November 2012 | 18th | (Germany) Guido Buchwald (interim) | 20 December 2012 |
| SV Darmstadt 98 | (Germany) Jürgen Seeberger | Sacked | 17 December 2012 | 20th | (Germany) Dirk Schuster | 28 December 2012 |
| Stuttgarter Kickers | (Germany) Guido Buchwald | Appointment of permanent manager | 20 December 2012 | 18th | (Germany) Gerd Dais | 20 December 2012 |
| Kickers Offenbach | (Germany) Arie van Lent | Sacked | 6 February 2013 | 12th | (Germany) Rico Schmitt | 13 February 2013 |
| Stuttgarter Kickers | (Germany) Gerd Dais | Sacked | 7 April 2013 | 17th | (Italy) Massimo Morales | 7 April 2013 |
| SV Babelsberg 03 | (Germany) Christian Benbennek | Sacked | 9 April 2013 | 18th | (Bosnia and Herzegovina) Almedin Civa (interim) | 19 April 2013 |
| SV Babelsberg 03 | (Bosnia and Herzegovina) Almedin Civa | Appointment of permanent manager | 29 April 2013 | 18th | (Germany) Dieter Timme | 29 April 2013 |
| VfL Osnabrück | (Germany) Claus-Dieter Wollitz | Sacked | 17 May 2013 | 4th | (Germany) Alexander Ukrow (interim) | 17 May 2013 |

== League table ==
| Pos | Team | Pld | W | D | L | GF | GA | GD | Pts | Promotion, qualification or relegation |
|---|---|---|---|---|---|---|---|---|---|---|
| 1 | Karlsruher SC (C, P) | 38 | 23 | 10 | 5 | 69 | 27 | +42 | 79 | Promotion to 2. Bundesliga and qualification for DFB-Pokal |
| 2 | Arminia Bielefeld (P) | 38 | 22 | 10 | 6 | 59 | 32 | +27 | 76 | Promotion to 2. Bundesliga and qualification for DFB-Pokal |
| 3 | VfL Osnabrück | 38 | 22 | 7 | 9 | 64 | 35 | +29 | 73 | Qualification to promotion play-offs and DFB-Pokal |
| 4 | Preußen Münster | 38 | 20 | 12 | 6 | 63 | 33 | +30 | 72 | Qualification for DFB-Pokal |
| 5 | 1. FC Heidenheim | 38 | 21 | 9 | 8 | 69 | 47 | +22 | 72 | |
| 6 | Chemnitzer FC | 38 | 15 | 10 | 13 | 56 | 47 | +9 | 55 | |
| 7 | SV Wehen Wiesbaden | 38 | 11 | 18 | 9 | 51 | 51 | 0 | 51 | |
| 8 | Wacker Burghausen | 38 | 14 | 9 | 15 | 45 | 45 | 0 | 51 | |
| 9 | SpVgg Unterhaching | 38 | 14 | 9 | 15 | 48 | 55 | −7 | 51 | |
| 10 | Hallescher FC | 38 | 12 | 10 | 16 | 37 | 50 | −13 | 46 | |
| 11 | 1. FC Saarbrücken | 38 | 12 | 9 | 17 | 52 | 62 | −10 | 45 | |
| 12 | Hansa Rostock | 38 | 11 | 11 | 16 | 39 | 52 | −13 | 44 | |
| 13 | Rot-Weiß Erfurt | 38 | 11 | 11 | 16 | 44 | 58 | −14 | 44 | |
| 14 | VfB Stuttgart II (Note: Reserve teams are ineligible for promotion or DFB-Pokal qualification.) | 38 | 11 | 10 | 17 | 35 | 42 | −7 | 43 | |
| 15 | Kickers Offenbach (Note: Offenbach has two points deducted for using bond money from a DFB fund. After the end of the season, Offenbach were not granted a license for the following season and are thus relegated.) (R) | 38 | 11 | 11 | 16 | 41 | 44 | −3 | 42 | Relegation to Regionalliga |
| 16 | Borussia Dortmund II | 38 | 9 | 14 | 15 | 39 | 58 | −19 | 41 | |
| 17 | Stuttgarter Kickers | 38 | 10 | 10 | 18 | 39 | 48 | −9 | 40 | |
| 18 | SV Darmstadt 98 | 38 | 8 | 14 | 16 | 32 | 46 | −14 | 38 | |
| 19 | SV Babelsberg 03 (R) | 38 | 9 | 10 | 19 | 32 | 54 | −22 | 37 | Relegation to Regionalliga |
| 20 | Alemannia Aachen (Note: Alemannia Aachen took voluntary relegation on 23 November 2012, due to financial insolvency. Later has five points deducted for using bond money from a DFB fund and not paying back in time.) (R) | 38 | 7 | 10 | 21 | 40 | 68 | −28 | 26 | Relegation to Regionalliga |

Source: kicker
Rules for classification: 1) points; 2) goal difference; 3) number of goals scored.
(C) Champions; (P) Promoted; (R) Relegated

== Results ==
| Home \ Away | AAC | SVB | DSC | WBU | CFC | D98 | DO2 | ERF | HFC | FCH | KSC | PRM | KOF | OSN | ROS | FCS | SKI | ST2 | UNT | WEH |
|---|---|---|---|---|---|---|---|---|---|---|---|---|---|---|---|---|---|---|---|---|
| Alemannia Aachen | — | 1–2 | 2–1 | 3–2 | 1–5 | 1–1 | 1–1 | 1–1 | 0–3 | 1–2 | 0–4 | 1–2 | 1–3 | 0–1 | 3–4 | 2–0 | 3–0 | 4–2 | 1–3 | 1–1 |
| SV Babelsberg | 1–0 | — | 0–2 | 0–4 | 1–1 | 2–0 | 1–1 | 1–1 | 0–1 | 2–4 | 0–0 | 1–0 | 0–0 | 1–0 | 2–1 | 0–1 | 1–0 | 0–0 | 3–1 | 2–2 |
| Arminia Bielefeld | 1–1 | 3–0 | — | 3–0 | 0–0 | 0–0 | 4–2 | 2–0 | 2–1 | 1–0 | 1–0 | 1–1 | 3–1 | 1–0 | 0–1 | 3–2 | 1–0 | 1–1 | 3–0 | 3–1 |
| Wacker Burghausen | 2–0 | 3–1 | 1–0 | — | 2–1 | 1–0 | 2–2 | 0–0 | 2–0 | 4–1 | 1–2 | 0–2 | 0–0 | 1–1 | 2–0 | 2–1 | 1–4 | 1–3 | 3–1 | 0–0 |
| Chemnitzer FC | 1–2 | 1–0 | 0–1 | 2–1 | — | 3–1 | 1–0 | 1–2 | 1–1 | 2–1 | 1–2 | 2–2 | 2–0 | 0–2 | 2–1 | 4–1 | 2–0 | 1–0 | 5–0 | 3–2 |
| Darmstadt 98 | 0–0 | 0–0 | 1–3 | 0–0 | 1–1 | — | 1–2 | 0–1 | 1–2 | 0–2 | 0–1 | 2–1 | 1–0 | 1–0 | 1–1 | 1–2 | 1–1 | 3–1 | 0–0 | 1–0 |
| Borussia Dortmund II | 0–0 | 0–0 | 1–1 | 2–1 | 1–2 | 1–0 | — | 4–3 | 2–2 | 2–1 | 0–3 | 0–0 | 0–0 | 1–1 | 0–0 | 1–2 | 1–1 | 0–2 | 2–1 | 1–2 |
| Rot-Weiß Erfurt | 3–1 | 1–1 | 0–2 | 0–3 | 3–2 | 2–4 | 5–0 | — | 2–1 | 0–4 | 0–1 | 1–1 | 1–1 | 2–1 | 1–1 | 1–2 | 0–3 | 1–1 | 1–0 | 2–2 |
| Hallescher FC | 1–0 | 1–0 | 2–2 | 0–0 | 2–0 | 2–2 | 0–1 | 3–0 | — | 0–0 | 0–2 | 0–2 | 1–0 | 1–2 | 3–1 | 2–1 | 1–1 | 1–4 | 0–1 | 1–1 |
| 1. FC Heidenheim | 1–1 | 2–1 | 3–0 | 2–1 | 3–2 | 3–0 | 2–2 | 2–1 | 3–1 | — | 2–2 | 3–1 | 0–0 | 1–3 | 1–2 | 3–0 | 2–1 | 1–0 | 2–1 | 2–2 |
| Karlsruher SC | 0–0 | 2–1 | 0–0 | 1–2 | 4–1 | 2–0 | 1–0 | 3–0 | 0–0 | 5–2 | — | 2–1 | 2–1 | 1–1 | 1–1 | 3–0 | 3–0 | 3–1 | 0–0 | 4–0 |
| Preußen Münster | 4–1 | 4–1 | 4–0 | 2–0 | 1–0 | 3–0 | 1–0 | 3–2 | 2–0 | 1–1 | 2–1 | — | 2–2 | 3–1 | 5–2 | 3–3 | 0–1 | 0–0 | 0–0 | 0–0 |
| Kickers Offenbach | 1–1 | 5–2 | 1–3 | 1–0 | 0–0 | 0–2 | 3–0 | 0–1 | 0–1 | 0–1 | 1–1 | 0–1 | — | 1–5 | 2–1 | 2–0 | 3–0 | 1–3 | 1–0 | 1–0 |
| VfL Osnabrück | 4–0 | 1–0 | 0–0 | 1–0 | 2–2 | 1–0 | 2–0 | 1–0 | 2–0 | 2–2 | 2–3 | 0–2 | 2–0 | — | 3–2 | 3–0 | 3–1 | 2–0 | 3–0 | 2–2 |
| Hansa Rostock | 1–0 | 4–1 | 0–2 | 1–0 | 0–0 | 0–0 | 2–0 | 0–0 | 2–0 | 0–2 | 0–3 | 0–2 | 2–2 | 0–3 | — | 2–0 | 2–1 | 0–0 | 0–1 | 1–1 |
| 1. FC Saarbrücken | 1–2 | 2–1 | 2–4 | 3–0 | 2–0 | 3–1 | 3–3 | 0–2 | 5–0 | 1–2 | 0–0 | 0–0 | 2–2 | 0–1 | 1–1 | — | 3–0 | 0–0 | 2–4 | 3–3 |
| Stuttgarter Kickers | 3–1 | 2–1 | 1–1 | 1–2 | 1–1 | 1–1 | 0–1 | 0–1 | 0–0 | 0–2 | 0–2 | 0–2 | 0–2 | 3–0 | 2–0 | 1–2 | — | 3–0 | 0–0 | 0–0 |
| VfB Stuttgart II | 2–1 | 2–1 | 0–1 | 0–0 | 0–1 | 0–2 | 0–1 | 1–0 | 3–0 | 0–2 | 2–0 | 0–1 | 1–0 | 1–2 | 0–2 | 0–1 | 1–4 | — | 0–0 | 1–1 |
| SpVgg Unterhaching | 1–0 | 0–1 | 3–2 | 3–0 | 4–3 | 2–2 | 4–3 | 2–2 | 1–3 | 4–1 | 2–1 | 3–0 | 0–3 | 0–2 | 3–0 | 0–0 | 1–1 | 0–3 | — | 0–2 |
| Wehen Wiesbaden | 3–2 | 1–0 | 0–1 | 1–1 | 0–0 | 1–1 | 3–1 | 3–1 | 2–0 | 1–1 | 2–4 | 2–2 | 2–1 | 3–2 | 2–1 | 3–1 | 0–2 | 0–0 | 0–2 | — |

Source: DFB
Legend: Blue = home team win; Yellow = draw; Red = away team win.

== Season statistics ==
=== Top goalscorers ===
Source: kicker (German)

| Rank | Player | Club | Goals |
|---|---|---|---|
| 1 | (Germany) Anton Fink | Chemnitzer FC | 20 |
| 1 | (Germany) Fabian Klos | Arminia Bielefeld | 20 |
| 3 | (Germany) Marco Grüttner | Stuttgarter Kickers | 18 |
| 4 | (Turkey) Hakan Çalhanoğlu | Karlsruher SC | 17 |
| 5 | (Germany) Marc Schnatterer | 1. FC Heidenheim | 16 |
| 5 | (United States) Matthew Taylor | SC Preußen Münster | 16 |
| 5 | (Germany) Marcel Ziemer | 1. FC Saarbrücken | 16 |
| 8 | (Bosnia and Herzegovina) Zlatko Janjić | SV Wehen Wiesbaden | 15 |
| 8 | (Netherlands) Koen van der Biezen | Karlsruher SC | 15 |
| 8 | (Germany) Simon Zoller | VfL Osnabrück | 15 |

== Player awards ==
The following players were named as player of the month throughout the season.

- August: (Turkey) Hakan Çalhanoğlu (Karlsruher SC)
- September: (Czech Republic) Ondrej Smetana (Hansa Rostock)
- October: (Czech Republic) Ondrej Smetana (Hansa Rostock)
- November: (Germany) Rouwen Hennings (Karlsruher SC)
- February: (Germany) Dirk Orlishausen (Karlsruher SC)
- March: (Germany) Dirk Orlishausen (Karlsruher SC)
- April: (Netherlands) Koen van der Biezen (Karlsruher SC)

Hakan Çalhanoğlu was voted as player of the season.

== Team of the Year ==
The following players were named as the team of the year.

- GK: (Germany) Patrick Platins (Arminia Bielefeld)
- RB: (Germany) Philipp Klingmann (Karlsruher SC)
- CB: (Germany) Jan Mauersberger (Karlsruher SC)
- LB: (Germany) Stephan Salger (Arminia Bielefeld)
- CB: (Germany) Manuel Hornig (Arminia Bielefeld)
- RM: (Germany) Sebastian Hille (Arminia Bielefeld)
- CM: (Germany) Dominic Peitz (Karlsruher SC)
- CM: (Germany) Tom Schütz (Arminia Bielefeld)
- LM: (Turkey) Hakan Çalhanoğlu (Karlsruher SC)
- CF: (Germany) Fabian Klos (Arminia Bielefeld)
- CF: (Netherlands) Koen van der Biezen (Karlsruher SC)
- Coach: (Germany) Stefan Krämer (Arminia Bielefeld)
