= Marco Caligiuri =

German footballer

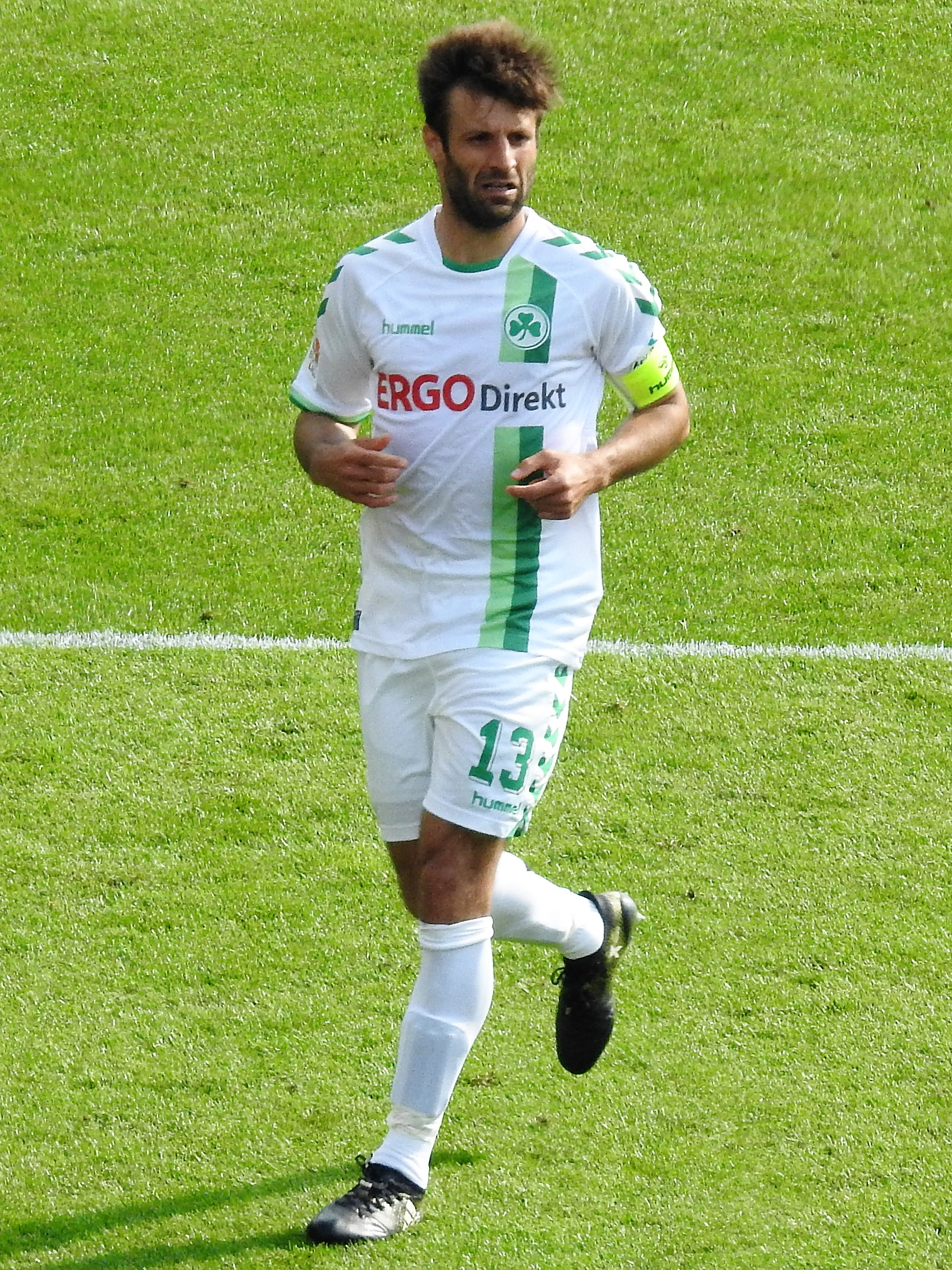
- Caligiuri with Greuther Fürth in 2017

Personal information
- Date of birth: 14 April 1984 (age 42)
- Place of birth: Villingen-Schwenningen, West Germany
- Height: 1.80 m (5 ft 11 in)
- Position: Midfielder

Youth career
- 1998–2000: BSV 07 Schwenningen
- 2000–2003: VfB Stuttgart

Senior career*
Years	Team	Apps	(Gls)
2003–2005	VfB Stuttgart II	63	(5)
2005–2007	VfB Stuttgart	0	(0)
2006–2007	→ MSV Duisburg (loan)	31	(4)
2014	→ MSV Duisburg II (loan)	4	(0)
2007–2010	Greuther Fürth	37	(0)
2014	→ Greuther Fürth II	2	(0)
2010–2013	Mainz 05	74	(4)
2014	→ Mainz 05 II	1	(0)
2013–2014	Eintracht Braunschweig	12	(0)
2014	→ Eintracht Braunschweig II	3	(0)
2014–2020	Greuther Fürth II	2	(0)
2014–2020	Greuther Fürth	175	(8)
Total		404	(21)

International career
2004–2005	Germany U-20	11	(3)
- * Club domestic league appearances and goals

Marco Caligiuri (born 14 April 1984) is a German former professional footballer who played as a midfielder for Greuther Fürth for most of his career.

== Career ==
Born in Villingen-Schwenningen, Caligiuri made his debut on the professional league level in the Bundesliga for MSV Duisburg on 18 January 2006 when he started in a game against VfB Stuttgart, scoring on his debut. On 16 March 2010, he announced his intention to leave Greuther Fürth.

On 30 March 2010, Caligiuri signed a contract with 1. FSV Mainz 05. He joined his new club on 1 July 2010. After three years in Mainz, it was announced on 15 May 2013 that Caligiuri would move to Eintracht Braunschweig. He left Braunschweig after the 2013–14 Bundesliga season.

On 22 August 2014, Caligiuri re-joined his former club Greuther Fürth. In May 2020, Greuther Fürth announced Caligiuri's contract would not be renewed. In June he retired from playing.

== Personal life ==
He is the brother of FC Augsburg player Daniel Caligiuri and was born to a German mother and an Italian father.

== Career statistics ==
Appearances and goals by club, season and competition
Club	Season	League			Cup		Continental		Total	
Club	Season	League	Apps	Goals	Apps	Goals	Apps	Goals	Apps	Goals
VfB Stuttgart II	2003–04	Regionalliga Süd	17	0	—		—		17	0
VfB Stuttgart II	2004–05	Regionalliga Süd	27	2	—		—		27	2
VfB Stuttgart II	2005–06	Regionalliga Süd	19	3	—		—		19	3
VfB Stuttgart II	Total		63	5	—		—		63	5
MSV Duisburg	2005–06	Bundesliga	14	2	0	0	—		14	2
MSV Duisburg	2006–07	2. Bundesliga	17	1	2	0	—		19	1
MSV Duisburg	Total		31	3	2	0	—		33	3
MSV Duisburg II	2006–07	Oberliga Nordrhein	4	0	—		—		4	0
Greuther Fürth	2007–08	2. Bundesliga	7	0	1	0	—		8	0
Greuther Fürth	2008–09	2. Bundesliga	1	0	0	0	—		1	0
Greuther Fürth	2009–10	2. Bundesliga	29	0	3	0	—		32	0
Greuther Fürth	Total		37	0	4	0	—		41	0
Greuther Fürth II	2008–09	Regionalliga Süd	2	0	—		—		2	0
Mainz 05 II	2010–11	Regionalliga West	1	0	—		—		1	0
Mainz 05	2010–11	Bundesliga	22	1	0	0	—		22	1
Mainz 05	2011–12	Bundesliga	30	2	1	0	1	0	32	2
Mainz 05	2012–13	Bundesliga	22	1	4	1	—		26	2
Mainz 05	Total		74	4	5	1	1	0	80	5
Eintracht Braunschweig	2013–14	Bundesliga	12	0	1	0	—		13	0
Eintracht Braunschweig II	2013–14	Regionalliga Nord	3	0	—		—		3	0
Greuther Fürth II	2014–15	Regionalliga Bayern	2	0	—		—		2	0
Greuther Fürth	2014–15	2. Bundesliga	27	0	1	0	—		28	0
Greuther Fürth	2015–16	2. Bundesliga	33	0	0	0	—		33	0
Greuther Fürth	2016–17	2. Bundesliga	29	0	3	0	—		32	0
Greuther Fürth	2017–18	2. Bundesliga	32	4	1	0	—		33	4
Greuther Fürth	2018–19	2. Bundesliga	25	3	0	0	—		25	3
Greuther Fürth	2019–20	2. Bundesliga	29	1	1	0	—		30	1
Greuther Fürth	Total		175	8	6	0	—		181	8
Career total			404	20	18	1	1	0	423	21
