= 2017–18 SpVgg Greuther Fürth season =

SpVgg Greuther Fürth
2017–18 season
- President: Helmut Hack
- Stadium: Sportpark Ronhof Thomas Sommer
- 2. Bundesliga: 15th
- DFB-Pokal: Round 2
Home colours	Away colours	Third colours

The 2017–18 SpVgg Gr. Fürth season is the 115th season in the football club's history and 5th consecutive season in the second division of German football, the 2. Bundesliga and 29th overall. In addition to the league business, the Kleeblätter also are participating in this season's edition of the domestic cup, the DFB-Pokal. They play in their 118th consecutive year in their stadium, Sportpark Ronhof Thomas Sommer, while ongoing redevelopment of the main stand is in progress since 2016.

== Players ==
=== Squad information ===
As of 1 September 2017

Note: Flags indicate national team as defined under FIFA eligibility rules; some limited exceptions apply. Players may hold more than one non-FIFA nationality.

No.	Pos.	Nation	Player
1	GK	(Germany) GER	Marius Funk
2	DF	(Germany) GER	Stephen Sama
3	DF	(Germany) GER	Maximilian Wittek
4	DF	(Austria) AUT	Lukas Gugganig
5	DF	(Sweden) SWE	Richard Magyar
7	MF	(Germany) GER	Levent Ayçiçek
8	FW	(United States) USA	Julian Green
9	FW	(Germany) GER	Serdar Dursun
10	MF	(Albania) ALB	Jurgen Gjasula
11	FW	(Germany) GER	Philipp Hofmann
13	DF	(Germany) GER	Marco Caligiuri
14	MF	(Ivory Coast) CIV	Mathis Bolly
15	MF	(Germany) GER	Sebastian Ernst
16	MF	(Hungary) HUN	Ádám Pintér

No.	Pos.	Nation	Player
17	MF	(Spain) ESP	Manuel Torres
18	MF	(Germany) GER	Benedikt Kirsch
21	DF	(Germany) GER	Khaled Narey
22	DF	(Croatia) CRO	Mario Maloča
23	MF	(Turkey) TUR	Sercan Sararer
24	GK	(Hungary) HUN	Balazs Megyeri
25	GK	(Germany) GER	Timo Königsmann
29	MF	(Germany) GER	Tolcay Cigerci
30	GK	(Germany) GER	Sascha Burchert
31	FW	(Germany) GER	Daniel Steininger
33	FW	(Slovenia) SVN	Nik Omladič
35	DF	(Germany) GER	Dominik Schad
39	MF	(Germany) GER	David Raum
40	MF	(Germany) GER	Patrick Sontheimer

=== Transfers ===
==== Summer ====
In:

No.	Pos.	Nation	Player
3	DF	(Germany) GER	Maximilian Wittek (from TSV 1860 Munich)
5	DF	(Sweden) SWE	Richard Magyar (from Hammarby Fotboll)
11	FW	(Germany) GER	Philipp Hofmann (from Brentford F.C.)
15	MF	(Germany) GER	Sebastian Ernst (from Würzburger Kickers)
17	MF	(Spain) ESP	Manuel Torres (from Karlsruher SC)
25	GK	(Germany) GER	Timo Königsmann (from Hannover 96)
33	MF	(Slovenia) SVN	Nik Omladič (from Eintracht Braunschweig)
22	DF	(Croatia) CRO	Mario Maloča (on loan from Lechia Gdańsk)
7	MF	(Germany) GER	Levent Ayçiçek (from Werder Bremen)
—	FW	(United States) USA	Julian Green (on loan from VfB Stuttgart)

Out:

No.	Pos.	Nation	Player
1	GK	(Germany) GER	Sebastian Mielitz (to SønderjyskE Fodbold)
5	DF	(Germany) GER	Nicolai Rapp (loan return to 1899 Hoffenheim)
7	DF	(Germany) GER	Niko Gießelmann (to Fortuna Düsseldorf)
17	MF	(Norway) NOR	Zlatko Tripić (released)
20	MF	(Austria) AUT	Robert Žulj (to 1899 Hoffenheim)
33	FW	(Kosovo) KOS	Ilir Azemi (released)
25	MF	(Sierra Leone) SLE	George Davies (to SKN St. Pölten, previously on loan to Floridsdorfer AC)
19	FW	(Norway) NOR	Veton Berisha (to Rapid Wien)

== Matches ==
=== Legend ===
Win Draw Loss

=== Friendly matches ===
24 June 2017	SpVgg Ansbach	5–2	SpVgg Fürth	Ansbach
16:00	Kroiß 6', 49', Landshuter 17', Hammeter 75', 82'	report	Hofmann 39', Serdar Dursun 51'	Stadium: Xaver-Bertsch-Sportpark; Attendance: 800; Referee: unknown

25 June 2017	SpVgg Fürth	1–2	VfR Aalen	Veitsbronn
16:00	Hofmann 12'	report	Trianni 22', Wegkamp 82'	Stadium: Sportplatz Hamesbuck; Attendance: 500; Referee: unknown

29 June 2017	SpVgg Fürth	3–0	FSV Zwickau	Fürth
18:00	Berisha 15', Narey 32', Cigerci 78'	report		Stadium: Training ground SpVgg Fürth; Attendance: 0 Referee: unknown

11 July 2017	SpVgg Fürth	5–1	Viktoria Plzen	Westendorf (Austria)
18:00	Serdar Dursun 14', 17', 50', Omladic 40', Ernst 60'	report	Kopic 58'	Stadium: Waldstadion Westendorf; Attendance: 0 Referee: unknown

14 July 2017	ASV Zirndorf	0–9	SpVgg Fürth	Zirndorf
18:30	Serdar Dursun 2', 7', 59', 72' (83), Ernst 64', 65', Sontheimer 10', Scheuchenpflug 84'	report		Stadium: Sportplatz Zirndorf; Attendance: 1000; Referee: unknown

20 July 2017	SpVgg Fürth	0–0	FSV Mainz 05	Heimstetten
18:00		report		Stadium: Sportpark Heimstetten; Attendance: 1000; Referee: unknown

=== 2. Bundesliga ===
==== League table ====
Pos	Team	Pld	W	D	L	GF	GA	GD	Pts	Promotion, qualification or relegation
13	1. FC Heidenheim	34	11	9	14	50	56	−6	42	
14	Dynamo Dresden	34	11	8	15	42	52	−10	41	
15	Greuther Fürth	34	10	10	14	37	48	−11	40	
16	Erzgebirge Aue (O)	34	10	10	14	35	49	−14	40	Qualification to relegation play-offs
17	Eintracht Braunschweig (R)	34	8	15	11	37	43	−6	39	Relegation to 3. Liga

Source: DFB
Rules for classification: 1) Points; 2) Goal difference; 3) Goals scored
(O) Play-off winners; (R) Relegated

==== Matches ====
29 July 2017 1	SV Darmstadt 98	1–0	Greuther Fürth	Darmstadt
15:30	Sulu 56'	report		Stadium: Merck-Stadion am Böllenfalltor; Attendance: 16,100; Referee: Sören Storks

6 August 2017 2	Greuther Fürth	1–2	Arminia Bielefeld	Fürth
15:30	Omladic 72'	report	Staude 38'; Klos 44'	Stadium: Sportpark Ronhof Thomas Sommer; Attendance: 9,070; Referee: Patrick Ittrich

20 August 2017 3	Holstein Kiel	3–1	Greuther Fürth	Kiel
13:30	Ducksch 20'; Schmidt 32'; Drexler 76'	report	Gjasula 12'	Stadium: Holstein-Stadion; Attendance: 8,535; Referee: Markus Schmidt

25 August 2017 4	Greuther Fürth	0–1	FC Ingolstadt	Fürth
18:30		report	Kittel 55'	Stadium: Sportpark Ronhof Thomas Sommer; Attendance: 8,655; Referee: Manuel Gräfe

8 September 2017 5	Dynamo Dresden	1–1	Greuther Fürth	Dresden
18:30	Heise 36'	report	Hofmann 82'	Stadium: DDV-Stadion; Attendance: 28,016; Referee: Martin Thomsen (Kleve)

17 September 2017 6	Greuther Fürth	3–1	Fortuna Düsseldorf	Fürth
13:30	Dursun 35' 63'; Caligiuri 44'	report	Gießelmann 62'	Stadium: Sportpark Ronhof Thomas Sommer; Attendance: 8,535; Referee: Martin Petersen

20 September 2017 7	Eintracht Braunschweig	3–0	Greuther Fürth	Braunschweig
18:30	Nyman 22'; Baffo 28'; Kumbela 79'	Report		Stadium: Eintracht-Stadion; Attendance: 18,785; Referee: Matthias Jöllenbeck

24 September 2017 8	Greuther Fürth	1–3	1. FC Nürnberg	Fürth
13:30	Gjasula 79' (pen.)	Report	Ishak 9'; Teuchert 58'; Behrens 90+3'	Stadium: Sportpark Ronhof Thomas Sommer; Attendance: 13,550; Referee: Felix Zwayer

29 September 2017 9	1. FC Kaiserslautern	3–0	Greuther Fürth	Kaiserslautern
18:30	Andersson 71', 74', 80'	Report		Stadium: Fritz-Walter-Stadion; Attendance: 19,179; Referee: Sören Storks

15 October 2017 10	Greuther Fürth	2–1	Erzgebirge Aue	Fürth
13:30	Narey 40'; Steininger 87'	Report	Bunjaku 78'	Stadium: Sportpark Ronhof Thomas Sommer; Attendance: 9,510; Referee: René Rohde

21 October 2017 11	1. FC Union Berlin	3–1	Greuther Fürth	Berlin
13:00	Kurzweg 3'; Gogia 41'; Hedlund 76'	Report	Wittek 57'	Stadium: Stadion An der Alten Försterei; Attendance: 21,344; Referee: Martin Petersen

=== DFB-Pokal ===
13 August 2017 R1	SV Morlautern	0–5	SpVgg Fürth	Pirmasens (Note: The match took place at the Sportpark Husterhöhe in Pirmasens instead of SV Morlautern's home stadium.)
15:30		Report	Hofmann 16', 18'; Raum 58'; Dursun 85'; Ernst 86'	Stadium: Sportpark Husterhöhe; Attendance: 2,800; Referee: Robert Kempter

24 October 2017 R2	SpVgg Fürth	1–3	FC Ingolstadt	Fürth
20:45	Raum 46'; Ayçiçek (yellow card) 72'	Report	Sekine (yellow card) 27'; Cohen 48' (pen.) (yellow card) 51'; Morales (yellow card) 71' (goal) 87'; Gaus (yellow card) 73'; Lex 83'	Stadium: Sportpark Ronhof Thomas Sommer; Attendance: 4,925; Referee: (Germany) Harm Osmers
