= Reinhold Yabo =

German footballer (born 1992)

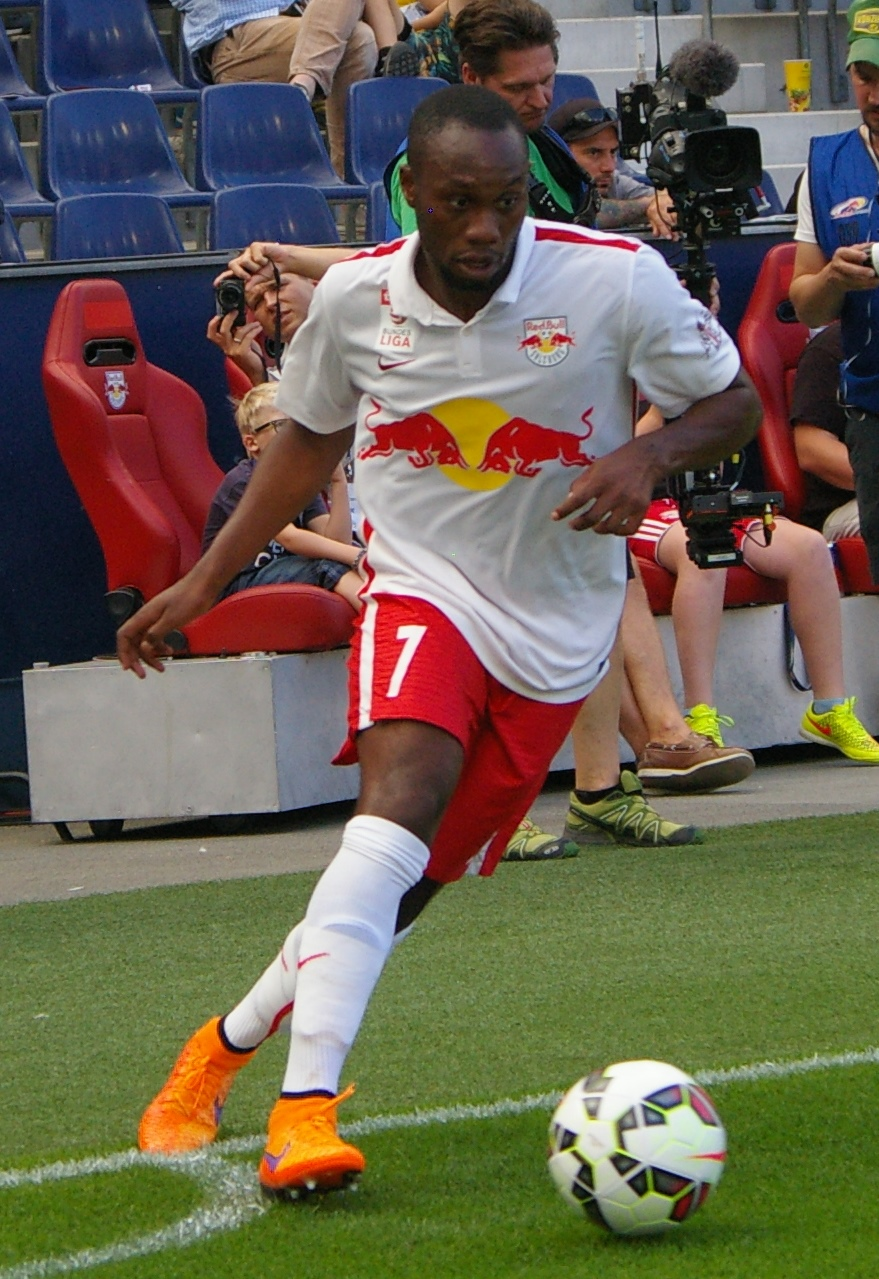
- Yabo playing for Red Bull Salzburg in 2015

Personal information
- Date of birth: 10 February 1992 (age 34)
- Place of birth: Aldenhoven, Germany
- Height: 1.75 m (5 ft 9 in)
- Position: Defensive midfielder

Youth career
- 1997–2001: Teutonia Niedermerz
- 2001–2009: 1. FC Köln

Senior career*
Years	Team	Apps	(Gls)
2009–2013	1. FC Köln	5	(0)
2009–2013	→ 1. FC Köln II	58	(17)
2011–2012	→ Alemannia Aachen (loan)	17	(0)
2013–2015	Karlsruher SC	62	(6)
2015–2019	Red Bull Salzburg	35	(3)
2017	→ Arminia Bielefeld (loan)	14	(4)
2019–2021	Arminia Bielefeld	52	(7)
Total		243	(37)

International career
2007	Germany U15	2	(0)
2007–2008	Germany U16	11	(1)
2008–2009	Germany U17	20	(1)
2009–2010	Germany U18	4	(0)
2010–2011	Germany U19	13	(1)
2011–2012	Germany U20	10	(0)
Medal record
Men's football
Representing Germany
UEFA European Under-17 Championship
Winner	2009 Germany
- * Club domestic league appearances and goals

Reinhold Yabo (born 10 February 1992) is a German former professional footballer who played as a midfielder.

== Career ==
Yabo began his career with Teutonia Niedermerz and joined 2001 into the youth of 1. FC Köln. He was to begin of the 2009–10 season promoted in the A-Jugend Bundesliga West, but he earned his first game on senior side for 1. FC Köln II on 8 August 2009 against Fortuna Düsseldorf II in the Regionalliga West.

After four games more for the reserve team of 1. FC Köln he earned his first Bundesliga game against VfL Bochum on 16 April 2010.

Yabo announced his retirement from playing aged 29 in May 2021, at the conclusion of the 2020–21 season, due to knee problems.

== International career ==
Yabo was the captain of the Germany under-17 national team at the 2009 UEFA European Under-17 Football Championship in Germany and won the European Championship with the team. Later tat year he played at the 2009 World Cup earning four caps in the tournament in Nigeria.

== Personal life ==
Yabo was born in Aldenhoven to Congolese parents. On 25 May 2014, he was elected as a member of the city council of Karlsruhe.

== Career statistics ==
Appearances and goals by club, season and competition
Club	Season	League			Cup		Other		Total	
Club	Season	Division	Apps	Goals	Apps	Goals	Apps	Goals	Apps	Goals
1. FC Köln	2009–10	Bundesliga	1	0	0	0	—		1	0
1. FC Köln	2010–11	Bundesliga	4	0	0	0	—		4	0
1. FC Köln	Total		5	0	0	0	0	0	5	0
1. FC Köln II	2009–10	Regionalliga West	5	2	—				5	2
1. FC Köln II	2010–11	Regionalliga West	24	9	—				24	9
1. FC Köln II	2012–13	Regionalliga West	29	6	—				29	6
1. FC Köln II	Total		58	17	0	0	0	0	58	17
Alemannia Aachen (loan)	2011–12	2. Bundesliga	17	0	1	0	—		18	0
Karlsruher SC	2013–14	2. Bundesliga	31	1	1	0	—		32	1
Karlsruher SC	2014–15	2. Bundesliga	31	5	1	0	2 (Note: Appearances in the 2015 Bundesliga play-offs)	1	34	6
Karlsruher SC	Total		62	6	2	0	2	1	66	7
Red Bull Salzburg	2016–17	Austrian Football Bundesliga	2	0	2	2	1 (Note: Appearance in the UEFA Europa League)	0	5	2
Red Bull Salzburg	2017–18	Austrian Football Bundesliga	24	2	2	1	12 (Note: Three appearances in the UEFA Champions League, nine appearances in the UEFA Europa League)	0	38	3
Red Bull Salzburg	2018–19	Austrian Football Bundesliga	9	1	2	2	6 (Note: Two appearances in the UEFA Europa League, four appearances in the UEFA Champions League)	0	17	3
Red Bull Salzburg	Total		35	3	6	5	19	0	60	8
Arminia Bielefeld (loan)	2016–17	2. Bundesliga	14	4	0	0	—		14	4
Arminia Bielefeld	2018–19	2. Bundesliga	15	2	0	0	—		15	2
Arminia Bielefeld	2019–20	2. Bundesliga	24	4	1	0	—		25	4
Arminia Bielefeld	2020–21	Bundesliga	13	1	0	0	—		13	1
Arminia Bielefeld	Total		52	7	1	0	0	0	53	7
Career total			243	37	10	5	21	1	274	43

== Honours ==
- 2009: UEFA European Under-17 Football Championship
- 2009: Fritz-Walter-Medaille
- 2009: Honorary Citizen of Aldenhoven
