= Marius Strangl =

German footballer

Personal information
- Date of birth: October 2, 1990 (age 36)
- Place of birth: Erlangen, Germany
- Position: Defensive midfielder

Team information
- Current team: SpVgg Bayreuth

Youth career
- SpVgg Erlangen
- FSV Erlangen-Bruck
- –2010: SpVgg Greuther Fürth

Senior career*
Years	Team	Apps	(Gls)
2009–2012	SpVgg Greuther Fürth II	84	(5)
2009–2012	SpVgg Greuther Fürth	4	(0)
2012–2014	Rot-Weiss Erfurt	37	(3)
2014–	SpVgg Bayreuth	0	(0)
- * Club domestic league appearances and goals as of 13 August 2014

Marius Strangl (born October 2, 1990) is a German footballer who plays for SpVgg Bayreuth.
