= Mathias Moritz =

German footballer

Personal information
- Date of birth: 21 February 1988 (age 38)
- Place of birth: Karlsruhe, West Germany
- Height: 1.86 m (6 ft 1 in)
- Position: Goalkeeper

Youth career
- SG Siemens Karlsruhe
- –2007: Karlsruher SC

Senior career*
Years	Team	Apps	(Gls)
2007–2013	Karlsruher SC II	63	(0)
2012–2013	Karlsruher SC	2	(0)
Total		2	(0)
- * Club domestic league appearances and goals

Mathias Moritz (born 21 February 1988) is a German former professional footballer who played as a goalkeeper. He began his career with Karlsruher SC, and made his debut for the club in October 2012, in a 0–0 draw with SpVgg Unterhaching in the 3. Liga.
