= Steffen Haas =

German footballer

Personal information
- Full name: Steffen Haas
- Date of birth: 18 March 1988 (age 38)
- Place of birth: Karlsruhe, West Germany
- Height: 1.84 m (6 ft 0 in)
- Position: Midfielder

Team information
- Current team: SpVgg Durlach-Aue
- Number: 5

Youth career
- SpVgg Durlach-Aue
- –2004: Karlsruher SC
- 2004–2007: 1899 Hoffenheim

Senior career*
Years	Team	Apps	(Gls)
2006–2009	1899 Hoffenheim	21	(0)
2008–2009	→ Kickers Offenbach (loan)	35	(5)
2009–2011	Kickers Offenbach	94	(12)
2011–2014	Karlsruher SC	43	(2)
2014	SV Wehen Wiesbaden	12	(0)
2014–2018	FC Astoria Walldorf	54	(2)
2020–	SpVgg Durlach-Aue	1	(0)
Total		260	(21)

International career
2005	Germany U18	2	(0)
2007	Germany U20	5	(0)
- * Club domestic league appearances and goals

Steffen Haas (born 18 March 1988 in Karlsruhe) is a German footballer who played as a midfielder for SpVgg Durlach-Aue.
