= Manuel Torres (footballer, born 1991) =

Spanish footballer

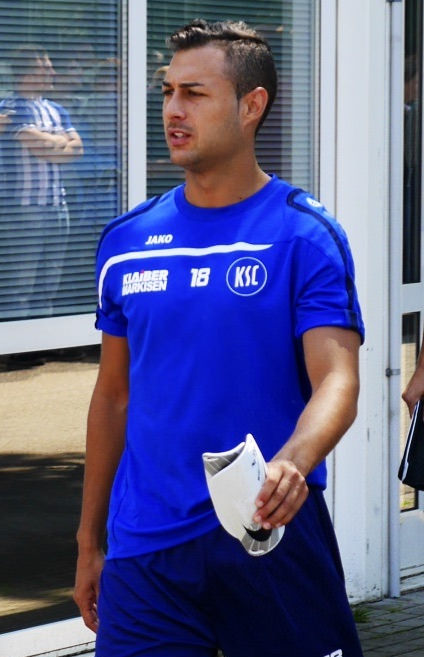
- Torres in 2015

Personal information
- Full name: Manuel Torres Jiménez
- Date of birth: 5 January 1991 (age 35)
- Place of birth: La Algaba, Spain
- Height: 1.75 m (5 ft 9 in)
- Position: Attacking midfielder

Team information
- Current team: St Joseph's
- Number: 18

Youth career
- 2004–2010: Betis

Senior career*
Years	Team	Apps	(Gls)
2010	Villarreal B	2	(0)
2011	Mallorca B	0	(0)
2011–2013	Schalke 04 II	62	(19)
2013–2017	Karlsruher SC	98	(14)
2017–2018	Greuther Fürth	7	(0)
2018–2022	AEL Limassol	95	(11)
2022–2025	Wieczysta Kraków	84	(32)
2025–	St Joseph's	18	(5)
- * Club domestic league appearances and goals as of 20:17, 21 March 2026 (UTC)

Manuel Torres Jiménez (born 5 January 1991) is a Spanish professional footballer who plays as an attacking midfielder for Gibraltar Football League club St Joseph's.

He spent most of his career in Germany, starting out at Schalke 04's reserves.

== Club career ==
Born in La Algaba, Province of Seville, Andalusia, Torres played youth football with local club Real Betis. His professional input in his homeland consisted of two Segunda División games as a substitute with Villarreal CF's B team, the first being on 27 August 2010 in a 3–0 away loss against Real Valladolid.

In the summer of 2011, 20-year-old Torres moved to Germany and signed for FC Schalke 04, being assigned to the reserve side in Regionalliga West. Two years later, upon expiration of his two-year contract, he joined Karlsruher SC also in the country on a three-year deal. He made his professional debut in German football on 16 August 2013, playing the last minutes of the 1–2 2. Bundesliga home defeat to SpVgg Greuther Fürth.

Torres was often deployed as a right winger during his spell at the Wildparkstadion. He scored his first league goal for the team on 20 October 2013, contributing to a 2–2 draw at 1. FC Kaiserslautern.

On 9 June 2017, the free agent Torres signed with Greuther Fürth for three seasons. He left the club in the following transfer window having failed to find the net and provided one assist, and joined AEL Limassol from the Cypriot First Division.

Torres agreed to a two-year deal at Polish III liga team Wieczysta Kraków on 7 September 2022. In June 2025, after contributing to two successive promotions, he was released upon the expiration of his contract.

On 11 August 2025, Torres joined Gibraltar Football League side St Joseph's FC.

== Career statistics ==
As of match played on 24 May 2025

Appearances and goals by club, season and competition
Club	Season	League			National cup (Note: Includes Copa del Rey, DFB-Pokal, Cypriot Cup, Polish Cup)		Continental		Total	
Club	Season	Division	Apps	Goals	Apps	Goals	Apps	Goals	Apps	Goals
Villarreal B	2011–11	Segunda División	2	0	—		—		2	0
Schalke 04 II	2011–12	Regionalliga	32	8	—		—		32	8
Schalke 04 II	2012–13	Regionalliga	30	11	—		—		30	11
Schalke 04 II	Total		62	19	—		—		62	19
Karlsruher SC	2013–14	2. Bundesliga	27	4	0	0	—		27	4
Karlsruher SC	2014–15	2. Bundesliga	31	5	2	0	2 (Note: Appearances in promotion play-offs)	0	35	5
Karlsruher SC	2015–16	2. Bundesliga	30	5	1	0	—		31	5
Karlsruher SC	2016–17	2. Bundesliga	10	0	1	0	—		11	5
Karlsruher SC	Total		98	14	4	0	2	0	104	14
Greuther Fürth	2017–18	2. Bundesliga	7	0	1	0	—		8	0
AEL Limassol	2017–18	Cypriot First Division	15	1	0	0	—		15	1
AEL Limassol	2018–19	Cypriot First Division	12	3	0	0	—		12	3
AEL Limassol	2019–20	Cypriot First Division	13	1	1 (Note: Appearance in Cypriot Super Cup)	0	—		14	1
AEL Limassol	2020–21	Cypriot First Division	32	5	5	0	—		37	5
AEL Limassol	2021–22	Cypriot First Division	23	1	4	0	4 (Note: Appearances in UEFA Europa Conference League)	0	31	1
AEL Limassol	Total		95	11	10	0	4	0	109	11
Wieczysta Kraków	2022–23	III liga, group IV	26	10	0	0	—		26	10
Wieczysta Kraków	2023–24	III liga, group IV	28	14	1	0	—		29	14
Wieczysta Kraków	2024–25	II liga	30	8	—		—		30	8
Wieczysta Kraków	Total		84	32	1	0	—		85	32
Career total			350	76	16	0	6	0	372	76

== Honours ==
Wieczysta Kraków

- III liga, group IV: 2023–24
- Polish Cup (Lesser Poland regionals): 2022–23
