= Thomas Birk =

German footballer

Personal information
- Date of birth: 5 July 1988 (age 38)
- Place of birth: Wittenberg, East Germany
- Height: 1.76 m (5 ft 9 in)
- Position: Defender

Youth career
- –2003: TSV Treuenbrietzen
- 2003–2007: Energie Cottbus

Senior career*
Years	Team	Apps	(Gls)
2007–2010	Energie Cottbus II	44	(0)
2010–2011	Erzgebirge Aue	22	(0)
2011–2014	Chemnitzer FC	91	(0)
2014–2018	SV Elversberg	96	(5)
2018	SV Röchling Völklingen	13	(1)
2018–2021	Racing FC	43	(4)
Total		309	(10)
- * Club domestic league appearances and goals

Thomas Birk (born 5 July 1988) is a German former professional footballer who played as a defender.
