= Selçuk Alibaz =

Turkish footballer

Personal information
- Date of birth: 3 December 1989 (age 36)
- Place of birth: Bretten, West Germany
- Height: 1.72 m (5 ft 8 in)
- Position: Right midfielder

Team information
- Current team: Fethiyespor
- Number: 33

Youth career
- TSV Kürnbach
- –2008: SV Sandhausen

Senior career*
Years	Team	Apps	(Gls)
2008–2010	Eskişehirspor	1	(0)
2010	→ Afyonkarahisarspor (loan)	12	(4)
2010	SC Paderborn	0	(0)
2011–2012	Jahn Regensburg	43	(5)
2012–2015	Karlsruher SC	74	(8)
2015	Erzgebirge Aue	13	(1)
2015–2016	Konyaspor	5	(0)
2016–2017	Fortuna Köln	25	(2)
2017–2018	Hansa Rostock	21	(1)
2018–2019	Fatih Karagümrük	34	(5)
2020–2021	Bandırmaspor	34	(3)
2021–2022	Tuzlaspor	14	(1)
2022	Sakaryaspor	7	(0)
2022–	Fethiyespor	44	(13)

International career
2009	Turkey U21	1	(0)
- * Club domestic league appearances and goals as of 10:32, 11 December 2023 (UTC)

Selçuk Alibaz (born 3 December 1989) is a professional footballer who plays as a midfielder for Fethiyespor.

== Career ==
German-born Alibaz earned his sole cap in the Turkish Süper Lig with Eskişehirspor on 26 April 2009 in a match against Trabzonspor before being loaned out to third-tier club Afyonkarahisarspor and eventually returning to Germany.

In January 2015, he moved to fellow 2. Bundesliga club Erzgebirge Aue, signing a contract until the end of the season including an extension clause.

On 2 August 2017, Alibaz signed a one-year contract with Hansa Rostock including the option of a further year, following a trial.

== Career statistics ==
As of match played 16 December 2017

Appearances and goals by club, season and competition
Club	Season	League			National Cup		Other		Total	
Club	Season	Division	Apps	Goals	Apps	Goals	Apps	Goals	Apps	Goals
Eskişehirspor	2008–09	Süper Lig	1	0	3	0	—		4	0
Eskişehirspor	2009–10	Süper Lig	0	0	0	0	—		0	0
Eskişehirspor	Total		1	0	3	0	0	0	4	0
Jahn Regensburg	2010–11	3. Liga	12	1	0	0	—		12	1
Jahn Regensburg	2011–12	3. Liga	31	4	1	0	2 (Note: Appearances in the 3. Liga promotion play-offs)	1	34	5
Jahn Regensburg	Total		43	5	1	0	2	1	46	6
Karlsruher SC	2012–13	3. Liga	34	4	3	1	—		37	5
Karlsruher SC	2013–14	2. Bundesliga	32	3	1	1	—		33	4
Karlsruher SC	2014–15	2. Bundesliga	8	1	1	0	—		9	1
Karlsruher SC	Total		74	8	5	2	0	0	79	10
Erzgebirge Aue	2014–15	2. Bundesliga	13	1	—		—		13	1
Konyaspor	2015–16	Süper Lig	5	0	8	0	—		13	0
Fortuna Köln	2016–17	3. Liga	25	2	—		—		25	2
Hansa Rostock	2017–18	3. Liga	12	1	1	0	—		13	1
Career total			173	17	18	2	2	1	193	20
