= Yasin Yılmaz =

Turkish-German footballer

Personal information
- Date of birth: 19 February 1989 (age 37)
- Place of birth: Munich, West Germany
- Height: 1.81 m (5 ft 11 in)
- Position: Midfielder

Team information
- Current team: FC Deisenhofen
- Number: 10

Youth career
- 1996–2000: SF Harteck
- 2000–2004: SpVgg Feldmoching
- 2004–2007: Bayern Munich
- 2007–2008: SpVgg Unterhaching

Senior career*
Years	Team	Apps	(Gls)
2008–2011	SpVgg Unterhaching II	85	(14)
2010–2013	SpVgg Unterhaching	53	(5)
2013–2014	Adanaspor	4	(0)
2014	Tarsus Idman Yurdu	4	(0)
2014–2017	FC Unterföhring	59	(9)
2017–2020	Türkgücü München	69	(35)
2020–2022	Türkspor Augsburg	12	(5)
2022–2024	FC Ismaning	44	(14)
2024–	FC Deisenhofen	32	(10)
- * Club domestic league appearances and goals as of 21 July 2024

Yasin Yılmaz (born 19 February 1989) is a Turkish-German professional footballer who plays as a midfielder for Bayernliga club FC Deisenhofen.

== Career ==
Yılmaz played in Bayern Munich's youth system, before being released in 2007 and signing for neighbours SpVgg Unterhaching. After a few years in the club's reserve team, he made his debut in a 3. Liga match against Bayern Munich II in February 2011, as a substitute for Tim Jerat. Since then he held down a regular place in the first team, before leaving the club at the end of the 2012–13 season to join Adanaspor.
