= Patrick Dulleck =

German professional footballer

Personal information
- Date of birth: 15 February 1990 (age 36)
- Place of birth: Malsch, West Germany
- Height: 1.84 m (6 ft 0 in)
- Position: Striker

Team information
- Current team: Lions Gibraltar
- Number: 18

Youth career
- TSV Spessart
- SG Siemens Karlsruhe
- –2000: Karlsruher SC
- SV Langensteinbach
- FC Astoria Walldorf
- –2007: 1899 Hoffenheim
- 2007–2009: Karlsruher SC

Senior career*
Years	Team	Apps	(Gls)
2009–2014	Karlsruher SC II	86	(26)
2009–2014	Karlsruher SC	28	(1)
2014–2016	SV Elversberg	36	(10)
2015	SV Elversberg II	6	(3)
2016–2017	TSV Steinbach	27	(10)
2017–2022	FC Homburg	155	(61)
2022–2023	SSV Ulm 1846	21	(2)
2023–2024	1. FC Düren	11	(3)
2024–	Lions Gibraltar	15	(0)
- * Club domestic league appearances and goals as of 3 May 2025

Patrick Dulleck (born 15 February 1990) is a German professional footballer who plays as a striker for Gibraltar Football League side Lions Gibraltar.

== Career ==
Dulleck began his career with Karlsruher SC and made his debut for the club in October 2009, as a substitute for Niklas Tarvajärvi in a 1–0 defeat to Fortuna Düsseldorf in the 2. Bundesliga. He signed for SV Elversberg at the end of the 2013–14 season.
