= Silvano Varnhagen =

German footballer

Personal information
- Date of birth: 4 February 1993 (age 33)
- Place of birth: Erfurt, Germany
- Height: 1.84 m (6 ft 0 in)
- Position: Defensive midfielder

Team information
- Current team: SV Eintracht Trier 05
- Number: 22

Youth career
- –2010: Rot-Weiss Erfurt
- 2010–2012: Karlsruher SC

Senior career*
Years	Team	Apps	(Gls)
2012–2015	Karlsruher SC	34	(1)
2015–	SV Eintracht Trier 05	3	(0)
- * Club domestic league appearances and goals as of 15 October 2015 (UTC)

Silvano Varnhagen (born 4 February 1993) is a German footballer who plays for SV Eintracht Trier 05.
