= Gaëtan Krebs =

French footballer (born 1985)

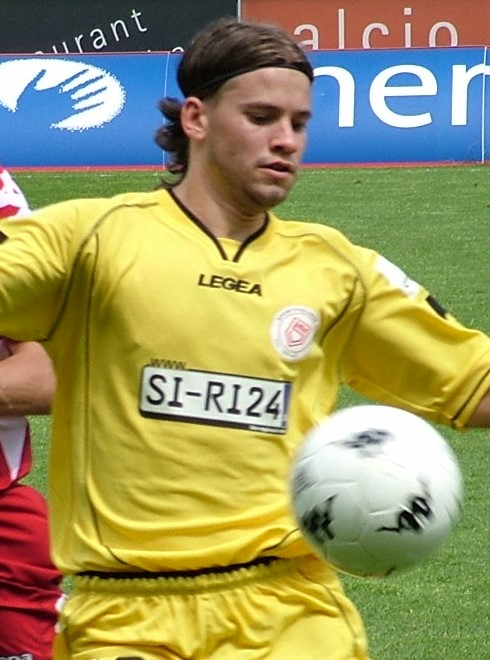
- Krebs during the 2006–07 season

Personal information
- Date of birth: 18 November 1985 (age 40)
- Place of birth: Mulhouse, France
- Height: 1.69 m (5 ft 7 in)
- Position: Midfielder

Youth career
- 1998–2000: FC Sentheim
- 2000–2001: Mulhouse
- 2001–2005: Strasbourg

Senior career*
Years	Team	Apps	(Gls)
2005–2007	Strasbourg	2	(0)
2006–2007	→ Spfr. Siegen (loan)	29	(12)
2007–2009	Hannover 96	20	(0)
2009–2017	Karlsruher SC	164	(13)
2017–2020	SV Elversberg	47	(3)
Total		262	(28)
- * Club domestic league appearances and goals

Gaëtan Krebs (born 18 November 1985) is a retired French professional footballer who played as a midfielder.

== Career ==
Krebs began his career in his native country with FC Sentheim and joined in 2000 to FC Mulhouse. In summer 2001 he left Mulhouse and signed with RC Strasbourg Alsace where he enjoyed success in the club's youth ranks, helping them through to the final of the Gambardella Cup in 2003.

Krebs finally made his senior debut during the 2005–06 season in a goalless home draw with Sochaux on 3 December 2005. However, he only managed one further league appearance for the club, although he did feature four times in their UEFA Cup campaign that season.

He was loaned out to German side Sportfreunde Siegen, playing in the Regionalliga Süd, in the 2006–07 season. Here, he scored his first senior goal, equalising at 1. FC Saarbrücken on 25 August 2006.

In June 2007, he moved permanently to top flight club Hannover 96 for €500,000 on an initial two-year contract until 30 June 2009.

On 2 June 2009, he signed a three-year contract with Karlsruher SC. With his contract set to expire, Krebs signed a new three-year deal with KSC in May 2012. He was part of the Karlsruhe team that won the 2012–13 3. Liga, having made 25 league appearances for the club that season. In November 2014, his contract was extended to summer 2017.

Krebs joined Regionalliga Südwest club SV Elversberg in summer 2017.
