= Daniel Gordon (footballer) =

Professional footballer (born 1985)

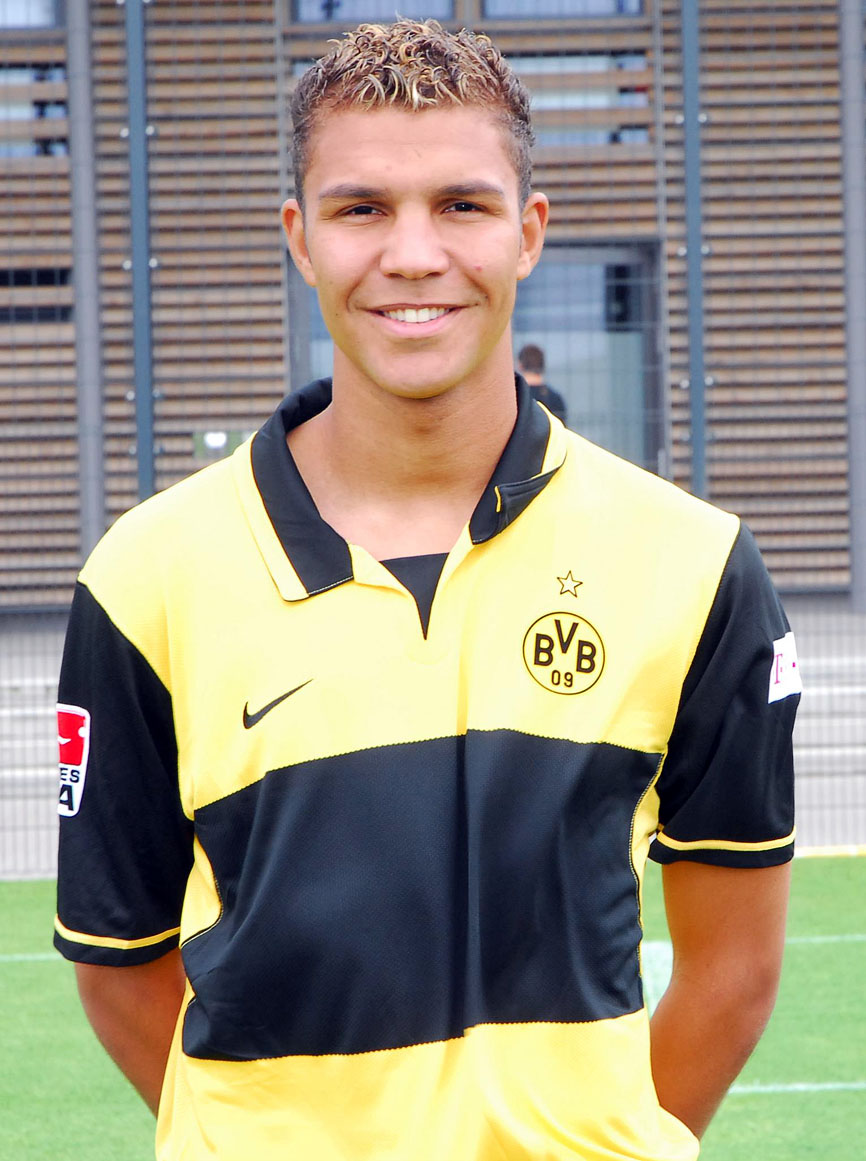
- Gordon with Borussia Dortmund in 2007

Personal information
- Full name: Daniel Stefan Gordon
- Date of birth: 16 January 1985 (age 41)
- Place of birth: Dortmund, West Germany
- Height: 1.94 m (6 ft 4 in)
- Position: Defender

Youth career
- –2000: Borussia Dortmund
- 2000–2004: VfL Bochum

Senior career*
Years	Team	Apps	(Gls)
2004–2006	VfL Bochum II	63	(6)
2006–2009	Borussia Dortmund	8	(0)
2006–2009	Borussia Dortmund II	69	(12)
2009–2011	Rot-Weiß Oberhausen	48	(7)
2011–2012	FSV Frankfurt	3	(0)
2011–2012	FSV Frankfurt II	10	(3)
2012–2016	Karlsruher SC	93	(6)
2016–2017	SV Sandhausen	26	(1)
2017–2020	Karlsruher SC	104	(10)
2020–2023	Karlsruher SC	58	(4)

International career
2013–2015	Jamaica	5	(1)
- * Club domestic league appearances and goals

Daniel Stefan Gordon (born 16 January 1985) is a former professional footballer who played as a defender. Born in Germany, he has represented the Jamaica national team.

== Club career ==
Gordon has played for Borussia Dortmund, VfL Bochum, Rot-Weiß Oberhausen, FSV Frankfurt, Karlsruher SC, and SV Sandhausen.

After Gordon's contract with Karlsruher SC expired in summer 2020, the club was still considering an extension in August. In September 2020, he signed a one-year contract with the club.

== International career ==
Gordon received his first call-up to the Jamaica national team on 30 May 2013 for the forthcoming World Cup qualification match against Mexico. He made his debut on 4 June 2013. Gordon scored his first international goal in the 3–0 friendly victory over Cuba.

== Coaching Career ==
Gordon has been part of the Karlsruher SC coaching staff as a co-trainer.

=== International goals ===
Score and Result shows Jamaica's goal tally first

No.	Date	Venue	Opponent	Score	Result	Competition	Ref.
1.	31 March 2015	Montego Bay Sports Complex, Montego Bay, Jamaica	Cuba	1–0		Friendly	

== Personal life ==
His father, Gary Gordon, is a British ex-soldier who worked as a youth coach at Borussia Dortmund.
