= Philipp Klingmann =

German footballer

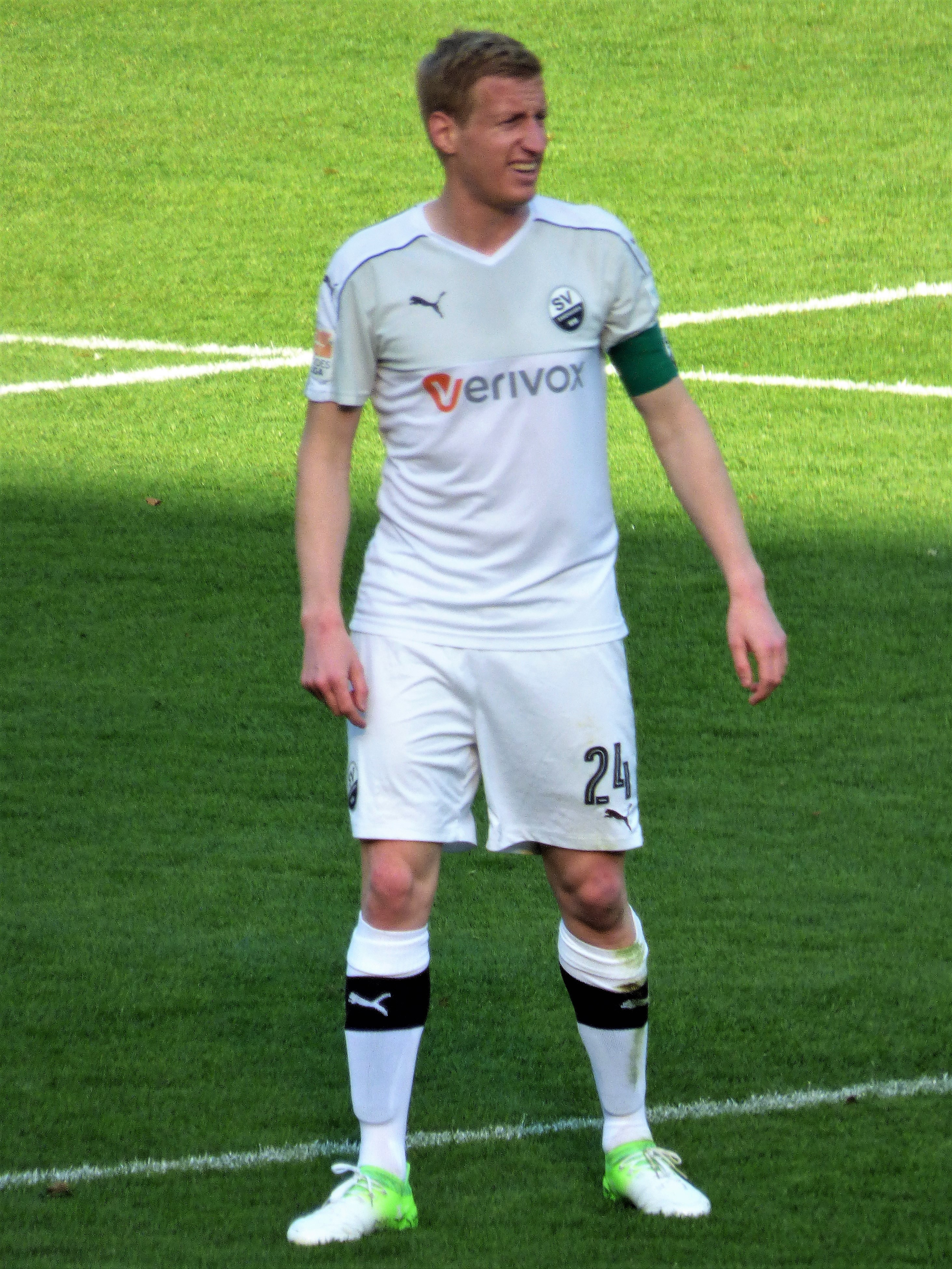
- Klingmann in 2017

Personal information
- Date of birth: 22 April 1988 (age 38)
- Place of birth: Heidelberg, West Germany
- Height: 1.80 m (5 ft 11 in)
- Position: Right-back

Youth career
- –2001: SC Germania Mönchzell
- 2001–2007: 1899 Hoffenheim

Senior career*
| Years | Team | Apps | (Gls) |
| 2007–2012 | 1899 Hoffenheim II | 133 | (20) |
| 2012–2015 | Karlsruher SC | 77 | (1) |
| 2014 | → Karlsruher SC II | 1 | (0) |
| 2015–2021 | SV Sandhausen | 105 | (7) |
- * Club domestic league appearances and goals as of 8 August 2021

Philipp Klingmann (born 22 August 1988) is a German professional footballer who plays as a right-back. He is currently without a club.
