= Koen van der Biezen =

Dutch footballer (born 1985)

Personal information
- Full name: Koen van der Biezen
- Date of birth: 10 July 1985 (age 41)
- Place of birth: Nuland, Netherlands
- Height: 1.93 m (6 ft 4 in)
- Position: Forward

Team information
- Current team: FC Engelen (head coach)

Youth career
- RKVV Nulandia
- –2004: TOP Oss
- 2004–2006: Utrecht

Senior career*
Years	Team	Apps	(Gls)
2006–2009	Den Bosch	89	(30)
2009–2011	Go Ahead Eagles	57	(29)
2011–2012	Cracovia	24	(4)
2012–2014	Karlsruher SC	75	(23)
2015–2016	Arminia Bielefeld	19	(1)
2016–2017	Paderborn	44	(5)
2018–2019	FC Oss	29	(1)
2019–2020	TEC	12	(2)
Total		349	(95)

Managerial career
- 2024–2025: SV CHC
- * Club domestic league appearances and goals

Koen van der Biezen (Dutch pronunciation: [ˈkuɱ vɑn dər ˈbizə(n)]; born 10 July 1985) is a Dutch retired footballer who played as a forward. He was the manager of SV CHC, but had to leave his post in summer 2025 since he does not have a UEFA licence for that level. He signed for lower league FC Engelen in February 2026.

== Career ==
Van der Biezen was born in Nuland and started playing football at local amateur outfit Nulandia, before making his professional debut with FC Den Bosch in the 2006/07 season. He moved to Go Ahead Eagles in 2009.

In July 2011, he joined Polish club Cracovia on a three-year contract.

On 31 July 2012, he moved to German 3. Liga side Karlsruher SC on a two-year contract. After several years abroad, he left another German side, Paderborn, and returned to the Netherlands in 2018 to sign for FC Oss.
