= Markus Kauczinski =

German football coach and manager (born 1970)

Personal information
- Date of birth: 20 February 1970 (age 56)
- Place of birth: Gelsenkirchen, West Germany

Team information
- Current team: 1860 Munich (manager)

Managerial career
- Years: Team
- 2009–2012: Karlsruher SC II
- 2009: Karlsruher SC (caretaker)
- 2010: Karlsruher SC (caretaker)
- 2011: Karlsruher SC (caretaker)
- 2012–2016: Karlsruher SC
- 2016: FC Ingolstadt
- 2017–2019: FC St. Pauli
- 2019–2021: Dynamo Dresden
- 2021–2024: Wehen Wiesbaden
- 2025–: 1860 Munich

Markus Kauczinski (born 20 February 1970) is a German football coach, who is the manager of 1860 Munich.

== Coaching career ==
Kauczinski started to coach Karlsruher SC II in May 2009 and continued in this role until March 2012 when he took over the senior squad. During his tenure as the reserve team head coach, he had three stints as interim head coach of the senior squad, the first of which happened from August 2009 to September 2009 when Karlsruhe hired Markus Schupp as their new head coach. Kauczinski's second stint happened from October 2010 to November 2010, ending only due to Kauczinski not having the required coaching license. His final stint as interim head coach happened from October 2011 to 6 November 2011 when Karlsruhe hired Jørn Andersen.

After four years as Karlsruhe's head coach, he took over FC Ingolstadt 04 for the 2016–17 Bundesliga season but was fired after scoring only two points in ten games. Next, Kauczinski was appointed as head coach of FC St. Pauli on 7 December 2017, staying in this position until being sacked on 10 April 2019. He was installed as head coach of Dynamo Dresden on 10 December 2019. After the club fell to fourth place, Kauczinski was sacked in April 2021.

In November 2021, he was signed by Wehen Wiesbaden. He was sacked in April 2024.

In October 2025, he became manager of 1860 Munich.

== Managerial statistics ==
As of match played 19 October 2025

Managerial record by team and tenure
Team	From	To	Record							
Team	From	To	G	W	D	L	GF	GA	GD	Win %
Karlsruher SC (caretaker)	18 August 2009	4 September 2009	2	1	0	1	3	5	−2	50.00
Karlsruher SC (caretaker)	31 October 2010	22 November 2010	3	0	2	1	2	4	−2	0.00
Karlsruher SC (caretaker)	30 October 2011	6 November 2011	1	1	0	0	3	2	+1	100.00
Karlsruher SC	26 March 2012	30 June 2016	158	69	52	37	220	144	+76	43.67
FC Ingolstadt	1 July 2016	6 November 2016	12	0	4	8	7	21	−14	0.00
FC St. Pauli	8 December 2017	10 April 2019	47	19	10	18	62	67	−5	40.43
Dynamo Dresden	10 December 2019	25 April 2021	51	24	9	18	70	61	+9	47.06
Wehen Wiesbaden	8 November 2021	28 April 2024	55	22	13	20	82	71	+11	40.00
1860 Munich	9 October 2025	Present	1	1	0	0	3	1	+2	100.00
Total			331	137	90	104	452	376	+76	41.39
