= Dominic Peitz =

German footballer

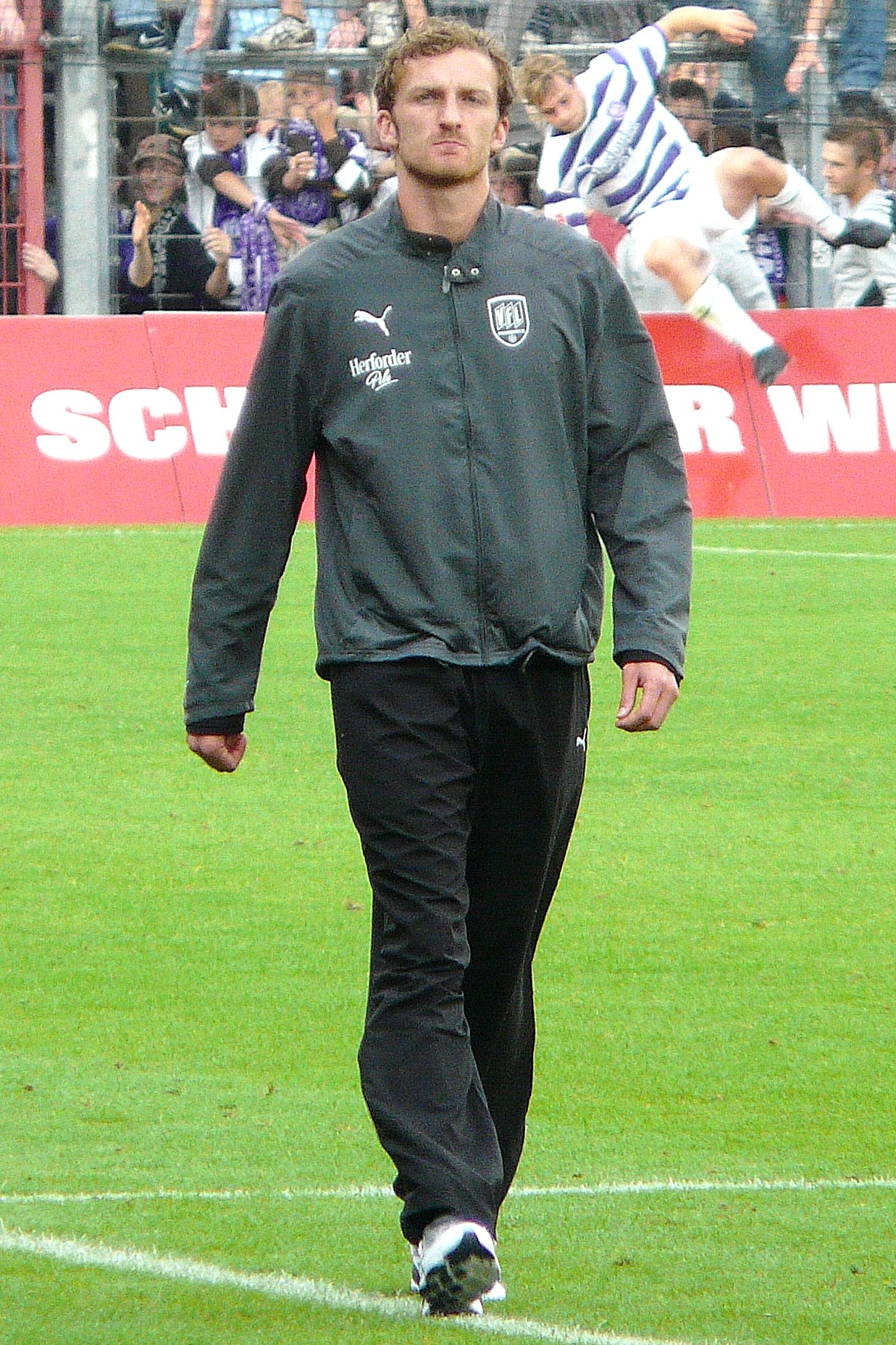
- Peitz with VfL Osnabrück in 2008

Personal information
- Date of birth: 11 September 1984 (age 42)
- Place of birth: Geseke, West Germany
- Height: 1.96 m (6 ft 5 in)
- Position: Midfielder

Team information
- Current team: Holstein Kiel (head of academy)

Youth career
- Blau-Weiss Geseke
- SC Paderborn

Senior career*
Years	Team	Apps	(Gls)
2003–2005	SC Paderborn	18	(2)
2005–2008	Werder Bremen II	89	(10)
2008–2009	VfL Osnabrück	33	(3)
2009–2011	Union Berlin	47	(5)
2011–2012	FC Augsburg	0	(0)
2011–2012	→ Hansa Rostock (loan)	19	(2)
2012–2016	Karlsruher SC	106	(7)
2016–2019	Holstein Kiel	61	(2)
2019–2020	Mainz 05 II	32	(5)
Total		405	(36)

Managerial career
- 2020–: Holstein Kiel (head of academy)
- * Club domestic league appearances and goals

Dominic Peitz (born 11 September 1984) is a German former professional footballer who played as a midfielder.

== Career ==
Born in Geseke, Peitz made his debut on the professional league level in the 2. Bundesliga for VfL Osnabrück on 15 August 2008 starting in a game against FC St. Pauli. On 25 August 2012, he signed a permanent contract with Karlsruher SC till 30 June 2015.

After retiring at the end of the 2019-20 season, Peitz was appointed director of Holstein Kiel's youth academy. At the end of 2022, he extended his contract with the club.
