= Dirk Orlishausen =

German footballer

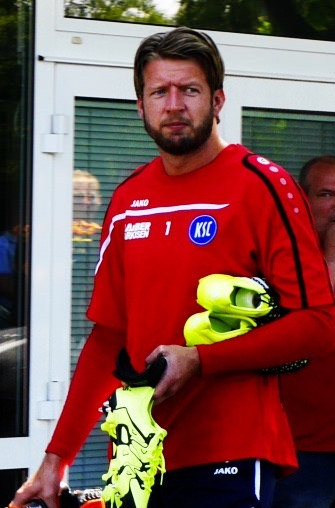
- Orlishausen with Karlsruher SC in 2015.

Personal information
- Date of birth: 15 August 1982 (age 44)
- Place of birth: Sömmerda, East Germany
- Height: 1.97 m (6 ft 6 in)
- Position: Goalkeeper

Team information
- Current team: Hansa Rostock (goalkeeper coach)

Senior career*
Years	Team	Apps	(Gls)
2003–2005	FSV Sömmerda		
2005–2011	Rot-Weiß Erfurt	168	(0)
2011–2018	Karlsruher SC	164	(0)
2018–2019	Hansa Rostock	0	(0)
- * Club domestic league appearances and goals

Dirk Orlishausen (born 15 August 1982) is a German former professional football goalkeeper, and currently the goalkeeper coach of Hansa Rostock.

== Playing career ==
Orlishausen started his senior career at hometown club FSV Sömmerda, where he played until the 2005–06 season before transferring to Rot-Weiß Erfurt. After eleven games on the bench, Orlishausen overtook Michael Ratajczak, played in 26 games in his first season and remained the club's first choice keeper until he joined Karlsruhe in the summer of 2011.

== Coaching career ==
In May 2018 Hansa Rostock announced that they had signed Orlishausen for the upcoming season on a three-year contract. Orlishausen was going to be the goalkeeper coach of the team and also the third keeper of the squad. He already had the goalkeeping coach license.
