= 2012–13 Alemannia Aachen season =

Alemannia Aachen
2012–13 season
- Chairman: Meino Heyen
- Manager: René van Eck
- Stadium: New Tivoli, Aachen, NRW
- 3. Liga: 20th (relegated)
- DFB-Pokal: First Round
- Top goalscorer: League: Kefkir (6); All: Kefkir (6)

The 2012–13 Alemannia Aachen season is the 113th season in the club's football history. In 2012–13, the club plays in the 3. Liga, the third tier of German football. It is the clubs first-ever season in this league, having been relegated from the 2. Bundesliga in 2012.

== Review and events ==
The club also took part in the 2012–13 edition of the DFB-Pokal, the German Cup, but was knocked out in the first round by Bundesliga side Borussia Mönchengladbach.

== Matches ==
=== Legend ===
Win Draw Loss Postponed

=== Friendly matches ===
17 June 2012 1	Hoengen / Mariadorf	0–10	Alemannia Aachen	Alsdorf
16:00			Borg 23', 26', 37'; Thiele 32'; Heller 45'; Pozder 56', 65', 73', 87'; Schumacher 66'	Attendance: 1,651

19 June 2012 2	FS Vfl Vichttal 08	1–8	Alemannia Aachen	Stolberg-Vicht
18:30	R. Wallica 24'		Timo Brauer 3'; Borg 36'; Thiele 40', 47'; Yücel 48' (o.g.); Olajengbesi 50'; Heller 74'; Demai 83'	Attendance: 1,400

24 June 2012 3	Kreisauswahl Düren	2–10	Alemannia Aachen	Niederzier
16:30	Strauch 52'; Strüver 54'		Heller 2', 35'; Andersen 26'; Rösler 28' (pen.); Thiele 39', 40', 42', 44', 65'; Kefkir 88'	Attendance: 1,200

27 June 2012 4	Fortuna Köln	0–1	Alemannia Aachen	Dürwiß
18:00			Pozder 89'

1 July 2012 5	FC Differdange	0–1	Alemannia Aachen	Differdange
16:00			Thiele 29'	Attendance: 400

6 July 2012 6	Eintracht Trier	1–0	Alemannia Aachen	Godenbrett
19:00	Fuchs 73'			Attendance: 552

10 July 2012 7	Alemannia Aachen	1–0	1. FC Köln	Aachen
19:00	Heller 4'			Stadium: New Tivoli; Attendance: 10,021; Referee: Guido Winkmann

14 July 2012 8	Alemannia Aachen	2–1	Rot-Weiß Essen	Aachen
17:00	Thiele 16', 52'		lenz 87'	Stadium: New Tivoli; Attendance: 4,895; Referee: Sören Storks

6 September 2012 9	Eintracht Verlautenheide	0–10	Alemannia Aachen	Verlautenheide
18:20			Borg 16'; Müller 16'; Sheen 40' (o.g.); Thiele 43'; Marquet 46'; Heller 48', 51'; Leipertz 65'; Stehle 76'; Schumacher 85'	Attendance: 600

9 January 2013 10	Alemannia Aachen	4–0	Jong Roda Kerkade	Aachen
12:00	Pozder 15'; Murakami 63'; Andersen 70'; Heller 90'			Attendance: 70

16 January 2013 11	Alemannia Aachen	3–0	Bayer Leverkusen II	Aachen
14:00	Murakami 34'; Borg 66', 84'			Stadium: New Tivoli; Attendance: 100

20 January 2013 12	Alemannia Aachen	2–5	Bayern Munich	Aachen
13:30	Thiele 14'; Schwertfeger 56'		Gómez 29', 80'; Boateng 41'; Robben 74', 77'	Stadium: New Tivoli; Attendance: 31,600

13 February 2013 13	Bayer Leverkusen II	3–1	Alemannia Aachen	Leverkusen
14:00	Kohr 40', 50'; Perrey 66'		Heller 46'	Attendance: 20

18 March 2013 14	Alemannia Aachen	3–3	Studentenauswahl Japan	Aachen
14:00	Kefkir 34', 68'; Göhsl 73'		Akasaki 14', 52'; Izumisawa 70'	Attendance: 60

20 March 2013 15	Alemannia Aachen	0–1	Fortuna Düsseldorf
19:30

20 March 2013 16	Alemannia Aachen	1–3	Bayer Leverkusen
21:30

=== 3. Liga ===
==== League results and fixtures ====
20 July 2012 1	Arminia Bielefeld	1–1	Alemannia Aachen	Bielefeld
20:15	Hille 21'	Report	Thiele 77'	Stadium: Bielefelder Alm; Attendance: 12,110; Referee: Bastian Dankert

28 July 2012 2	Alemannia Aachen	3–2	Wacker Burghausen	Aachen
14:00	Streit 25', 39'; Kefkir 21'	Report	Cinar 61'; Holz 90+2'	Stadium: New Tivoli; Attendance: 15,552; Referee: Thorsten Schriever

3 August 2012 3	Alemannia Aachen	1–1	Borussia Dortmund II	Aachen
19:00	Thiele 60'	Report	Halstenberg 42' (pen.)	Stadium: New Tivoli; Attendance: 19,543; Referee: Dr. Manuel Kunzmann

7 August 2012 4	1. FC Saarbrücken	1–2	Alemannia Aachen	Saarbrücken
19:00	Straith 31'	Report	Rösler 51'; Borg 83'	Stadium: Ludwigspark; Attendance: 6,377; Referee: Marcel Unger

11 August 2012 5	Alemannia Aachen	1–3	Kickers Offenbach	Aachen
14:00	Pozder 80'	Report	Fetsch 5', 35'; Husterer 47'	Stadium: New Tivoli; Attendance: 15,298; Referee: Eduard Beitinger

25 August 2012 6	Karlsruher SC	0–0	Alemannia Aachen	Karlsruhe
14:00		Report		Stadium: wildparkstadion Attendance: 11,436; Referee: Daniel Siebert

28 August 2012 7	Alemannia Aachen	1–1	Rot-Weiß Erfurt	Aachen
19:00	Müller 25'	Report	Morabit 14'	Stadium: New Tivoli; Attendance: 13,524; Referee: Timo Gerach

1 September 2012 8	Stuttgarter Kickers	3–1	Alemannia Aachen	Stuttgart
14:00	Savranlıoğlu 3'; Leist 59'; Grüttner 88'	Report	Baumgärtel 47'	Stadium: Gazi-Stadion; Attendance: 4,050; Referee: René Rohde

15 September 2012 9	Alemannia Aachen	1–3	SpVgg Unterhaching	Aachen
14:00	Heller 64'	Report	Willsch 57'; Hummels 70'; Niederlechner 86'	Stadium: New Tivoli; Attendance: 11,902; Referee: Harm Osmers

22 September 2012 10	SV Babelsberg 03	1–0	Alemannia Aachen	Potsdam
14:00	Heil 43'	Report		Stadium: Karl-Liebknecht-Stadion; Attendance: 2,833; Referee: Arne Aarnink

25 September 2012 11	Alemannia Aachen	1–2	SC Preußen Münster	Aachen
19:00	Pozder 49'	Report	Taylor 64', 84'	Stadium: New Tivoli; Attendance: 12,206; Referee: Martin Thomsen

29 September 2012 12	Chemnitzer FC	1–2	Alemannia Aachen	Chemnitz
14:00	Le Beau 80'	Report	Müller 85'; Pozder 89'	Stadium: Stadion an der Gellertstraße; Attendance: 4,800; Referee: Norbert Giese

6 October 2012 13	Alemannia Aachen	1–1	Darmstadt 98	Aachen
14:00	Pozder 61'	Report	Tatara 76'	Stadium: New Tivoli; Attendance: 13,003; Referee: Sören Storks

20 October 2012 14	Hansa Rostock	1–0	Alemannia Aachen	Rostock
14:00	Smetana 45'	Report		Stadium: DKB-Arena; Attendance: 10,000; Referee: Manuel Gräfe

27 October 2012 15	Alemannia Aachen	1–1	Wehen Wiesbaden	Aachen
14:00	Schwertfeger 81'	Report	Ivana 68'	Stadium: New Tivoli; Attendance: 11,500; Referee: Markus Schmidt

2 November 2012 16	1. FC Heidenheim	1–1	Alemannia Aachen	Heidenheim
19:00	Göhlert 70'	Report	Leipertz 43'	Stadium: Voith-Arena; Attendance: 8,200; Referee: Frank Willenborg

10 November 2012 17	Alemannia Aachen	0–3	Hallescher FC	Aachen
14:00		Report	Preuß 54'; Lindenhahn 88'; Mast 90+1'	Stadium: New Tivoli; Attendance: 10,953; Referee: Sven Jablonski

17 November 2012 18	VfB Stuttgart II	2–1	Alemannia Aachen	Stuttgart
14:00	Benyamina 27', 76'	Report	Schwertfeger 34'	Stadium: Gazi-Stadion auf der Waldau; Attendance: 710; Referee: Thomas Stein

24 November 2012 19	Alemannia Aachen	0–1	VfL Osnabrück	Aachen
14:00		Report	Glockner 79'	Stadium: New Tivoli; Attendance: 12,031; Referee: wolfgang Stark

1 December 2012 20	Alemannia Aachen	2–1	Arminia Bielefeld	Aachen
14:00	Leipertz 61', 89'	Report	Hille 59'	Stadium: New Tivoli; Attendance: 12,737; Referee: Marcel Unger

26 January 2013 23	Alemannia Aachen	2–0	1. FC Saarbrücken	Aachen
14:00	Kefkir 29'; Marquet 75'	Report		Stadium: New Tivoli; Attendance: 8,389; Referee: Martin Petersen

30 January 2013 21	Borussia Dortmund II	0–0	Alemannia Aachen	Dortmund
19:00				Stadium: Signal Iduna Park; Attendance: 3,100; Referee: Sven Jablonski

2 February 2013 24	Kickers Offenbach	1–1	Alemannia Aachen	Offenbach
14:00	Kleineheismann 79'	Report	Pozder 85'	Stadium: Sparda Bank Hessen Stadium; Attendance: 5,064; Referee: Patrick Hanslbauer

8 February 2013 25	Alemannia Aachen	0–4	Karlsruher SC	Aachen
19:00		Report	Hennings 36'; Van der Biezen 50'; Çalhanoğlu 54'; Varnhagen 57'	Stadium: New Tivoli; Attendance: 10,598; Referee: Bibiana Steinhaus

23 February 2013 27	Alemannia Aachen	3–0	Stuttgarter Kickers	Aachen
14:00	Schumacher 50', 76'; Heller 90+1'			Stadium: New Tivoli; Attendance: 7,766; Referee: Lothar Ostheimer

2 March 2013 28	SpVgg Unterhaching	1–0	Alemannia Aachen	Unterhaching
14:00	Voglsammer 53'	Report		Stadium: Generali Sportpark; Attendance: 1,300; Referee: Norbert Giese

9 March 2013 29	Alemannia Aachen	1–2	Babelsberg 03	Aachen
14:00	Touré 8' (o.g.)	Report	Murakami 52' (o.g.); Essig 86'	Stadium: New Tivoli; Attendance: 8,711; Referee: Eduard Beitinger

16 March 2013 30	Preußen Münster	4–1	Alemannia Aachen	Münster
14:00	Nazarov 42'; Strujić 51' (o.g.); Kara 79'; Kirch 81'	Report	Thiele 59'	Stadium: Preußenstadion; Attendance: 8,089; Referee: Christian Bandurski

23 March 2013 22	Wacker Burghausen	2–0	Alemannia Aachen	Burghausen
14:00	Luz 16'; Strujić 35' (o.g.)	Report		Stadium: Wacker-Arena; Attendance: 2,500; Referee: Dr. Manuel Kunzmann

30 March 2013 31	Alemannia Aachen	1–5	Chemnitzer FC	Aachen
14:00	Herröder 64'	Report	Semmer 13'; Fink 54', 69'; Förster 74'; Makarenko 88'	Stadium: New Tivoli; Attendance: 8,750; Referee: Sebastian Schmickartz

5 April 2013 32	Darmstadt 98	0–0	Alemannia Aachen	Darmstadt
19:00		Report		Stadium: Stadion am Böllenfalltor; Attendance: 5,800; Referee: Robert Kampka

12 April 2013 33	Alemannia Aachen	3–4	Hansa Rostock	Aachen
19:00	Thiele 23'; Kefkir 45', 62'	Report	Blum 22'; Weilandt 76'; Plat 79'; Smetana 82'	Stadium: New Tivoli; Attendance: 9,323; Referee: Tobias Stieler

16 April 2013 26	Rot-Weiß Erfurt	3–1	Alemannia Aachen	Erfurt
19:00	Pfingsten-Reddig 20'; Morabit 23'; Nielsen 27'	Report	Kefkir 89' (pen.)	Stadium: Steigerwaldstadion; Attendance: 4,198; Referee: Benjamin Brand

19 April 2013 34	Wehen Wiesbaden	3–2	Alemannia Aachen	Wiesbaden
19:00	Mintzel 20'; Zieba 26'; Müller 75'		Thiele 31'; Marquet 90+1'	Stadium: Brita-Arena; Attendance: 3,014; Referee: Martin Petersen

27 April 2013 35	Alemannia Aachen	1–2	1. FC Heidenheim	Aachen
14:00	Heller 84'	Report	Bagceci 50'; Schnatterer 73'	Stadium: New Tivoli; Attendance: 7,326; Referee: Marcel Göpferich

4 May 2013 36	Hallescher FC	1–0	Alemannia Aachen	Halle (Saale)
14:00	Furuholm 24'	Report		Stadium: Erdgas Sportpark; Attendance: 7,166; Referee: Florian Heft

11 May 2013 37	Alemannia Aachen	4–2	VfB Stuttgart II	Aachen
13:30	Leipertz 28', 89'; Murakami 57'; Kefkir 73'	Report	Maletić 65'; Breier 72'	Stadium: New Tivoli; Attendance: 8,892; Referee: Lothar Ostheimer

18 May 2013 38	VfL Osnabrück	4–0	Alemannia Aachen	Osnabrück
13:30				Stadium: osnatel ARENA

==== League table ====
===== Table summary =====
MP	Pts	W	D	L	GF	GA	GD	MP	Pts	W	D	L	GF	GA	GD	MP	Pts	W	D	L	GF	GA	GD
18	16	3	7	8	18	28	−10	9	7	1	4	4	10	17	−7	9	9	2	3	4	8	11	−3

=== DFB-Pokal ===
18 August 2012 1st Round	Alemannia Aachen	0 – 2	Borussia Mönchengladbach	Aachen
15:30		Report	Arango 70'; Nordtveit 90+1'	Stadium: New Tivoli; Attendance: 31,736; Referee: Felix Zwayer

=== FVM-Pokal ===
13 October 2012 1st Round	SV Eilendorf	0–5	Alemannia Aachen	Aachen
15:30		Report	Brauer 45'; Pozder 64'; Borg 81'; Heller 85'; Kefkir 88'	Stadium: New Tivoli; Attendance: 3,840; Referee: Ruven Fux

12 January 2013 2nd Round	FC Viktoria Köln 04	1–1 (a.e.t.) (1–4 p)	Alemannia Aachen	Köln
13:00	Bouhaddouz 52'	Report	Marquet 51'	Stadium: Sportpark Höhenberg; Attendance: 2,838; Referee: Andreas Steffens
	Penalties
	Wunderlich (penalty scored); Glowacz (penalty missed); Federico (penalty missed)		(penalty scored) Brauer; (penalty scored) Schwertfeger; (penalty scored) Kefkir; (penalty scored) Baumgärtel

20 February 2013 Quarter-final	TSV Germania Windeck	0–2	Alemannia Aachen	Aachen
19:00		Report	Schumacher 8'; Heller 66'	Stadium: New Tivoli; Attendance: 2,400; Referee: Tobias Altehenger

23 April 2013 Semi-final	Alemannia Aachen	2–1 (a.e.t.)	FC Wegberg-Beeck	Aachen
	Thiele 39'; Herröder 114'	Report	Dagistan 16'	Stadium: New Tivoli; Attendance: 2,500; Referee: Andreas Steffens

29 May 2013 Final	Alemannia Aachen	1–2	Fortuna Köln	Bonn
	Brauer 78'	Report	Klaus 19'; Fink 82'	Attendance: 4,715; Referee: Sascha Stegemann

== Squad ==
=== Squad, matches played and goals scored ===
As of 18 May 2013

No.	Pos	Nat	Player	Total		3. Liga		DFB-Pokal		FVM-Pokal	
No.	Pos	Nat	Player	Apps	Goals	Apps	Goals	Apps	Goals	Apps	Goals
12	GK	(Netherlands) NED	Mark Flekken	15	0	15	0	0	0	0	0
21	GK	(Germany) GER	Tim Krumpen	14	0	13	0	1	0	0	0
30	GK	(Germany) GER	Kevin Rauhut	2	0	2	0	0	0	0	0
37	GK	(Germany) GER	Marcel Simon^{2}	1	0	1	0	0	0	0	0
2	DF	(Germany) GER	Daniel Hofmann	0	0	0	0	0	0	0	0
4	DF	(Germany) GER	Jan-Frederick Göhsl	1	0	1	0	0	0	0	0
5	DF	(Germany) GER	Mario Erb	22	0	21	0	1	0	0	0
17	DF	(Germany) GER	Thomas Stehle	10	0	10	0	0	0	0	0
24	DF	(Germany) GER	Sascha Herröder	23	1	23	1	0	0	0	0
26	DF	(Poland) POL	Maciej Szewczyk ^{2}	1	0	1	0	0	0	0	0
27	DF	(Germany) GER	Sven Schaffrath ^{2}	6	0	6	0	0	0	0	0
35	DF	(Bosnia and Herzegovina) BIH	Saša Strujić	16	0	16	0	0	0	0	0
36	DF	(Germany) GER	Robert Wilschrey	17	0	17	0	0	0	0	0
40	DF	(Germany) GER	Marvin Ajani ^{2}	6	0	6	0	0	0	0	0
6	MF	(Germany) GER	Timo Brauer	29	0	28	0	1	0	0	0
7	MF	(Germany) GER	Oğuzhan Kefkir	33	6	32	6	1	0	0	0
8	MF	(Belgium) BEL	Kristoffer Andersen	25	0	25	0	0	0	0	0
11	MF	(Germany) GER	Sascha Rösler	8	1	7	1	1	0	0	0
13	MF	(Germany) GER	Robert Leipertz	19	5	19	5	0	0	0	0
14	MF	(Germany) GER	Dario Schumacher	10	2	10	2	0	0	0	0
15	MF	(Tunisia) TUN	Aimen Demai	2	0	2	0	0	0	0	0
16	MF	(Germany) GER	Florian Müller	14	2	14	2	0	0	0	0
18	MF	(Germany) GER	Sascha Marquet	24	2	23	2	1	0	0	0
20	MF	(Germany) GER	Marcel Heller	38	3	37	3	1	0	0	0
29	MF	(Germany) GER	Armand Drevina	15	0	15	0	0	0	0	0
32	MF	(Spain) ESP	Rafael García Doblas	2	0	2	0	0	0	0	0
33	MF	(Germany) GER	Dennis Lang	1	0	1	0	0	0	0	0
22	FW	(Germany) GER	Denis Pozder	24	5	23	5	1	0	0	0
23	FW	(Germany) GER	Timmy Thiele	30	5	29	5	1	0	0	0
28	FW	(Japan) JPN	Norikazu Murakami	14	1	14	1	0	0	0	0
34	FW	(Germany) GER	Phillipp Simon	3	0	3	0	0	0	0	0
Players sold or loaned out after the start of the season:
1	GK	(Germany) GER	Michael Melka	9	0	9	0	0	0	0	0
3	DF	(Germany) GER	Fabian Baumgärtel	21	1	20	1	1	0	0	0
4	DF	(Germany) GER	Kai Schwertfeger	21	2	20	2	1	0	0	0
19	DF	(Nigeria) NGA	Seyi Olajengbesi	19	0	18	0	1	0	0	0
10	MF	(Germany) GER	Albert Streit	17	2	16	2	1	0	0	0
25	MF	(Germany) GER	Christian Weber	9	0	9	0	0	0	0	0
9	FW	(Sweden) SWE	Freddy Borg	16	1	15	1	1	0	0	0

Notes

- ^{2} Player from the youth teams.

=== Transfers ===
==== In ====
No.	Pos.	Nat.	Name	Age	EU	Moving from	Type	Transfer window	Ends	Transfer fee	Source
6	MF	(Germany)	Timo Brauer	35	EU	Rot-Weiss Essen	Transfer	Summer	2014	Free	
1	GK	(Germany)	Michael Melka	47	EU	Rot-Weiß Oberhausen	Transfer	Summer	2014	Free	
7	MF	(Germany)	Oğuzhan Kefkir	34	EU	VfL Bochum	Transfer	Summer	2014	Free	
18	MF	(Germany)	Sascha Marquet	36	EU	Youth system	Promoted	Summer	2014	N/A	
22	FW	(Germany)	Denis Pozder	36	EU	Youth system	Promoted	Summer	2013	N/A	
11	MF	(Germany)	Sascha Rösler	48	EU	Fortuna Düsseldorf	Transfer	Summer	2013	Free	
20	MF	(Germany)	Marcel Heller	39	EU	Dynamo Dresden	Transfer	Summer	2014	Free	
3	DF	(Germany)	Fabian Baumgärtel	36	EU	SpVgg Greuther Fürth	loan	Summer	2013	Free	
14	MF	(Germany)	Dario Schumacher	32	EU	Youth system	Promoted	Summer	2014	N/A	
8	MF	(Belgium)	Kristoffer Andersen	40	EU	FC Ingolstadt	Transfer	Summer	2014	Free	
9	FW	(Sweden)	Freddy Borg	42	EU	Hansa Rostock	Transfer	Summer	2014	Free	
4	DF	(Germany)	Kai Schwertfeger	37	EU	Fortuna Düsseldorf	Transfer	Summer	2014	Free	
12	GK	(Netherlands)	Mark Flekken	32	EU	Youth system	Promoted	Summer	2014	N/A	
13	MF	(Germany)	Robert Leipertz	33	EU	Youth system	Promoted	Summer	2014	N/A	
24	DF	(Germany)	Sascha Herröder	37	EU	VfR Aalen	Transfer	Summer	2013	Free	
23	FW	(Germany)	Timmy Thiele	34	EU	Schalke 04 II	Transfer	Summer	2013	Free	
25	MF	(Germany)	Christian Weber	42	EU	Free agent	Transfer	Summer	2015	Free	
28	FW	(Japan)	Norikazu Murakami	44	Non-EU	Free agent	Transfer	Summer	2013	Free	
36	DF	(Germany)	Robert Wilschrey	36	EU	Youth system	Promoted	Winter	2013	N/A	
29	MF	(Germany)	Armand Drevina	32	EU	Youth system	Promoted	Winter	2013	N/A	
35	DF	(Bosnia and Herzegovina)	Saša Strujić	34	EU	Youth system	Promoted	Winter	2013	N/A	
32	MF	(Spain)	Rafael García	32	EU	Youth system	Promoted	Winter	2013	N/A	
4	DF	(Germany)	Jan Frederick Göhsl	33	EU	Youth system	Promoted	Winter	2013	N/A	
30	GK	(Germany)	Kevin Rauhut	36	EU	Youth system	Promoted	Winter	2013	N/A	
2	DF	(Germany)	Daniel Hofmann	33	EU	Youth system	Promoted	Winter	2013	N/A	
33	MF	(Germany)	Dennis Lang	36	EU	Youth system	Promoted	Winter	2013	N/A	
34	FW	(Germany)	Phillipp Simon	32	EU	Youth system	Promoted	Winter	2013	N/A	

==== Out ====
No.	Pos.	Nat.	Name	Age	EU	Moving to	Type	Transfer window	Transfer fee	Source
28	DF	(Germany)	Mirko Casper	43	EU	Bayer Leverkusen II	End of contract	Summer	N/A	
7	FW	(Germany)	Marco Stiepermann	34	EU	Borussia Dortmund	End of loan	Summer	N/A	
27	DF	(Germany)	Shervin Radjabali-Fardi	34	EU	Hertha BSC	End of loan	Summer	N/A	
20	MF	(Germany)	Reinhold Yabo	33	EU	1. FC Köln	End of loan	Summer	N/A	
5	DF	(Germany)	Tobias Feisthammel	37	EU	SC Paderborn	End of contract	Summer	N/A	
32	DF	(Germany)	Timo Achenbach	43	EU	SV Sandhausen	End of contract	Summer	N/A	
15	MF	(Germany)	Kevin Kratz	39	EU	Eintracht Braunschweig	End of contract	Summer	N/A	
8	MF	(Turkey)	Alper Uludağ	35		FC Ingolstadt	End of contract	Summer	N/A	
4	MF	(Germany)	Kevin Maek	37	EU	1. FC Saarbrücken	End of contract	Summer	N/A	
1	GK	(Germany)	David Hohs	37	EU	1. FC Kaiserslautern	End of contract	Summer	N/A	
2	DF	(Germany)	Kim Falkenberg	37	EU	SV Sandhausen	End of contract	Summer	N/A	
12	GK	(Netherlands)	Boy Waterman	42	EU	PSV	End of contract	Summer	N/A	
25	MF	(Germany)	Manuel Junglas	37	EU	VfR Aalen	End of contract	Summer	N/A	
10	MF	(Netherlands)	Anouar Hadouir	43	EU	NAC Breda	End of contract	Summer	N/A	
37	MF	(Germany)	David Odonkor	41	EU	Hoverla Uzhhorod	End of contract	Summer	N/A	
6	MF	(Netherlands)	Bas Sibum	43	EU	Waasland-Beveren	End of contract	Summer	N/A	
3	DF	(Germany)	Andreas Korte	36	EU	KFC Uerdingen	End of contract	Summer	N/A	
18	DF	(Germany)	Jonas Strifler	36	EU	Wacker Burghausen	End of contract	Summer	N/A	
	FW	(Germany)	Fabian Bäcker	35	EU	Kickers Offenbach	End of contract	Summer	N/A	
9	FW	(Germany)	Benjamin Auer	45	EU	Free agent	End of contract	Summer	N/A	
23	MF	(Turkey)	Bilal Çubukçu	38		Adana Demirspor	End of contract	Summer	N/A	
29	FW	(Romania)	Sergiu Radu	48	EU	Retired	End of contract	Summer	N/A	
10	MF	(Germany)	Albert Streit	45	EU	Viktoria Köln	Contract dissolved	Winter	N/A	
3	DF	(Germany)	Fabian Baumgärtel	36	EU	SpVgg Greuther Fürth	Contract dissolved	Winter	N/A	
25	MF	(Germany)	Christian Weber	42	EU	Fortuna Düsseldorf II	Contract dissolved	Winter	N/A	
9	FW	(Sweden)	Freddy Borg	42	EU	Darmstadt 98	Contract dissolved	Winter	N/A	
4	DF	(Germany)	Kai Schwertfeger	37	EU	Karlsruher SC	Contract dissolved	Winter	N/A	
19	DF	(Nigeria)	Seyi Olajengbesi	45	Non-EU	SV Sandhausen	Contract dissolved	Winter	N/A	
1	GK	(Germany)	Michael Melka	47	EU		Contract dissolved	Winter	N/A	
