= 2011–12 Alemannia Aachen season =

Alemannia Aachen
2011–12 season
- President: Alfred Nachtsheim
- Head Coach: Ralf Aussem
- 2. Bundesliga: 17th (relegated)
- DFB-Pokal: 1st Round (eliminated)
- Top goalscorer: Benjamin Auer (6)
Home colours	Away colours

The 2011–12 season of Alemannia Aachen began on 16 July 2011 with the first game in the 2. Bundesliga.

== Transfers ==
=== Summer transfers ===
In:

No.	Pos.	Nation	Player
2	DF	GER	Kim Falkenberg (form SpVgg Greuther Fürth)
3	DF	GER	Andreas Korte (from Alemannia Aachen II)
4	MF	GER	Kevin Maek (from Werder Bremen II)
6	MF	NED	Bas Sibum (from NEC)
7	FW	GER	Marco Stiepermann (on loan from Borussia Dortmund)
10	FW	NED	Anouar Hadouir (from Roda JC)
11	FW	GER	Fabian Bäcker (from Borussia Mönchengladbach)
12	GK	NED	Boy Waterman (from AZ, previously on loan at De Graafschap)
14	DF	GER	Mario Erb (from Bayern Munich II)
18	DF	GER	Jonas Strifler (from Dynamo Dresden)
20	MF	GER	Reinhold Yabo (on loan from 1. FC Köln)
22	MF	GER	Lennart Hartmann (from Hertha BSC)
37	MF	GER	David Odonkor (unattached)
--	FW	EST	Henrik Ojamaa (loan return from Fortuna Sittard)

Out:

No.	Pos.	Nation	Player
1	GK	GER	Thorsten Stuckmann (released)
2	DF	GER	Nico Herzig (to Wehen Wiesbaden)
7	MF	HUN	Zoltán Stieber (to 1. FSV Mainz 05)
8	MF	POL	Thomas Zdebel (released)
10	MF	GER	Thorsten Burkhardt (to Wehen Wiesbaden)
11	FW	GER	Markus Daun (retired)
13	GK	GER	Thomas Unger (released)
14	FW	SEN	Babacar Gueye (on loan to FSV Frankfurt)
18	MF	TUR	Tolgay Arslan (loan return to Hamburger SV)
21	FW	GER	Juvhel Tsoumou (to Preston North End F.C.)
37	MF	GER	Marco Höger (to FC Schalke 04)
--	FW	EST	Henrik Ojamaa (to Rovaniemen Palloseura)

=== Winter transfers ===
In:

No.	Pos.	Nation	Player
13	MF	GER	Albert Streit (unattached)

Out:

No.	Pos.	Nation	Player
11	FW	GER	Fabian Bäcker (on loan to Borussia Mönchengladbach II)
22	MF	GER	Lennart Hartmann (to SV Babelsberg 03)

== Statistics ==
=== Goals and appearances ===
No.	Pos	Nat	Player	Total		2. Liga		DFB-Pokal	
No.	Pos	Nat	Player	Apps	Goals	Apps	Goals	Apps	Goals
1	GK	(Germany) GER	David Hohs	3	0	3	0	0	0
2	DF	(Germany) GER	Kim Falkenberg	18	0	18	0	0	0
3	DF	(Germany) GER	Andreas Korte	0	0	0	0	0	0
4	DF	(Germany) GER	Kevin Maek	0	0	0	0	0	0
5	DF	(Germany) GER	Tobias Feisthammel	30	3	29	3	1	0
6	MF	(Netherlands) NED	Bas Sibum	31	2	30	2	1	0
7	FW	(Germany) GER	Marco Stiepermann	22	2	21	2	1	0
8	MF	(Turkey) TUR	Alper Uludağ	26	1	25	1	1	0
9	FW	(Germany) GER	Benjamin Auer	32	6	31	6	1	0
10	MF	(Netherlands) NED	Anouar Hadouir	12	0	11	0	1	0
12	GK	(Netherlands) NED	Boy Waterman	31	0	30	0	1	0
13	MF	(Germany) GER	Albert Streit	12	2	12	2	0	0
14	DF	(Germany) GER	Mario Erb	7	0	6	0	1	0
15	MF	(Germany) GER	Kevin Kratz	21	1	20	0	1	1
16	MF	(Germany) GER	Florian Müller	0	0	0	0	0	0
17	DF	(Germany) GER	Thomas Stehle	6	0	6	0	0	0
18	DF	(Germany) GER	Jonas Strifler	4	0	4	0	0	0
19	DF	(Nigeria) NGR	Seyi Olajengbesi	32	2	31	2	1	0
20	MF	(Germany) GER	Reinhold Yabo	18	0	17	0	1	0
21	GK	(Germany) GER	Tim Krumpen	2	0	2	0	0	0
23	MF	(Turkey) TUR	Bilal Cubukcu	0	0	0	0	0	0
25	MF	(Germany) GER	Manuel Junglas	23	0	22	0	1	0
26	MF	(Tunisia) TUN	Aïmen Demai	22	4	22	4	0	0
27	DF	(Germany) GER	Shervin Radjabali-Fardi	25	0	24	0	1	0
28	DF	(Germany) GER	Mirko Casper	7	0	7	0	0	0
29	FW	(Romania) ROU	Sergiu Radu	29	4	28	4	1	0
30	MF	(Angola) ANG	Narciso Lubasa	1	0	1	0	0	0
32	DF	(Germany) GER	Timo Achenbach	33	1	33	1	0	0
33	FW	(Germany) GER	Daniel Engelbrecht	0	0	0	0	0	0
35	MF	(Germany) GER	Sascha Marquet	4	0	4	0	0	0
37	FW	(Germany) GER	David Odonkor	23	2	23	2	0	0
Players sold or loaned out after the start of the season:
11	FW	(Germany) GER	Fabian Bäcker	1	0	1	0	0	0
22	MF	(Germany) GER	Lennart Hartmann	0	0	0	0	0	0

Last updated: 6 May 2012

== Results ==
=== 2. Bundesliga ===
16 July 2011 1	Erzgebirge Aue	1–0	Alemannia Aachen	Aue
13:00	Müller 53'	Report		Stadium: Erzgebirgsstadion; Attendance: 9,500; Referee: Peter Gagelmann

24 July 2011 2	Alemannia Aachen	0–2	Eintracht Braunschweig	Aachen
15:30		Report	Erb 15' o.g. Pfitzner 80'	Stadium: New Tivoli; Attendance: 17,541; Referee: Martin Petersen

5 August 2011 3	FC St. Pauli	3–1	Alemannia Aachen	Hamburg
18:00	Kruse 17', 90'; Bruns 45'	Report	Feisthammel 7'	Stadium: Millerntor-Stadion; Attendance: 23,517; Referee: Florian Steuer

13 August 2011 4	Alemannia Aachen	0–2	FC Energie Cottbus	Aachen
13:00		Report	Banovic 53'; Rangelov 74'	Stadium: New Tivoli; Attendance: 13,922; Referee: Tobias Christ

19 August 2011 5	F.C. Hansa Rostock	0–0	Alemannia Aachen	Rostock
18:00		Report		Stadium: DKB-Arena; Attendance: 14,700; Referee: Marcel Unger

27 August 2011 6	Alemannia Aachen	0–0	Fortuna Düsseldorf	Aachen
13:00		Report		Stadium: New Tivoli; Attendance: 23,000; Referee: Felix Brych

9 September 2011 7	SC Paderborn 07	0–0	Alemannia Aachen	Paderborn
18:00		Report		Stadium: Energieteam Arena; Attendance: 7,236; Referee: Martin Petersen

18 September 2011 8	Alemannia Aachen	0–0	SpVgg Greuther Fürth	Aachen
13:30		Report		Stadium: New Tivoli; Attendance: 14.867; Referee: Tobias Stieler

24 September 2011 9	Union Berlin	2–0	Alemannia Aachen	Berlin
13:00	Karl 39'; Mattuschka 88'	report		Stadium: Alte Försterei; Attendance: 14.889; Referee: Babak Rafati

30 September 2011 10	Alemannia Aachen	1–3	FSV Frankfurt	Aachen
18:00	Feisthammel 32'	report	Chrisantus 53', 69', 86'	Stadium: New Tivoli; Attendance: 15,179; Referee: Frank Willenborg

16 October 2011 11	Dynamo Dresden	1–1	Alemannia Aachen	Dresden
13:30	Fort 90+3'	Report	Demai 34' pen	Stadium: Glücksgas Stadion; Attendance: 28,309; Referee: Bibiana Steinhaus

23 October 2011 12	Alemannia Aachen	3–1	FC Ingolstadt	Aachen
13:30	Olajengbesi 22'; Auer 27'; Odonkor 90'	Report	Buddle 52'	Stadium: New Tivoli; Attendance: 15,622; Referee: Tobias Christ

28 October 2011 13	VfL Bochum	1–0	Alemannia Aachen	Bochum
18:00	Inui 39'	Report		Stadium: Ruhrstadion; Attendance: 14,286; Referee: Christian Bandurski

6 November 2011 14	Alemannia Aachen	2–2	MSV Duisburg	Aachen
13:30	Radu 5'; Bajic 68' o.g.	Report	Domovchiyski 29'; Hoffmann 67'	Stadium: New Tivoli; Attendance: 31,180; Referee: Peter Sippel

20 November 2011 15	Eintracht Frankfurt	4–3	Alemannia Aachen	Frankfurt
13:30	Idrissou 9'; Köhler 12'; Hoffer 81'; Matmour 89'	Report	Auer 78'; Radu 82'; Demai 87'	Stadium: Commerzbank-Arena; Attendance: 38,500; Referee: Harm Osmers

26 November 2011 16	Karlsruher SC	0–2	Alemannia Aachen	Karlsruhe
13:00		Report	Radu 36'; Auer 87'	Stadium: Wildparkstadion; Attendance: 14,000; Referee: Martin Petersen

4 December 2011 17	Alemannia Aachen	2–2	1860 München	Aachen
13:30	Radu 43'; Sibum 81'	Report	Buck 41'; Aigner 76'	Stadium: New Tivoli; Attendance: 17,023; Referee: Frank Willenborg

11 December 2011 18	Alemannia Aachen	1–1	Erzgebirge Aue	Aachen
13:30	Auer 49'	Report	Kempe 64'	Stadium: New Tivoli; Attendance: 14,378; Referee: Bibiana Steinhaus

18 December 2011 19	Eintracht Braunschweig	1–1	Alemannia Aachen	Braunschweig
13:30	Kumbela 86'	Report	Sibum 26'	Stadium: Eintracht-Stadion; Attendance: 19,950; Referee: Christian Leicher

4 February 2012 20	Alemannia Aachen	2–1	FC St. Pauli	Aachen
13:00	Auer 13' pen Demai 15'	Report	Boll 39'	Stadium: New Tivoli; Attendance: 23,000; Referee: Frank Willenborg

10 February 2012 21	FC Energie Cottbus	1–1	Alemannia Aachen	Cottbus
18:00	Möhrle 53'	Report	Feisthammel 50'	Stadium: Stadion der Freundschaft; Attendance: 6,280; Referee: Guido Winkmann

19 February 2012 22	Alemannia Aachen	0–0	FC Hansa Rostock	Aachen
14:10		Report		Stadium: New Tivoli; Attendance: 14,178; Referee: Markus Wingenbach

27 February 2012 23	Fortuna Düsseldorf	0–0	Alemannia Aachen	Düsseldorf
20:30		Report		Stadium: Esprit Arena; Attendance: 28,712; Referee: Deniz Aytekin

3 March 2012 24	Alemannia Aachen	0–3	SC Paderborn 07	Aachen
13:00		Report	Taylor 55', 62'; Alushi 89'	Stadium: New Tivoli; Attendance: 15,071; Referee: Patrick Ittrich

9 March 2012 25	Greuther Fürth	1–0	Alemannia Aachen	Fürth
18:00	Occean 29'	Report		Stadium: Trolli Arena; Attendance: 11,310; Referee: Markus Schmidt

16 March 2012 26	Alemannia Aachen	1–3	1. FC Union Berlin	Aachen
18:00	Achenbach 28'	Report	Ede 23'; Terodde 41'; Zoundi 46'	Stadium: New Tivoli; Attendance: 15,165; Referee: Robert Hartmann

23 March 2012 27	FSV Frankfurt	2–1	Alemannia Aachen	Frankfurt
18:00	Gledson 7'; Görlitz 50'	Report	Auer 22'	Stadium: Frankfurter Volksbank Stadion; Attendance: 4,500; Referee: Peter Gagelmann

30 March 2012 28	Alemannia Aachen	0–1	Dynamo Dresden	Aachen
18:00			Dedič 59'	Stadium: New Tivoli; Attendance: 18,572; Referee: Christian Dingert

8 April 2012 29	FC Ingolstadt 04	3–3	Alemannia Aachen	Ingolstadt
13:30	Stipermann 41' o.g. Leitl 76' pen Schäffler 90'	Report	Stipermann 13', 53'; Olajengbesi 45'	Stadium: Audi Sportpark; Attendance: 6,062; Referee: Christian Fischer

11 April 2012 30	Alemannia Aachen	2–0	VfL Bochum	Aachen
17:30	Odonkor 26'; Streit 39'	Report		Stadium: New Tivoli; Attendance: 17,505; Referee: Deniz Aytekin

14 April 2012 31	MSV Duisburg	2–0	Alemannia Aachen	Duisburg
13:00	Brosinski 74'; Gjasula 83'			Stadium: Schauinsland-Reisen-Arena; Attendance: 15,127; Referee: Wolfgang Stark

23 April 2012 32	Alemannia Aachen	0–3	Eintracht Frankfurt	Aachen
20:15		Report	Idrissou 45', 47'; Olajengbesi 83' o.g.	Stadium: New Tivoli; Attendance: 27,942; Referee: Michael Weiner

29 April 2012 33	Alemannia Aachen	1–0	Karlsruher SC	Aachen
13:30	Demai 20'	Report		Stadium: New Tivoli; Attendance: 21,657; Referee: Peter Sippel

6 May 2012 34	TSV 1860 München	1–2	Alemannia Aachen	München
13:30	Aigner 18'	Report	Streit 10'; Uludağ 21'	Stadium: Allianz Arena; Attendance: 25,100; Referee: Markus Wingenbach

=== League table ===
Pos	Team	Pld	W	D	L	GF	GA	GD	Pts	Promotion, qualification or relegation
14	Energie Cottbus	34	8	11	15	30	49	−19	35	
15	Erzgebirge Aue	34	8	11	15	31	55	−24	35	
16	Karlsruher SC (R)	34	9	6	19	34	60	−26	33	Qualification for relegation play-offs
17	Alemannia Aachen (R)	34	6	13	15	30	47	−17	31	Relegation to 3. Liga
18	Hansa Rostock (R)	34	5	12	17	34	63	−29	27	Relegation to 3. Liga

Source: kicker
Rules for classification: 1) points; 2) goal difference; 3) number of goals scored.
(R) Relegated

== DFB-Pokal ==
31 July 2011 1	Karlsruher SC	3–1	Alemannia Aachen	Karlsruhe
14:30	Milchraum 26'; Kempe 83'; Krebs 90'	Report	Kratz 7'	Stadium: Wildparkstadion; Attendance: 15,118; Referee: Deniz Aytekin
