= 2024–25 Alemannia Aachen season =

Alemannia Aachen
2024–25 season
- Manager: Heiner Backhaus
- Stadium: Tivoli
- 3. Liga: 12th
- Middle Rhine Cup: Final
- Average home league attendance: 25,861

The 2024–25 season is the 124th season in the history of Alemannia Aachen, and the club's first season back in 3. Liga since 2012–13. In addition to the domestic league, the team is scheduled to participate in the Middle Rhine Cup.

== Friendlies ==
=== Pre-season ===
The team held its first pre-season training on June 23 in Alsdorf in a session attended by 1,500 spectators.

28 June 2024 Friendly	Germania Teveren (Germany)	1–3	(Germany) Alemannia Aachen	Geilenkirchen
19:00 UTC+2	Joel Klieber 74'		Sascha Marquet 15'; Leandro Putaro 28', 32'	Stadium: Heidestadion; Attendance: 1,000

6 July 2024 Friendly	Hallescher FC (Germany)	2–1	(Germany) Alemannia Aachen	Halle
14:00				Stadium: Leuna-Chemie-Stadion

12 July 2024 Friendly	Alemannia Aachen (Germany)	0–1	(Germany) VfL Bochum	Aachen
19:00			De Wit 38'	Stadium: Tivoli

13 July 2024 Friendly	Eintracht Trier (Germany)	0–0	(Germany) Alemannia Aachen	Trier
15:00				Stadium: Moselstadion

19 July 2024 Friendly	Teutonia Weiden (Germany)	0–3	(Germany) Alemannia Aachen
19:30		Report

20 July 2024 Friendly	Alemannia Aachen (Germany)	3–0	(Germany) SV Eintracht Hohkeppel
14:30

27 July 2024 Friendly	Roda JC Kerkrade (Netherlands)	2–1	(Germany) Alemannia Aachen
16:30

=== Mid-season ===
7 January 2025 Friendly	Hermannstadt (Romania)	3–0	(Germany) Alemannia Aachen

10 January 2025 Friendly	Altınordu (Turkey)	0–0	(Germany) Alemannia Aachen

== Competitions ==
=== Overall record ===
Competition	First match	Last match	Starting round	Record							
Competition	First match	Last match	Starting round	Pld	W	D	L	GF	GA	GD	Win %
3. Liga	3 August 2024	17 May 2025	Matchday 1	37	12	14	11	43	42	+1	32.43
DFB-Pokal	17 August 2024	17 August 2024	First round	1	0	0	1	2	3	−1	0.00
Middle Rhine Cup	30 October 2024	24 May 2025	Round of 32	4	4	0	0	9	2	+7	100.00
Total				42	16	14	12	54	47	+7	38.10

Last updated: 3 May 2025
Source: Soccerway

=== 3. Liga ===
==== League table ====
Pos	Team	Pld	W	D	L	GF	GA	GD	Pts
10	FC Ingolstadt	38	14	12	12	72	63	+9	54
11	1860 Munich	38	15	8	15	57	61	−4	53
12	Alemannia Aachen	38	12	14	12	44	44	0	50
13	Erzgebirge Aue	38	15	5	18	52	65	−13	50
14	VfL Osnabrück	38	13	9	16	46	55	−9	48

Source: DFB
Rules for classification: 1) Points; 2) Goal difference; 3) Goals scored; 4) Head-to-head results; 5) Head-to-head away goals scored; 6) Away goals scored; 7) Play-off.

==== Matches ====
The match schedule was released on 9 July 2024.

3 August 2024 1	Rot-Weiss Essen	1–2	Alemannia Aachen	Essen
14:00	Vonić 37'	Report	Heinz 28', 74'	Stadium: Stadion an der Hafenstraße; Attendance: 19,200; Referee: Assad Nouhoum

10 August 2024 2	Alemannia Aachen	1–1	SC Verl	Aachen
14:00	Scepanik 52'	Report	Stöcker 45+1'	Stadium: New Tivoli; Attendance: 23,100; Referee: Felix Bickel

24 August 2024 3	Energie Cottbus	2–1	Alemannia Aachen	Cottbus
16:30	Rorig 10'; Borgmann 90+8'	Report	Heinz 52'	Stadium: Stadion der Freundschaft; Attendance: 9,218; Referee: Luca Jürgensen

31 August 2024 4	Alemannia Aachen	1–2	Erzgebirge Aue	Aachen
14:00	El-Faouzi 1'	Report	Bär 58', 84'	Stadium: New Tivoli; Attendance: 23,300; Referee: Cristian Ballweg

15 September 2024 5	Alemannia Aachen	1–0	Viktoria Köln	Aachen
19:30	Strujić 45'	Report		Stadium: New Tivoli; Attendance: 23,800; Referee: Felix Weller

22 September 2024 6	Borussia Dortmund II	3–0	Alemannia Aachen	Dortmund
19:30	Drakas 57'; Hettwer 79'; Campbell 83'	Report		Stadium: Stadion Rote Erde; Attendance: 4,200; Referee: Mario Hildenbrand

25 September 2024 7	Alemannia Aachen	0–0	Waldhof Mannheim	Aachen
19:00		Report		Stadium: New Tivoli; Attendance: 22,800; Referee: Konrad Oldhafer

29 September 2024 8	Dynamo Dresden	0–0	Alemannia Aachen	Dresden
16:30		Report		Stadium: Rudolf-Harbig-Stadion; Attendance: 30,633; Referee: Assad Nouhoum

5 October 2024 9	Alemannia Aachen	1–1	FC Ingolstadt	Aachen
16:30	Bahn 3' (pen.)	Report	Fröde 76'	Stadium: New Tivoli; Attendance: 24,000; Referee: Nico Fuchs

19 October 2024 10	Hansa Rostock	1–2	Alemannia Aachen	Rostock
14:00	Haugen 43'	Report	Strujić 16', 89'	Stadium: Ostseestadion; Attendance: 25,000; Referee: Felix Bickel

23 October 2024 11	Alemannia Aachen	3–1	SpVgg Unterhaching	Aachen
19:00	Benschop 29'; Strujić 71'; Töpken 84'	Report	Jastremski 15'	Stadium: New Tivoli; Attendance: 23,500; Referee: Marc Philip Eckermann

26 October 2024 12	Arminia Bielefeld	1–1	Alemannia Aachen	Bielefeld
14:00	Bördner 3' (o.g.)	Report	Scepanik 53'	Stadium: SchücoArena; Attendance: 21,796; Referee: Richard Hempel

2 November 2024 13	Alemannia Aachen	0–0	Hannover 96 II	Aachen
16:30		Report		Stadium: New Tivoli; Attendance: 23,000; Referee: Jarno Wienefeld

9 November 2024 14	SV Sandhausen	4–0	Alemannia Aachen	Sandhausen
14:00	Wolf 39'; Otto 62'; Feher 64'; Baumann 85'	Report		Stadium: Hardtwaldstadion; Attendance: 4,309; Referee: Lukas Benen

23 November 2024 15	Alemannia Aachen	1–1	1860 Munich	Aachen
14:00	Bahn 11' (pen.)	Report	Hobsch 87'	Stadium: New Tivoli; Attendance: 31,579; Referee: Martin Wilke

1 December 2024 16	VfL Osnabrück	1–1	Alemannia Aachen	Osnabrück
13:30	Wiemann 20'	Report	Strujić 30'	Stadium: Stadion an der Bremer Brücke; Attendance: 15,321; Referee: Felix Weller

7 December 2024 17	Alemannia Aachen	2–1	VfB Stuttgart II	Aachen
16:30	Bahn 57' (pen.); Bakhat 80'	Report	Bujupi 8'	Stadium: New Tivoli; Attendance: 21,100; Referee: Leonidas Exuzidis

15 December 2024 18	1. FC Saarbrücken	1–1	Alemannia Aachen	Saarbrücken
19:30	Neudecker 74' (pen.)	Report	El-Faouzi 41'	Stadium: Ludwigsparkstadion; Attendance: 13,655; Referee: Timon Schulz

21 December 2024 19	Alemannia Aachen	0–0	Wehen Wiesbaden	Aachen
16:30		Report		Stadium: New Tivoli; Attendance: 23,600; Referee: Martin Speckner

19 January 2025 20	Alemannia Aachen	2–0	Rot-Weiss Essen	Aachen
16:30	Bakhat 57'; Heinz 85'	Report		Stadium: New Tivoli; Attendance: 31,580; Referee: Felix Wagner

25 January 2025 21	SC Verl	2–1	Alemannia Aachen	Verl
14:00	Kijewski 55', 74'	Report	El-Faouzi 84'	Stadium: Sportclub Arena; Attendance: 3,321; Referee: Kevin Behrens

31 January 2025 22	Alemannia Aachen	0–0	Energie Cottbus	Aachen
19:00		Report		Stadium: New Tivoli; Attendance: 24,500; Referee: Felix Bickel

8 February 2025 23	Erzgebirge Aue	1–1	Alemannia Aachen	Aue
14:00	Clausen 89'	Report	Beleme 10'	Stadium: Erzgebirgsstadion; Attendance: 7,201; Referee: Konrad Oldhafer

14 February 2025 24	Viktoria Köln	3–1	Alemannia Aachen	Cologne
19:00	S. El Mala 45+3'; Lobinger 59'; M. El Mala 83'	Report	Goden 40'	Stadium: Sportpark Höhenberg; Attendance: 8,023; Referee: Leonidas Exuzidis

22 February 2025 25	Alemannia Aachen	2–2	Borussia Dortmund II	Aachen
14:00	Bahn 36'; Bakhat 53'	Report	Azhil 72'; Foti 86'	Stadium: New Tivoli; Attendance: 23,300; Referee: Felix Grund

2 March 2025 26	Waldhof Mannheim	2–1	Alemannia Aachen	Mannheim
13:30	Becker 18'; Rieckmann 68'	Report	Strujić 75'	Stadium: Carl-Benz-Stadion; Attendance: 12,290; Referee: Assad Nouhoum

8 March 2025 27	Alemannia Aachen	0–1	Dynamo Dresden	Aachen
14:00		Report	Hauptmann 45+2'	Stadium: New Tivoli; Attendance: 30,700; Referee: Tobias Wittmann

11 March 2025 28	FC Ingolstadt	0–3	Alemannia Aachen	Ingolstadt
19:00		Report	Heinz 29'; Wiebe 50'; Strujić 77'	Stadium: Audi Sportpark; Attendance: 3,810; Referee: Konrad Oldhafer

16 March 2025 29	Alemannia Aachen	2–1	Hansa Rostock	Aachen
19:30	Castelle 62'; Bahn 83'	Report	Harenbrock 74'	Stadium: New Tivoli; Attendance: 27,200; Referee: Mario Hildenbrand

29 March 2025 30	SpVgg Unterhaching	0–2	Alemannia Aachen	Unterhaching
14:00		Report	Scepanik 40'; Gaudino 62'	Stadium: Sportpark Unterhaching; Attendance: 4,125; Referee: Daniel Bartnitzki

5 April 2025 31	Alemannia Aachen	0–1	Arminia Bielefeld	Aachen
16:30		Report	Biankadi 56'	Stadium: New Tivoli; Attendance: 31,400; Referee: Timo Gansloweit

8 April 2025 32	Hannover 96 II	1–1	Alemannia Aachen	Hannover
19:00	Uhlmann 76' (pen.)	Report	Benschop 51'	Stadium: Heinz von Heiden Arena; Attendance: 2,808; Referee: Michael Näther

12 April 2025 33	Alemannia Aachen	2–1	SV Sandhausen	Aachen
16:30	Simnica 3' (o.g.); Yarbrough 45+1'	Report	Baumann 20'	Stadium: New Tivoli; Attendance: 25,912; Referee: Felix Prigan

19 April 2025 34	1860 Munich	2–1	Alemannia Aachen	Munich
14:00	Abiama 39'; Philipp 89'	Report	Bakhat 49'	Stadium: Grünwalder Stadion; Attendance: 15,000; Referee: Leonidas Exuzidis

27 April 2025 35	Alemannia Aachen	1–0	VfL Osnabrück	Aachen
16:30	Hanraths 30'	Report		Stadium: New Tivoli; Attendance: 28,745; Referee: Jarno Wienefeld

3 May 2025 36	VfB Stuttgart II	2–1	Alemannia Aachen	Aspach
14:00	Kastanaras 6'; Nartey 27'	Report	Hanraths 50' (pen.)	Stadium: WIRmachenDRUCK Arena; Attendance: 2,300; Referee: Felix Grund

10 May 2025 37	Alemannia Aachen	4–2	1. FC Saarbrücken	Aachen
14:00	Wiebe 33'; Gaudino 52'; Bahn 69' (pen.); Heinz 85'	Report	Krüger 75'; Rabihic 90+4'	Stadium: New Tivoli; Attendance: 28,000; Referee: Cristian Ballweg

17 May 2025 38	Wehen Wiesbaden	v	Alemannia Aachen	Wiesbaden
13:30				Stadium: BRITA-Arena

=== DFB-Pokal ===
17 August 2024 First round	Alemannia Aachen	2–3	Holstein Kiel	Aachen
18:00	Hanraths 28'; Benschop 60'	Report	Machino 16'; Rosenboom 82', 90+1'	Stadium: New Tivoli; Attendance: 29,555; Referee: Michael Bacher

=== Middle Rhine Cup ===
30 October 2024 Round of 32	Horremer SV	0–1	Alemannia Aachen	Aachen
19:00		Report	Dervisevic 55'	Stadium: New Tivoli; Attendance: 5,100; Referee: Lutz Meyersieck

11 December 2024 Round of 16	TV Hoffnungsthal	1–4 (a.e.t.)	Alemannia Aachen	Bergisch Gladbach
19:00	Aytekin Kanli 12'	Report	Hansen 88' (o.g.); Heinz 101', 105'; Goden 114'	Stadium: Belkaw Arena; Attendance: 2,000; Referee: Sven Landgraf

5 March 2025 Quarter-final	1. FC Düren	1–3	Alemannia Aachen	Düren
19:00	Lela 14'	Report	Lela 65' (o.g.); Strujić 90+1'; Heinz 90+6'	Stadium: Westkampfbahn; Attendance: 2,500

16 April 2025 Semi-final	Fortuna Köln	0–1 (a.e.t.)	Alemannia Aachen	Cologne
19:00		Report	Benschop 98'	Stadium: Südstadion; Attendance: 9,448; Referee: Tobias Esch

24 May 2025 Final	Alemannia Aachen	v	Viktoria Köln	Cologne
16:30		Report		Stadium: Sportpark Höhenberg
