= Dustin Willms =

German footballer

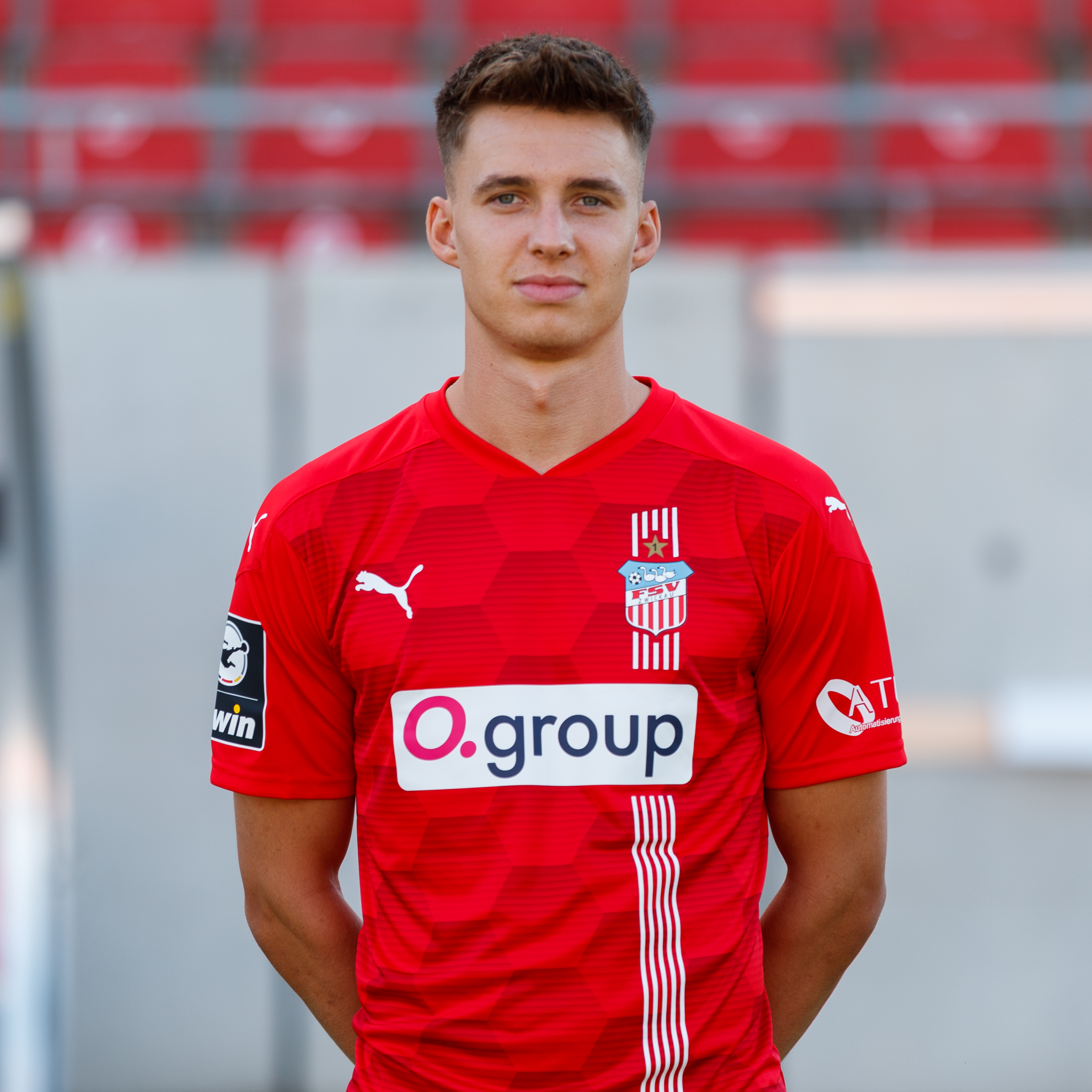
- Willms with FSV Zwickau in July 2021

Personal information
- Date of birth: 30 June 1999 (age 27)
- Place of birth: Werne, Germany
- Height: 1.86 m (6 ft 1 in)
- Position: Centre-forward

Team information
- Current team: Sportfreunde Siegen
- Number: 30

Youth career
- 2003–2012: SV Südkirchen
- 2012–2014: VfB Waltrop
- 2014–2017: Schalke 04
- 2017–2018: Fortuna Düsseldorf

Senior career*
Years	Team	Apps	(Gls)
2018–2020	Fortuna Düsseldorf II	38	(5)
2020–2022	FSV Zwickau	42	(2)
2022–2023	Fortuna Köln	26	(10)
2023–2024	Alemannia Aachen	24	(4)
2024–2025	MSV Duisburg	9	(2)
2025–	Sportfreunde Siegen	39	(14)
- * Club domestic league appearances and goals as of 23 September 2026

Dustin Willms (born 30 June 1999) is a German footballer who plays as a centre-forward for Sportfreunde Siegen.

== Career ==
Willms was born in Werne.

Having played youth football with SV Südkirchen, VfB Waltrop, Schalke 04 and Fortuna Düsseldorf and senior football with Fortuna Düsseldorf II, he signed for 3. Liga club FSV Zwickau in July 2020. In January 2025, he moved to MSV Duisburg. He left Duisburg after the 2024–25 season and joined Sportfreunde Siegen.

== Career statistics ==
As of match played 17 May 2025

Appearances and goals by club, season and competition
Club	Season	League			DFB-Pokal		Total	
Club	Season	Division	Apps	Goals	Apps	Goals	Apps	Goals
Fortuna Düsseldorf II	2018–19	Regionalliga West	19	1	—		19	1
Fortuna Düsseldorf II	2019–20	Regionalliga West	19	4	—		19	4
Fortuna Düsseldorf II	Total		38	5	0	0	38	5
FSV Zwickau	2020–21	3. Liga	28	2	—		28	2
FSV Zwickau	2021–22	3. Liga	14	0	—		14	0
FSV Zwickau	Total		42	2	0	0	42	2
Fortuna Köln	2022–23	Regionalliga West	26	10	—		26	10
Alemannia Aachen	2023–24	Regionalliga West	24	4	—		24	4
Alemannia Aachen	2024–25	3. Liga	0	0	—		0	0
Alemannia Aachen	Total		24	4	0	0	24	4
MSV Duisburg	2024–25	Regionalliga West	9	2	—		9	2
Career total			139	23	0	0	139	23
