= Armand Drevina =

German-Kosovar footballer

Personal information
- Date of birth: 3 February 1994 (age 32)
- Place of birth: Heinsberg, Germany
- Height: 1.72 m (5 ft 8 in)
- Position: Midfielder

Youth career
- –2008: Oberbrucher BC 09
- 2008–2013: Alemannia Aachen

Senior career*
Years	Team	Apps	(Gls)
2012–2014	Alemannia Aachen	39	(0)
2013–2014	Alemannia Aachen II	7	(1)
2014–2016	KFC Uerdingen	38	(3)
2016–2020	FC Wegberg-Beeck	78	(21)
2020–2023	Borussia Freialdenhoven	59	(2)
- * Club domestic league appearances and goals as of 20:04, 20 November 2023 (UTC)

Armand Drevina (born 3 February 1994) is a German-Kosovar footballer who plays as a midfielder.

== Career ==
Drevina made his professional debut for Alemannia Aachen in the 3. Liga on 17 November 2012, coming on as a substitute in the 85th minute for Robert Leipertz in a 2–1 away loss against VfB Stuttgart II.
