= Robert Wilschrey =

German footballer

Personal information
- Date of birth: 27 June 1989 (age 37)
- Place of birth: Neuss, West Germany
- Height: 1.76 m (5 ft 9 in)
- Position: Midfielder

Team information
- Current team: SC Kapellen-Erft
- Number: 10

Youth career
- Holzheimer SG
- DJK VfL Willich
- Union Nettetal
- –2008: 1. FC Köln

Senior career*
Years	Team	Apps	(Gls)
2008–2013	Alemannia Aachen II	97	(4)
2012–2013	Alemannia Aachen	17	(0)
2013–	SC Kapellen-Erft	168	(24)
- * Club domestic league appearances and goals as of 05:58, 13 December 2018 (UTC)

Robert Wilschrey (born 27 June 1989) is a German footballer who plays as a midfielder for SC Kapellen-Erft.

== Career ==
Wilschrey made his professional debut for Alemannia Aachen in the 3. Liga on 10 November 2012, coming on as a substitute in the 28th minute for Christian Weber in the 0–3 home loss against Hallescher FC.
