= Dario Schumacher =

German footballer (born 1993)

Personal information
- Date of birth: 1 April 1993 (age 33)
- Place of birth: Grevenbroich, Germany
- Height: 1.84 m (6 ft 0 in)
- Position: Midfielder

Team information
- Current team: Sportfreunde Niederwenigern

Youth career
- –2007: Bedburger BV
- 2007–2012: Alemannia Aachen

Senior career*
Years	Team	Apps	(Gls)
2012–2013	Alemannia Aachen II	16	(3)
2012–2013	Alemannia Aachen	10	(2)
2013–2016	Schalke 04 II	71	(6)
2016–2018	Bonner SC	66	(21)
2018–2019	Rot-Weiß Oberhausen	28	(1)
2019–2021	Bonner SC	55	(9)
2021–2023	1. FC Bocholt	46	(4)
2023–2024	TVD Velbert	32	(8)
2024–	Sportfreunde Niederwenigern	0	(0)
- * Club domestic league appearances and goals as of 2 June 2024

Dario Schumacher (born 1 April 1993) is a German footballer who plays for Oberliga Niederrhein club Sportfreunde Niederwenigern.

== Club ==
Club performance			League		Cup		Continental		Other		Total	
Club	League	Season	App.	Goals	App.	Goals	App.	Goals	App.	Goals	App.	Goals
Germany			League		DFB-Pokal		Europe		Other		Total	
Alemannia Aachen II	NRW-Liga	2011–12	1	0	0	0	0	0	0	0	1	0
Alemannia Aachen II	Oberliga Mittelrhein	2012–13	15	3	0	0	0	0	0	0	15	3
Alemannia Aachen	3. Liga	2012–13	10	2	0	0	0	0	0	0	10	2
FC Schalke 04 II	Regionalliga West	2013–14	24	2	0	0	0	0	0	0	24	2
FC Schalke 04 II	Regionalliga West	2014–15	20	4	0	0	0	0	0	0	20	4
FC Schalke 04 II	Regionalliga West	2015–16	7	0	0	0	0	0	0	0	7	0
Total			77	11	0	0	0	0	0	0	77	11
Last updated: 25 October 2015
