= Anouar Hadouir =

Dutch footballer

Personal information
- Full name: Anouar Hadouir
- Date of birth: 14 September 1982 (age 44)
- Place of birth: 's-Hertogenbosch, Netherlands
- Height: 1.73 m (5 ft 8 in)
- Position: Winger

Senior career*
Years	Team	Apps	(Gls)
2002–2007	Willem II	99	(18)
2007–2011	Roda JC	112	(18)
2011–2012	Alemannia Aachen	11	(0)
2012–2014	NAC	38	(3)
2014–2016	Moghreb Tétouan		
2016–2019	Excelsior	55	(2)
2019–2022	CHC Den Bosch		
Total		315	(41)
- * Club domestic league appearances and goals as of 22 June 2019

Anouar Hadouir (born 14 September 1982) is a Dutch retired footballer who works at the FC Den Bosch academy.

== Career ==
Hadouir was born in 's-Hertogenbosch and made his debut in professional football, being part of the Willem II squad in the 2002–03 season. In 2007, Hadouir signed with Roda JC where he stayed four seasons. In July 2011, Alemannia Aachen of the German 2. Bundesliga signed Hadouir on a two-year contract. On 6 July 2012, he joined NAC Breda on a free transfer.

In 2014, he moved to Morocco to play for Moghreb Tétouan. He returned to the Eredivisie in July 2016, signing with Excelsior.

Ahead of the 2019/20 season, Hadouir joined SV CHC Den Bosch where his two brothers, Younes and Mounir, also was playing.

After retiring as a player he worked as a coach at the Willem II academy and joined RKC in the same position. He was dismissed by the club in February 2024.

== Personal life ==
Born in the Netherlands, Hadouir is of Moroccan descent.

== Career statistics ==
As of 31 January 2018

Appearances and goals by club, season and competition
Club	Season	League			Cup		Other		Total	
Club	Season	Division	Apps	Goals	Apps	Goals	Apps	Goals	Apps	Goals
Willem II	2002–03	Eredivisie	3	0	0	0	0	0	3	0
Willem II	2003–04	Eredivisie	32	5	0	0	0	0	32	5
Willem II	2004–05	Eredivisie	14	2	0	0	0	0	14	2
Willem II	2005–06	Eredivisie	24	5	0	0	0	0	24	5
Willem II	2006–07	Eredivisie	24	5	0	0	0	0	24	5
Willem II	2007–08	Eredivisie	2	1	0	0	0	0	2	1
Willem II	Total		99	18	0	0	0	0	99	18
Roda JC	2007–08	Eredivisie	30	5	0	0	0	0	30	5
Roda JC	2008–09	Eredivisie	26	4	2	0	5 (Note: Appearances in Relegation play-offs)	1	33	5
Roda JC	2009–10	Eredivisie	31	3	1	0	0	0	32	3
Roda JC	2010–11	Eredivisie	29	6	3	0	0	0	32	6
Roda JC	Total		116	18	6	0	5	1	127	19
Alemannia Aachen	2011–12	2. Bundesliga	11	0	1	0	0	0	12	0
NAC Breda	2012–13	Eredivisie	21	1	2	0	0	0	23	1
NAC Breda	2013–14	Eredivisie	17	2	2	1	0	0	19	3
NAC Breda	Total		38	3	4	1	0	0	42	4
Excelsior	2016–17	Eredivisie	21	1	1	0	0	0	22	1
Excelsior	2017–18	Eredivisie	13	1	0	0	0	0	13	1
Excelsior	Total		34	2	1	0	0	0	35	2
Career totals			298	41	12	1	5	1	289	43
