= Kai Schwertfeger =

German professional footballer (born 1988)

Personal information
- Date of birth: 8 September 1988 (age 38)
- Place of birth: Düsseldorf, West Germany
- Height: 1.88 m (6 ft 2 in)
- Position: Defensive midfielder

Youth career
- 1994–1997: Mettmanner SC
- 1997–2007: Fortuna Düsseldorf

Senior career*
Years	Team	Apps	(Gls)
2007–2009	Fortuna Düsseldorf II	85	(5)
2007–2012	Fortuna Düsseldorf	58	(0)
2012–2013	Alemannia Aachen	20	(2)
2013–2014	Karlsruher SC	20	(0)
2014–2016	Hansa Rostock	32	(2)
2016–2017	Wuppertaler SV	19	(2)
2017–2019	KFC Uerdingen 05	26	(1)
2019	SV Straelen	11	(0)
2019–2021	SSVg Velbert	30	(2)
2021–2022	TVD Velbert	5	(0)
Total		306	(14)
- * Club domestic league appearances and goals

Kai Schwertfeger (born 8 September 1988) is a German former professional footballer who played as a defensive midfielder.

== Career ==
Schwertfeger began his career with the youth team of Mettmanner SC and signed a youth contract in summer 1997 for Fortuna Düsseldorf. He made his professional debut for Fortuna Düsseldorf on 13 May 2008 in the Regionalliga Nord against VfL Wolfsburg II.
