= Anton Heinz =

German footballer (born 1998)

Personal information
- Date of birth: 7 January 1998 (age 28)
- Place of birth: Gütersloh, Germany
- Height: 1.87 m (6 ft 2 in)
- Positions: Forward; winger

Team information
- Current team: Bayern Munich II

Youth career
- –2015: Arminia Bielefeld
- 2015–2017: SC Verl

Senior career*
Years	Team	Apps	(Gls)
2018–2020	SC Verl	23	(4)
2020–2021	SV Lippstadt 08	37	(1)
2021–2023	Rot-Weiß Oberhausen	69	(30)
2023–2025	Alemannia Aachen	66	(26)
2025–	Bayern Munich II	47	(27)
- * Club domestic league appearances and goals as of 7 November 2026

Anton Heinz (born 7 January 1998) is a German professional footballer who plays as a forward and winger for Regionalliga Bayern club Bayern Munich II.

== Club career ==
Heinz is a youth product of Arminia Bielefeld, he then moved to SC Verl, with whom he made his professional debut in 2018, and later joined SV Lippstadt 08 on 15 July 2020.

On 1 July 2021, he joined Rot-Weiß Oberhausen.

Heinz joined Alemannia Aachen on 1 July 2023. During his first season he became the Regionalliga West top goalscorer, as he scored 20 goals and helped the club to win the league and achieve promotion to the 3. Liga for the 2024–25 season.

He joined Regionalliga Bayern team Bayern Munich II on 1 July 2025.
