= Freddy Borg =

Swedish footballer

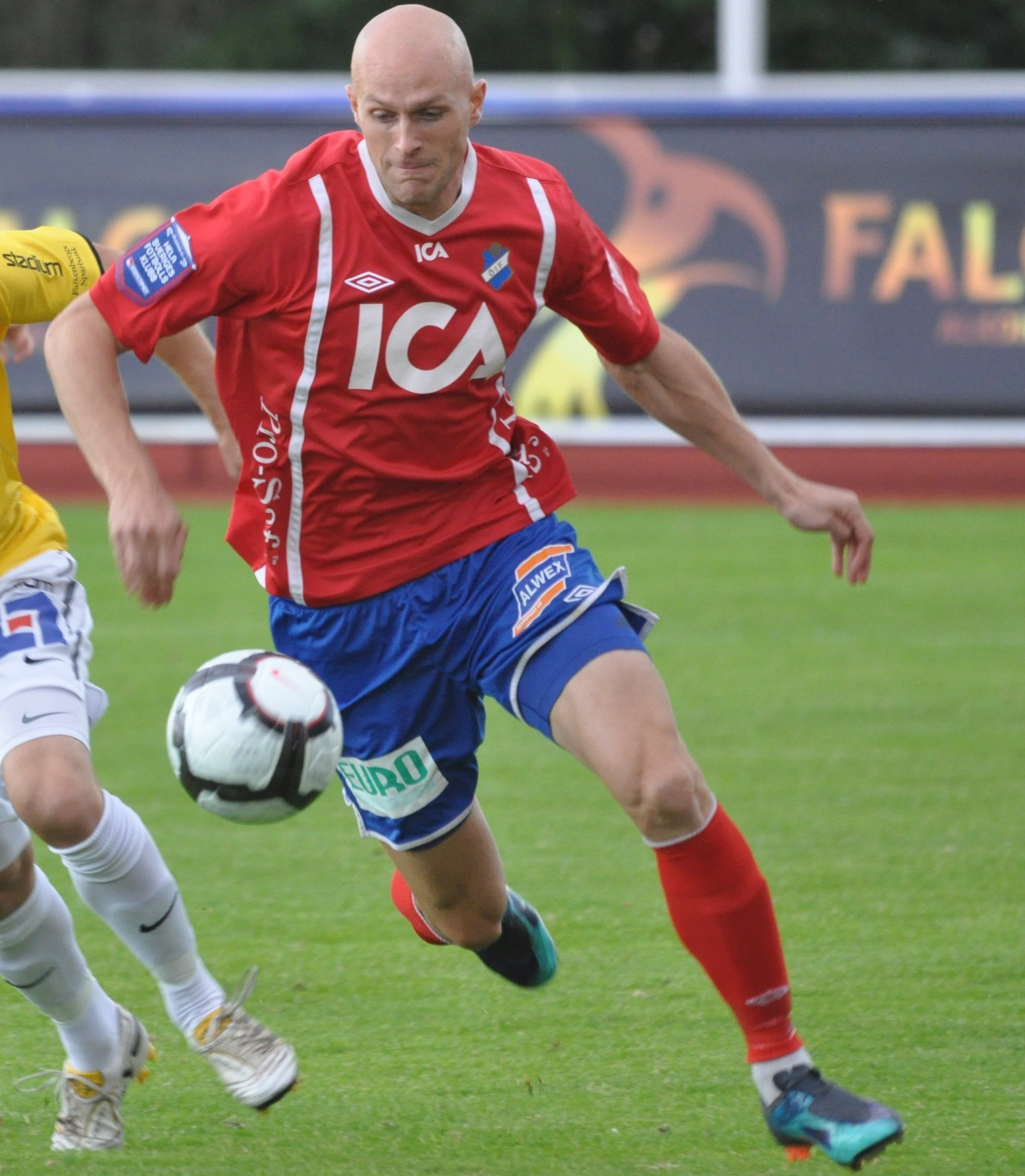
- Borg playing for Östers IF in 2010

Personal information
- Full name: Freddy Jan Robert Borg
- Date of birth: 27 November 1983 (age 42)
- Place of birth: Trelleborg, Sweden
- Height: 1.85 m (6 ft 1 in)
- Position: Forward

Youth career
- Trelleborgs FF

Senior career*
Years	Team	Apps	(Gls)
2002	Malmö FF	0	(0)
2003–2004	Höllvikens GIF		
2005–2011	Östers IF	139	(28)
2012	Hansa Rostock	14	(5)
2012–2013	Alemannia Aachen	14	(1)
2013	SV Darmstadt 98	14	(0)
2013	AZAL	6	(0)
2014	Trelleborgs FF	8	(2)
2014	Nybergsund IL-Trysil	5	(3)
2015–2016	FC Höllviken	46	(11)
- * Club domestic league appearances and goals

Freddy Jan Robert Borg (born 27 November 1983) is a Swedish former professional footballer who played as a forward.

== Career ==
=== Sweden ===
Borg started his career with Trelleborgs FF as a youth player, before moving to Malmö FF, Höllvikens GIF and then Östers IF, where he spent seven years.

=== Germany ===
On 22 January 2012, Borg signed a six-month contract with Hansa Rostock of the German 2. Bundesliga. Borg scored five times in 14 appearances for the club during his stay. June 2012 saw Borg sign for Alemannia Aachen in the 3. Liga. After six months with Alemannia Aachen, Borg signed a six-month contract with SV Darmstadt 98, also of the 3. Liga, in January 2013.

=== Azerbaijan ===
In July 2013, Borg signed for Azerbaijan Premier League side AZAL. Borg made his debut on 10 August 2013, coming on as a 65th-minute substitute for Garib Ibrahimov, in their 1–0 victory over Baku. In December 2013, the start of the winter break in the Azerbaijan season, Borg was released from his contract with AZAL having made just six substitute appearances whilst failing to score.

=== Return to Sweden ===
Following his short stint in Azerbaijan, Borg signed for his hometown team Trelleborgs FF on a short-term contract till the summer of 2014, with an option of extending till the end of the season, in March 2014.

== Career statistics ==
As of 6 May 2014

Appearances and goals by club, season and competition
Club	Season	League			Cup		Total	
Club	Season	Division	Apps	Goals	Apps	Goals	Apps	Goals
Östers IF	2005	Superettan	16	4			16	4
Östers IF	2006	Allsvenskan	18	1			18	1
Östers IF	2007	Superettan	24	1			24	1
Östers IF	2008	Division 1	12	4			12	4
Östers IF	2009	Division 1	15	3			15	3
Östers IF	2010	Superettan	29	7	2	1	31	8
Östers IF	2011	Superettan	25	8	2	1	27	9
Östers IF	Total		139	28	4	2	143	30
Hansa Rostock	2011–12	2. Bundesliga	14	5	—		14	5
Alemannia Aachen	2012–13	3. Liga	14	1	1	0	15	1
Darmstadt 98	2012–13	3. Liga	14	0	0	0	14	0
Ravan Baku	2013–14	Azerbaijan Premier League	6	0	0	0	6	0
Trelleborg	2014	Division 1	3	1	0	0	3	1
Career total			184	35	5	2	189	37
