= Tim Krumpen =

German footballer (born 1988)

Personal information
- Date of birth: November 28, 1988 (age 37)
- Place of birth: Aachen, West Germany
- Position: Goalkeeper

Youth career
- FC Düren-Niederau 08
- FC Germania Vossenack
- –2007: Alemannia Aachen

Senior career*
Years	Team	Apps	(Gls)
2007–2010	Alemannia Aachen II	55	(0)
2010–2013	Alemannia Aachen	18	(0)
- * Club domestic league appearances and goals

Tim Krumpen (born November 28, 1988) is a German retired footballer who played as a goalkeeper.

He made his debut for the club in May 2011, as a substitute for Sergiu Radu in a 2. Bundesliga match against Fortuna Düsseldorf, after David Hohs had been sent off. Krumpen announced his retirement from football in summer 2013.
