= Bas Sibum =

Dutch football manager (born 1982)

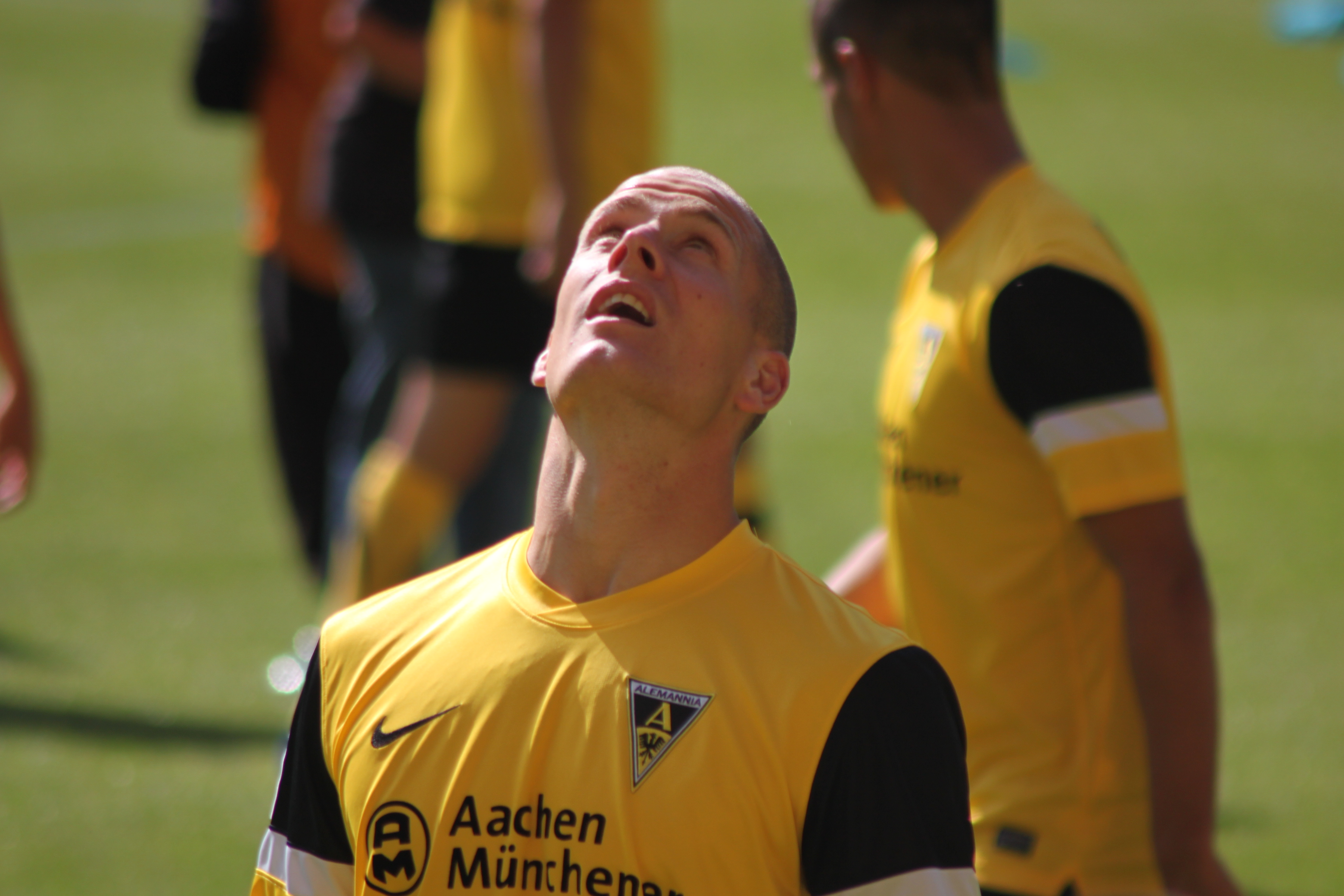
- Sibum with Alemannia Aachen in 2011

Personal information
- Full name: Bas Sibum
- Date of birth: 26 December 1982 (age 43)
- Place of birth: Nieuw-Amsterdam, Netherlands
- Height: 1.80 m (5 ft 11 in)
- Position: Defensive midfielder

Team information
- Current team: PSV (assistant)

Youth career
- SV Twedo
- Emmen

Senior career*
Years	Team	Apps	(Gls)
2000–2003	Emmen	54	(5)
2003–2007	Twente	87	(0)
2007–2008	Roda JC	20	(1)
2008–2011	NEC	90	(7)
2011–2012	Alemannia Aachen	30	(2)
2012–2014	Waasland-Beveren	63	(0)
2014–2016	Heracles Almelo	8	(0)
Total		352	(15)

Managerial career
- 2017–2020: Emmen (youth)
- 2019–2023: Emmen (assistant)
- 2023–2025: Roda JC
- 2025: Heracles Almelo
- 2026–: PSV (assistant)
- * Club domestic league appearances and goals

Bas Sibum (born 26 December 1982) is a Dutch professional football manager and former player.

Sibum began his playing career at Emmen before playing for clubs including Twente, Roda JC, NEC, Alemannia Aachen, and Waasland-Beveren. After retiring in 2016, he transitioned into coaching, starting with Emmen's youth teams. In May 2023, he was appointed head coach of Roda JC, leading them to a strong season and earning the Eerste Divisie Manager of the Season award in 2024. He joined Eredivisie club Heracles Almelo in 2025.

== Playing career ==
Sibum began playing football at SV Twedo in his hometown Nieuw-Amsterdam, Drenthe. He was scouted by the local professional club, Emmen, where he made his professional debut in the second-tier Eerste Divisie in the 2000–01 season. On 7 April 2001, he replaced Alami Ahannach in the 73rd minute of a 2–0 league loss to Heracles Almelo to make his professional debut. In his third and final year with the second division club, he was a regular starter, making 33 appearances and scoring five goals. At the end of the season, Emmen finished second in the table but failed to secure promotion in the play-offs.

Sibum joined Eredivisie club Twente in 2003. Sibum quickly secured a spot in the starting lineup under coach René Vandereycken, playing alongside Peter Niemeyer, Giorgi Gakhokidze, and Simon Cziommer. Over three seasons, he made 87 appearances for the Tukkers. However, under coach Fred Rutten, who preferred a midfield trio of Orlando Engelaar, Otman Bakkal, and Karim El Ahmadi, Sibum found himself relegated to a backup role. Consequently, during the winter break, both Niemeyer and Sibum left the club; Niemeyer joined Werder Bremen, while Sibum transferred to Roda JC.

In his year at Roda JC, Sibum struggled to secure a regular spot in Raymond Atteveld's team, but he did score his first ever Eredivisie goal on 10 February 2007, in a 1–0 win against NEC.

In January 2008, he signed a three-and-a-half-year contract with NEC. He quickly became a regular starter and a fan favourite. Under manager Mario Been, he demonstrated his abilities on an international stage in the UEFA Cup, playing in seven matches. However, NEC's campaign ended in the third round with 3–0 and 1–0 losses against Hamburger SV. In the 2009–10 season, a hip injury set him back, but he returned to the team during the winter break. Despite his efforts, NEC finished in the lower half of the table again in the 2010–11 season, following 11th and 13th place finishes in the previous seasons.

He played in Nijmegen for three-and-a-half seasons before departing for German club Alemannia Aachen in the summer of 2011. In his only season at the club, Aachen suffered relegation from the 2. Bundesliga. In 2012, he signed a one-year contract with Belgian club Waasland-Beveren, with an option for an additional year.

On 3 June 2014, Heracles Almelo announced that Sibum had signed a two-year contract with the club, with an option for an additional season. In his first year, he made eight league appearances, but none in the second year. After the 2015–16 season, Sibum retired from professional football. He then played for MVV Alcides in the Eerste Klasse but retired from football altogether in February 2017 due to chronic injuries.

== Managerial career ==
=== Youth and assistant coaching ===
Sibum started coaching Emmen's youth in February 2017, where he was appointed coach of the under-19 team. He was since promoted to assistant coach of the first team.

=== Roda JC ===
On 9 May 2023, Eerste Divisie club Roda JC announced Sibum as their new head coach, replacing Edwin de Graaf. The move marked a return to the club, where he played between 2007 and 2008.

Under his leadership, the team experienced a significant turnaround in results, propelling them into contention for promotion. On 3 May 2024, Roda JC fans prematurely celebrated their team's promotion to the Eredivisie after a 2–0 victory over Cambuur, believing they had secured a top-two finish. However, a 95th-minute equalizer by their direct rivals, Groningen, against Telstar denied Roda's promotion, extending the race to the final matchday. The stadium announcer had mistakenly announced their promotion due to a poor internet connection, leading Roda's supporters to invade the pitch at Parkstad Limburg Stadion. The premature pitch invasion made international news. On the final matchday, Roda lost a direct matchup to Groningen, meaning they had to compete in the playoffs for promotion. In the first round of the playoffs, Roda lost 8–1 on aggregate to NAC Breda, extending their stay in the second tier. As a result of Roda's successful season, Sibum was named manager of the season in the Eerste Divisie on 15 May 2024.

=== Heracles Almelo ===
On 2 April 2025, Sibum was appointed head coach of Eredivisie club Heracles Almelo on a three-year contract, effective from the start of the 2025–26 season. The role marked a return to the club where he had played between 2014 and 2016. He succeeded Erwin van de Looi, who opted not to renew his contract.

Heracles made a dismal start to the season under Sibum, losing their opening six matches before a 3–0 home win over Sparta Rotterdam on 27 September 2025 provided their first victory. Following a 3–0 defeat at Volendam on 25 October, which left the club bottom of the Eredivisie with three points from ten matches, Heracles dismissed Sibum with immediate effect the following day. Supervisory Board Chairman Hans Morsink cited the lack of improvement as the decisive factor, and technical director Nico-Jan Hoogma resigned on the same day.

== Playing statistics ==
Appearances and goals by club, season and competition
Club	Season	League			National Cup		Europe		Other		Total	
Club	Season	Division	Apps	Goals	Apps	Goals	Apps	Goals	Apps	Goals	Apps	Goals
Emmen	2000–01	Eerste Divisie	8	0	—		—		—		8	0
Emmen	2001–02	Eerste Divisie	13	0	0	0	—				13	0
Emmen	2002–03	Eerste Divisie	33	5	1	1	—				34	6
Emmen	Total		54	5	1	1	—				54	6
Twente	2003–04	Eredivisie	28	0	4	2	—		—		32	2
Twente	2004–05	Eredivisie	22	0	3	1	—		—		25	1
Twente	2005–06	Eredivisie	24	0	3	0	—		6 (Note: Appearances in Eredivisie play-offs)	2	33	2
Twente	2006–07	Eredivisie	13	0	1	0	—		—		14	1
Twente	Total		87	0	11	3	—		6	2	104	5
Roda JC	2006–07	Eredivisie	13	1	2	0	—		2	0	17	1
Roda JC	2007–08	Eredivisie	7	0	2	0	—		—		9	0
Roda JC	Total		20	0	4	0	—		2	0	26	0
NEC	2007–08	Eredivisie	14	1	—		—		6	0	20	1
NEC	2008–09	Eredivisie	31	2	2	0	7 (Note: Appearances in UEFA Cup)	0	—		40	2
NEC	2009–10	Eredivisie	15	1	2	0	—		—		17	1
NEC	2010–11	Eredivisie	30	3	1	0	—		—		31	3
NEC	Total		90	7	5	0	7	0	6	0	108	7
Alemannia Aachen	2011–12	2. Bundesliga	30	2	1	0	—		—		31	2
Waasland-Beveren	2012–13	Belgian Pro League	35	0	1	0	—		—		36	0
Waasland-Beveren	2013–14	Belgian Pro League	28	0	0	0	—		—		28	0
Waasland-Beveren	Total		63	0	1	0	—		—		64	0
Heracles Almelo	2014–15	Eredivisie	8	0	2	0	—		—		10	0
Career total			352	15	25	4	7	0	14	2	398	21

== Managerial statistics ==
As of match played 25 October 2025

Managerial record by team and tenure
Team	From	To	Record				
Team	From	To	P	W	D	L	Win %
Roda JC	9 May 2023	30 June 2025	80	34	22	24	42.50
Heracles Almelo	1 July 2025	26 October 2025	9	1	0	8	11.11
Total			89	35	22	32	39.33

== Honours ==
=== Manager ===
Individual

- Eerste Divisie Manager of the Season: 2023–24
