= Michael Melka =

German footballer

Personal information
- Date of birth: 9 July 1978 (age 48)
- Place of birth: Castrop-Rauxel, West Germany
- Height: 1.95 m (6 ft 5 in)
- Position: Goalkeeper

Youth career
- –1996: Borussia Dortmund
- 1996–1997: Hasper SV
- 1997–1998: Hammer SpVg
- 1998–1999: FC Remscheid

Senior career*
Years	Team	Apps	(Gls)
1999–2001	SC Preußen Münster	29	(0)
2001–2007	Borussia Mönchengladbach II	52	(0)
2001–2007	Borussia Mönchengladbach	8	(0)
2007–2011	Fortuna Düsseldorf	88	(0)
2011–2012	Rot-Weiß Oberhausen	30	(0)
2012–2013	Alemannia Aachen	9	(0)
Total		216	(0)
- * Club domestic league appearances and goals

Michael Melka (born 9 July 1978 in Castrop-Rauxel, North Rhine-Westphalia) is a German football player who last played for Alemannia Aachen.

== Career statistics ==
Appearances and goals by club, season and competition
Club	Season	League			National cup		Total	
Club	Season	Division	Apps	Goals	Apps	Goals	Apps	Goals
SC Preußen Münster	1999–2000	Regionalliga Nord	18	0	—		18	0
SC Preußen Münster	2000–01	Regionalliga Nord	11	0	—		11	0
SC Preußen Münster	Total		29	0	—		29	0
Borussia Mönchengladbach II	2001–02	Nordrhein	28	0	—		28	0
Borussia Mönchengladbach II	2004–05	Nordrhein	17	0	—		17	0
Borussia Mönchengladbach II	2005–06	Nordrhein	6	0	—		6	0
Borussia Mönchengladbach II	2006–07	Regionalliga Nord	1	0	—		1	0
Borussia Mönchengladbach II	Total		52	0	—		52	0
Borussia Mönchengladbach	2001–02	Bundesliga	3	0	0	0	3	0
Borussia Mönchengladbach	2002–03	Bundesliga	3	0	0	0	3	0
Borussia Mönchengladbach	2003–04	Bundesliga	1	0	1	0	2	0
Borussia Mönchengladbach	2004–05	Bundesliga	1	0	0	0	1	0
Borussia Mönchengladbach	2005–06	Bundesliga	0	0	0	0	0	0
Borussia Mönchengladbach	2006–07	Bundesliga	0	0	0	0	0	0
Borussia Mönchengladbach	Total		8	0	1	0	9	0
Fortuna Düsseldorf	2007–08	Regionalliga Nord	30	0	—		30	0
Fortuna Düsseldorf	2008–09	Regionalliga Nord	38	0	2	0	40	0
Fortuna Düsseldorf	2009–10	2. Bundesliga	1	0	1	0	2	0
Fortuna Düsseldorf	2010–11	2. Bundesliga	19	0	0	0	19	0
Fortuna Düsseldorf	Total		88	0	3	0	91	0
Rot-Weiß Oberhausen	2011–12	3. Liga	30	0	1	0	31	0
Alemannia Aachen	2012–13	3. Liga	9	0	0	0	1	0
Career total			216	0	5	0	221	0
