= Kevin Rauhut =

German footballer

Personal information
- Date of birth: 30 December 1989 (age 36)
- Place of birth: Oberhausen, West Germany
- Height: 1.88 m (6 ft 2 in)
- Position: Goalkeeper

Youth career
- Rot-Weiß Oberhausen
- –2008: SV Straelen

Senior career*
| Years | Team | Apps | (Gls) |
| 2008–2009 | TuRU Düsseldorf | | |
| 2009–2010 | VfB Homberg | 18 | (0) |
| 2010–2011 | Wuppertaler SV II | 25 | (0) |
| 2010–2011 | Wuppertaler SV | 2 | (0) |
| 2012–2013 | Alemannia Aachen II | 15 | (0) |
| 2013 | Alemannia Aachen | 2 | (0) |
| 2013–2014 | Sportfreunde Siegen | 23 | (0) |
| 2014–2016 | Hessen Kassel | 65 | (0) |
| 2016 | Wacker Nordhausen II | 2 | (0) |
| 2016–2018 | Wacker Nordhausen | 31 | (0) |
| 2018–2019 | Energie Cottbus | 12 | (0) |
| 2019–2021 | Fortuna Köln | 57 | (0) |
| 2021–2022 | SGV Freiberg | 5 | (0) |
| 2022–2026 | Viktoria Köln | 8 | (0) |
- * Club domestic league appearances and goals

Kevin Rauhut (born 30 December 1989) is a German former professional footballer who played as a goalkeeper.

== Club career ==
On 31 January 2022, Rauhut signed with 3. Liga club Viktoria Köln.
