= Petar Lela =

Croatian association football player

Personal information
- Date of birth: 17 March 1994 (age 32)
- Place of birth: Split, Croatia
- Height: 1.98 m (6 ft 6 in)
- Position: Centre-back

Team information
- Current team: Bonner SC
- Number: 25

Youth career
- Hajduk Split
- Solin
- RNK Split

Senior career*
Years	Team	Apps	(Gls)
2013	Primorac	12	(1)
2014	Sheriff	2	(0)
2015	Slaven Belupo	2	(0)
2015	Slaven Belupo II	2	(2)
2015	Gorica	7	(0)
2016	Zagora Unešić	14	(2)
2016–2018	Wacker Nordhausen	28	(3)
2018–2020	Rot-Weiß Erfurt	50	(5)
2020–2022	Babelsberg	46	(6)
2022–2025	1. FC Düren	74	(3)
2025–	Bonner SC	7	(0)
- * Club domestic league appearances and goals as of 13 October 2025

Petar Lela (born 17 March 1994) is a Croatian footballer who plays as a centre-back for German Regionalliga West side Bonner SC.
