= Anas Bakhat =

German footballer

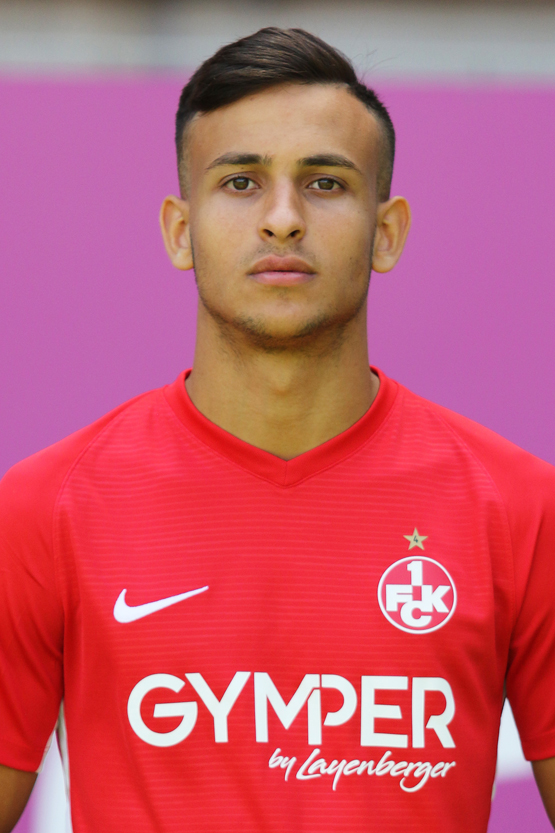
- Bakhat in 2019

Personal information
- Date of birth: 2 April 2000 (age 26)
- Place of birth: Mainz, Germany
- Height: 1.81 m (5 ft 11 in)
- Position: Midfielder

Youth career
- –2017: TSV Schott Mainz
- 2017–2019: 1. FC Kaiserslautern

Senior career*
Years	Team	Apps	(Gls)
2019–2023	1. FC Kaiserslautern II	24	(3)
2020–2023	1. FC Kaiserslautern	23	(0)
2023	1. FC Düren	27	(3)
2024–2025	Alemannia Aachen	27	(6)
2026	Eintracht Braunschweig	3	(0)
- * Club domestic league appearances and goals as of 18 May 2026

Anas Bakhat (born 2 April 2000) is a German professional footballer who plays as a midfielder.

== Club career ==
On 20 January 2023, Bakhat's contract with 1. FC Kaiserslautern was terminated by mutual consent.

On 14 January 2026, Bakhat signed with Eintracht Braunschweig.
