= Sascha Herröder =

German footballer

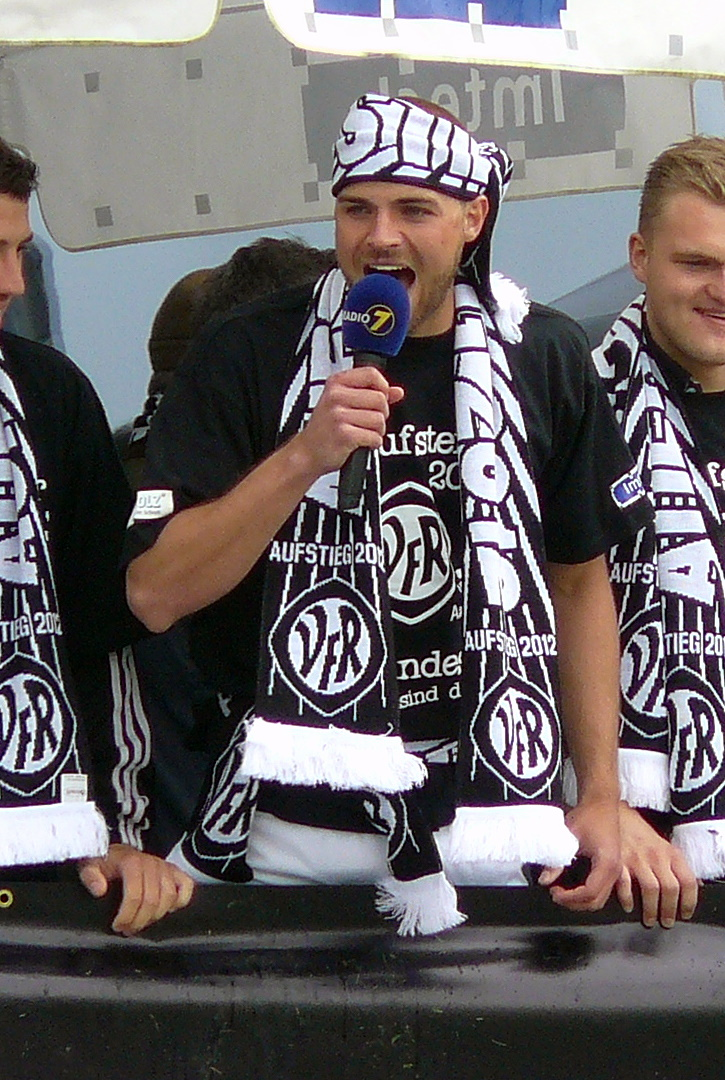
- Herröder in 2012

Personal information
- Date of birth: April 18, 1988 (age 38)
- Place of birth: Groß-Gerau, West Germany
- Height: 1.91 m (6 ft 3 in)
- Position: Central defender

Youth career
- FSV Mainz 05
- SV Darmstadt 98
- –2007: Kickers Offenbach
- 2007: SG Dornheim

Senior career*
Years	Team	Apps	(Gls)
2007–2008	SV Darmstadt 98 II		
2008–2009	Sonnenhof Großaspach		
2009	Viktoria Aschaffenburg	8	(0)
2009–2010	SV Elversberg II	11	(1)
2010	Eintracht Frankfurt II	11	(1)
2010–2012	VfR Aalen	25	(3)
2012–2013	Alemannia Aachen	23	(1)
2013–2014	Sportfreunde Lotte	27	(3)
2014–2015	SpVgg Unterhaching	15	(0)
2015	→ SpVgg Unterhaching II	1	(0)
2016–2017	Wacker Nordhausen	21	(3)
2017–2018	FC Viktoria Köln	1	(0)
Total		143	(12)
- * Club domestic league appearances and goals

Sascha Herröder (born April 18, 1988) is a German retired footballer.
