= Denis Pozder =

Bosnian-German footballer

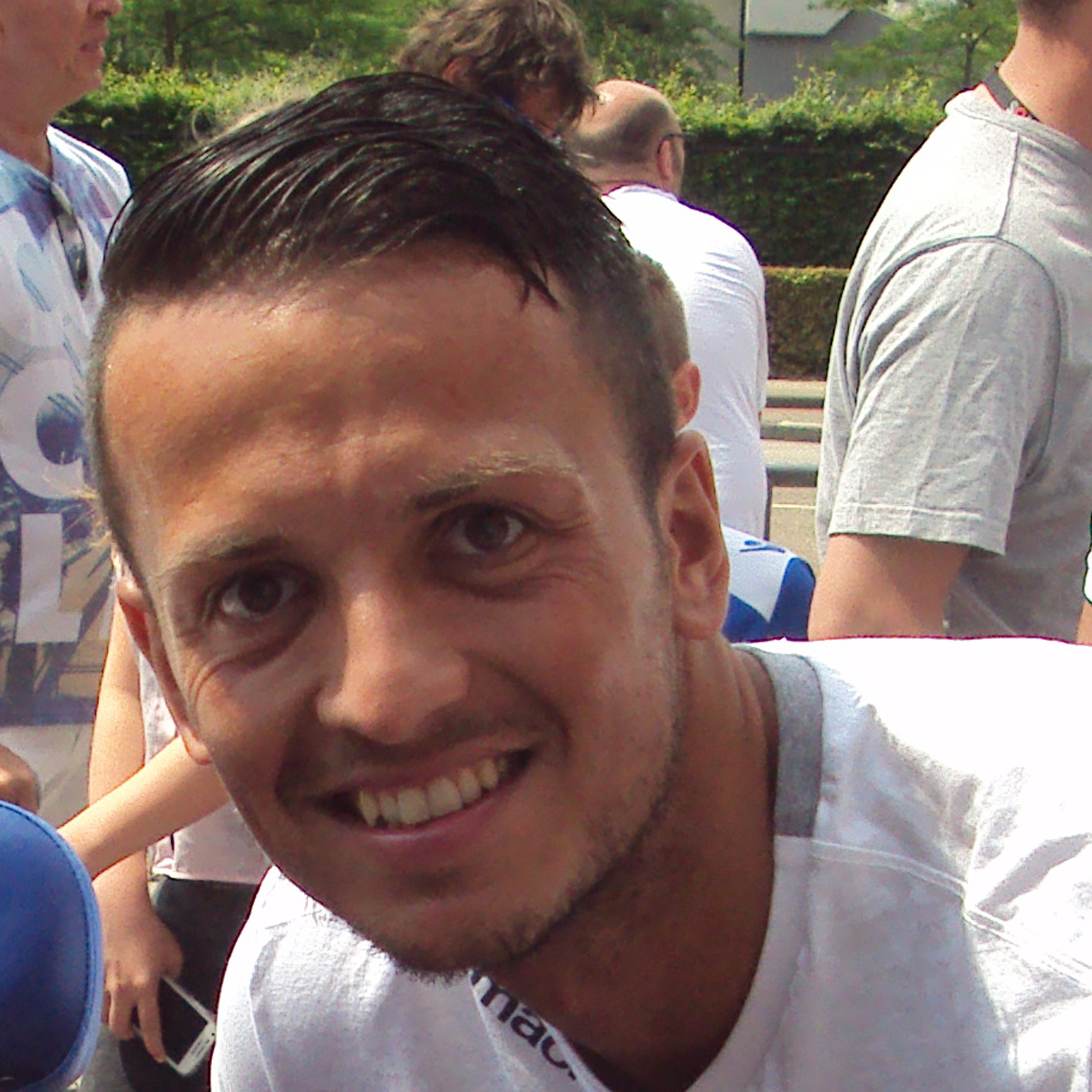
- Pozder in 2015

Personal information
- Date of birth: 11 December 1989 (age 36)
- Place of birth: Mostar, Yugoslavia
- Height: 1.91 m (6 ft 3 in)
- Position: Forward

Youth career
- Borussia Mönchengladbach
- 1. FC Mönchengladbach
- –2006: KFC Uerdingen 05
- 2006–2008: FC Metz

Senior career*
Years	Team	Apps	(Gls)
2008–2010	MSV Duisburg II	56	(21)
2010–2011	Wegberg-Beeck	33	(11)
2011–2012	Alemannia Aachen II	31	(22)
2012–2013	Alemannia Aachen	23	(5)
2013–2014	Vaslui	7	(0)
2014	SSVg Velbert	16	(4)
2014–2015	Eintracht Trier	10	(0)
2015–2016	FC Den Bosch	31	(7)
2016	FK Željezničar Sarajevo	5	(0)
2016–2017	KFC Uerdingen 05	10	(5)
2017–2018	Zug 94	22	(5)
2018	Young Fellows Juventus	10	(3)
2018–2019	Blue Stars Zürich	12	(9)
2019–2020	TSV Hertha Walheim	15	(13)
2020–2021	SV 1927 Kohlscheid		
2021–2022	SV Alemannia Mariadorf	22	(16)
2022–2023	Borussia Freialdenhoven	13	(2)

Managerial career
- 2021–2022: Alemannia Aachen (U-13 manager)
- * Club domestic league appearances and goals

Denis Pozder (born 11 December 1989) is a retired Bosnian-German professional footballer who played as a forward.
