= Marcel Heller =

German footballer (born 1986)

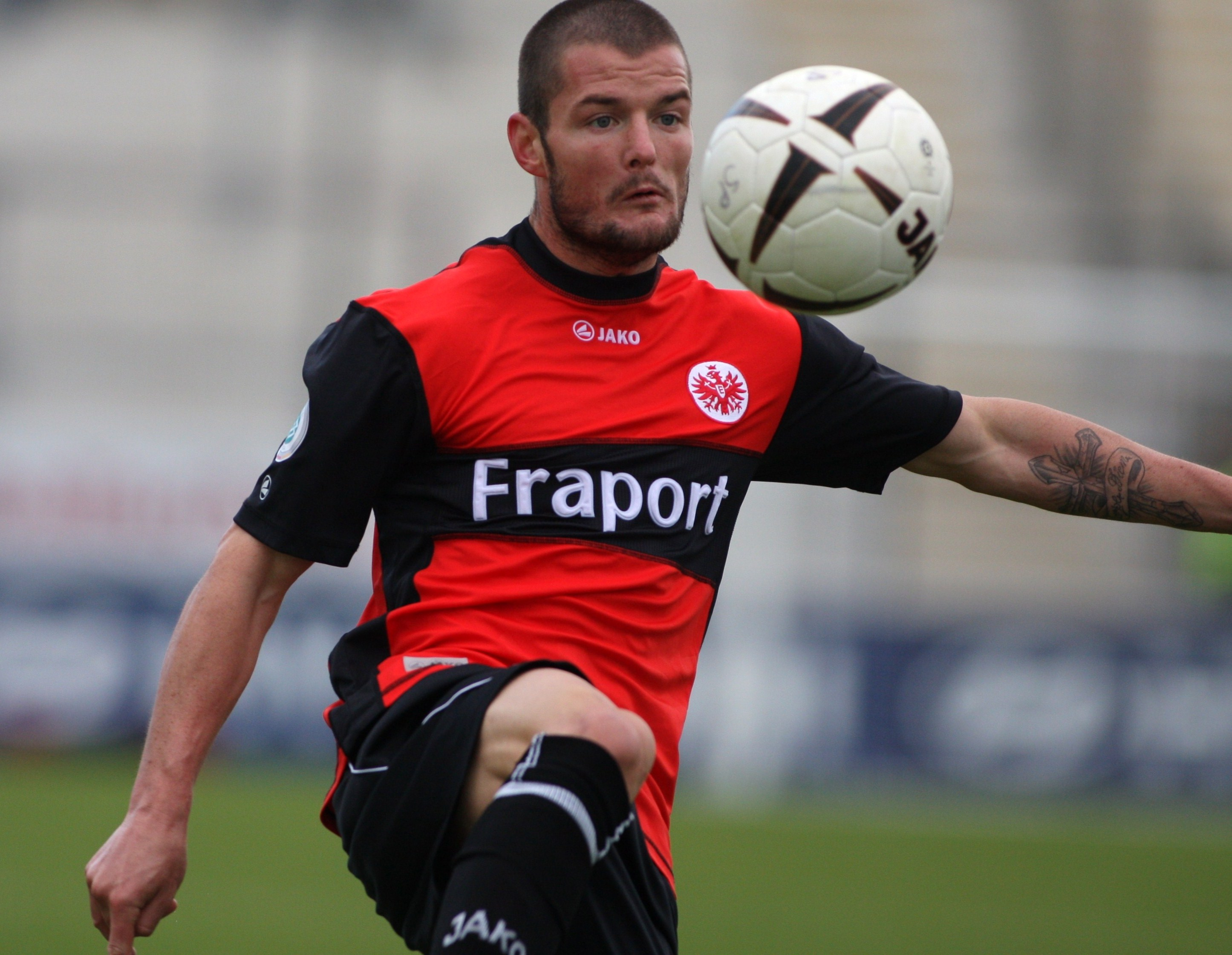
- Heller in 2009

Personal information
- Date of birth: 12 February 1986 (age 40)
- Place of birth: Frechen, West Germany
- Height: 1.76 m (5 ft 9 in)
- Position: Winger

Team information
- Current team: SV Straelen
- Number: 11

Youth career
- 1992–2004: 1. FC Quadrath-Ichendorf

Senior career*
Years	Team	Apps	(Gls)
2004–2005	Bonner SC	2	(1)
2005–2006	Alemannia Aachen II	5	(3)
2006	Sportfreunde Siegen	20	(8)
2007–2011	Eintracht Frankfurt	34	(2)
2007–2011	Eintracht Frankfurt II	40	(10)
2008–2009	→ MSV Duisburg (loan)	18	(1)
2011–2012	Dynamo Dresden	15	(0)
2012–2013	Alemannia Aachen	37	(3)
2013–2017	SV Darmstadt 98	135	(14)
2017–2018	FC Augsburg	24	(0)
2018–2020	Darmstadt 98	58	(6)
2020–2021	SC Paderborn 07	7	(0)
2022	FSV Frankfurt	12	(1)
2022–	SV Straelen	9	(0)

International career
2007–2009	Germany U21	10	(3)
- * Club domestic league appearances and goals as of 12 November 2022

Marcel Heller (born 12 February 1986) is a German footballer who plays as a winger for SV Straelen.

== Career ==
=== Early career ===
In 2006, Heller signed with Regionalliga Süd club Sportfreunde Siegen for its 2006–07 campaign, joining from the Alemannia Aachen reserves. He immediately earned a regular spot and drew attraction in a DFB-Pokal match against Eintracht Frankfurt.

=== Eintracht Frankfurt and loan ===
Eintracht Frankfurt signed Heller in November 2006. He debuted for the eagles coming on as a substitute on 27 January 2007 against Schalke 04. He scored his first Bundesliga goal in an away fixture at Bielefeld on 14 April 2007.

In the 2007–08 campaign, Heller had many injury problems and played only four matches for the first team.

In August 2008, a season long loan deal was confirmed with MSV Duisburg who had been relegated to the 2. Bundesliga.

After the loan, Heller stayed with Eintracht Frankfurt for another two seasons.

=== Dynamo Dresden ===
Heller signed with Dynamo Dresden for the 2011–12 season who had earned promotion to the 2. Bundesliga the previous season.

=== Alemannia Aachen ===
In 2012, Heller joined Alemannia Aachen in the 3. Liga on a two-year deal which was terminated after the first season due to Aachen getting relegated.

=== Darmstadt 98 ===
After the termination of his contract, he signed within the league for SV Darmstadt 98. With The Lilies Heller managed to go through 2 consecutive promotions ending up in the Bundesliga.

=== FC Augsburg ===
In June 2017, Heller signed with FC Augsburg on a free transfer agreeing to a two-year contract.

=== Return to Darmstadt 98 ===
On 28 July 2018, Darmstadt 98 announced that Heller would return to the club on a two-year contract.
