= Oliver Heil =

German footballer

Personal information
- Date of birth: 19 June 1988 (age 38)
- Place of birth: Darmstadt, West Germany
- Height: 1.83 m (6 ft 0 in)
- Position: Striker

Team information
- Current team: SC Hessen Dreieich
- Number: 9

Youth career
- SV Rohrbach
- SV Darmstadt 98
- –2007: FSV Mainz 05

Senior career*
Years	Team	Apps	(Gls)
2007–2009	FSV Mainz 05 II	24	(8)
2009–2010	SV Waldhof Mannheim	7	(1)
2010–2012	SV Darmstadt 98	65	(20)
2012–2013	SV Babelsberg 03	17	(1)
2013–2014	Eintracht Wald-Michelbach		
2014–	SC Hessen Dreieich		
- * Club domestic league appearances and goals as of 25 June 2015

Oliver Heil (born 19 June 1988) is a German footballer who plays as a striker for SC Hessen Dreieich.

== Career ==
Heil played as a youth for SV Rohrbach and SV Darmstadt 98 before joining FSV Mainz, where he broke into reserve team in 2008. After scoring eight goals in his first season he joined SV Waldhof Mannheim where he spent six months before returning to Darmstadt in January 2010. In his first full season with Darmstadt he finished as the club's top scorer, with twelve goals, as they won the Regionalliga Süd title, and promotion to the 3. Liga. He made his first appearance at this level in August 2011, as a substitute for Kevin Wölk in a 1–0 win over SV Wehen Wiesbaden. He left Darmstadt at the end of the season, signing for SV Babelsberg 03, also of the 3. Liga where he spent a year, leaving in July 2013 after the club were relegated to the Regionalliga Nordost. Shortly afterwards he signed for amateur side Eintracht Wald-Michelbach.
