= Sascha Marquet =

German footballer (born 1989)

Personal information
- Date of birth: 7 November 1989 (age 36)
- Place of birth: Leverkusen, West Germany
- Height: 1.88 m (6 ft 2 in)
- Positions: Forward; attacking midfielder

Youth career
- SSV Lützenkirchen
- SV Schlebusch
- –2004: TuS Quettingen
- 2004–2007: VfL Leverkusen
- 2007–2008: Bayer Leverkusen

Senior career*
Years	Team	Apps	(Gls)
2008–2010	Bayer Leverkusen II	68	(8)
2011–2012	Alemannia Aachen II	40	(14)
2012–2014	Alemannia Aachen	55	(11)
2014–2015	Fortuna Köln	23	(2)
2015–2021	TSV Steinbach	164	(48)
2021–2023	Fortuna Köln	66	(27)
2023–2025	Alemannia Aachen	2	(0)
- * Club domestic league appearances and goals as of 17 May 2025

Sascha Marquet (born 7 November 1989) is a German footballer who plays as a forward or attacking midfielder.

In his youth he went through the ranks of five clubs from his hometown Leverkusen: SSV Lützenkirchen, SV Schlebusch, TuS Quettingen (until 2004), VfL Leverkusen (2004–07) and Bayer Leverkusen (2007–08).
