= Andreas Korte =

German footballer

Personal information
- Full name: Andreas Korte
- Date of birth: 23 March 1989 (age 37)
- Place of birth: Simmerath, West Germany
- Height: 1.81 m (5 ft 11 in)
- Position: Defender

Youth career
- VfL Leipheim
- FC Günzburg
- SV Eilendorf
- 2007–2008: Alemannia Aachen

Senior career*
Years	Team	Apps	(Gls)
2008–2012	Alemannia Aachen II	89	(4)
2010–2012	Alemannia Aachen	2	(0)
2012–2014	KFC Uerdingen 05	41	(0)
- * Club domestic league appearances and goals as of 17 July 2013

Andreas Korte (born 23 March 1989) is a German footballer who plays as a defender.
