= Lennart Hartmann =

German footballer (born 1991)

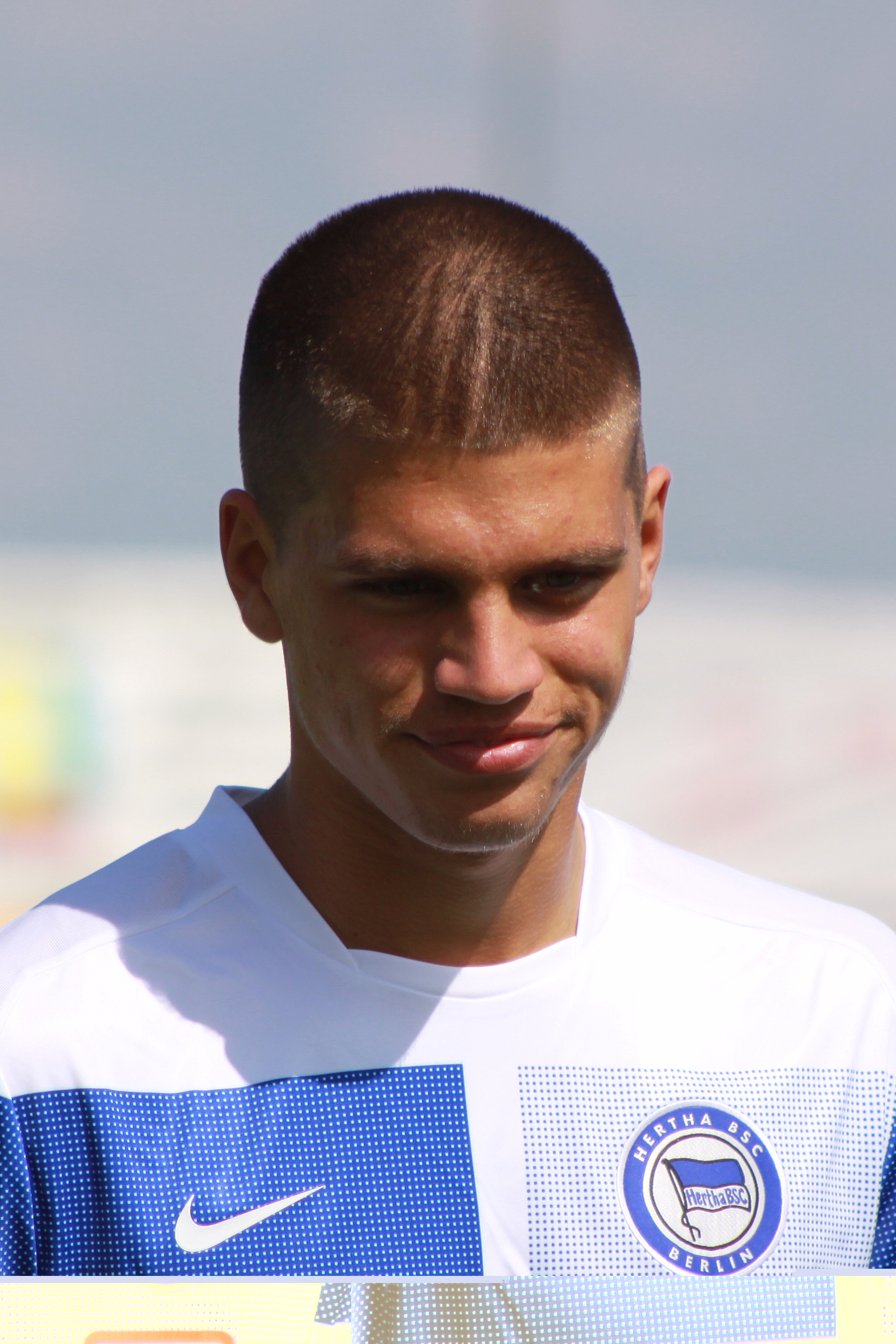
- Hartmann in 2009

Personal information
- Full name: Lennart Hartmann
- Date of birth: 3 April 1991 (age 35)
- Place of birth: Berlin, Germany
- Height: 1.70 m (5 ft 7 in)
- Position: Defensive midfielder

Team information
- Current team: BFC Preussen II
- Number: 24

Youth career
- Hertha Zehlendorf
- –2002: Mariendorfer SV
- 2002–2007: Hertha BSC

Senior career*
Years	Team	Apps	(Gls)
2007–2011	Hertha BSC II	23	(1)
2008–2011	Hertha BSC	3	(0)
2011–2012	Alemannia Aachen II	8	(2)
2011–2012	Alemannia Aachen	0	(0)
2012–2013	SV Babelsberg 03	29	(0)
2013–2014	Berliner AK 07	20	(0)
2014–2016	Tennis Borussia Berlin	44	(10)
2016–2017	VSG Altglienicke	22	(1)
2018–2019	Berlin United	39	(14)
2019–2022	BFC Preussen	32	(12)
2022–	BFC Preussen II	3	(0)

International career
2006–2007	Germany U16	10	(1)
2007–2008	Germany U17	11	(1)
2009	Germany U18	8	(0)
2009–2010	Germany U19	10	(0)
- * Club domestic league appearances and goals as of 16:56, 22 April 2024 (UTC)

Lennart Hartmann (born 3 April 1991) is a German footballer who plays as a midfielder for BFC Preussen II.

== Career ==
Born in Berlin, Hartmann started his professional career with Hertha BSC, making his first appearance on 31 July 2008 in the 2008–09 UEFA Cup first qualifying round second leg against Nistru Otaci. He made his Bundesliga debut on 17 August 2008 in the opening fixture against Eintracht Frankfurt when he came on in the 67th minute to replace Gojko Kačar. The appearance made him the youngest player ever to for Hertha BSC in the Bundesliga and the sixth youngest Bundesliga player of all time, at the age of 17 years and 103 days. In January 2011, Hartmann had a trial spell with Canadian club Vancouver Whitecaps.

In June 2011, Hartmann signed for the 2. Bundesliga club Alemannia Aachen. Failing to make a single appearance in six months, Hartmann left Aachen in January 2012 to join 3. Liga club SV Babelsberg 03. He left Babelsberg in July 2013 after the club were relegated to play for Berliner AK 07 in the Regionalliga Nordost, and in the summer of 2014, joined Tennis Borussia Berlin in the sixth-tier Berlin-Liga.
