= Tobias Feisthammel =

German footballer

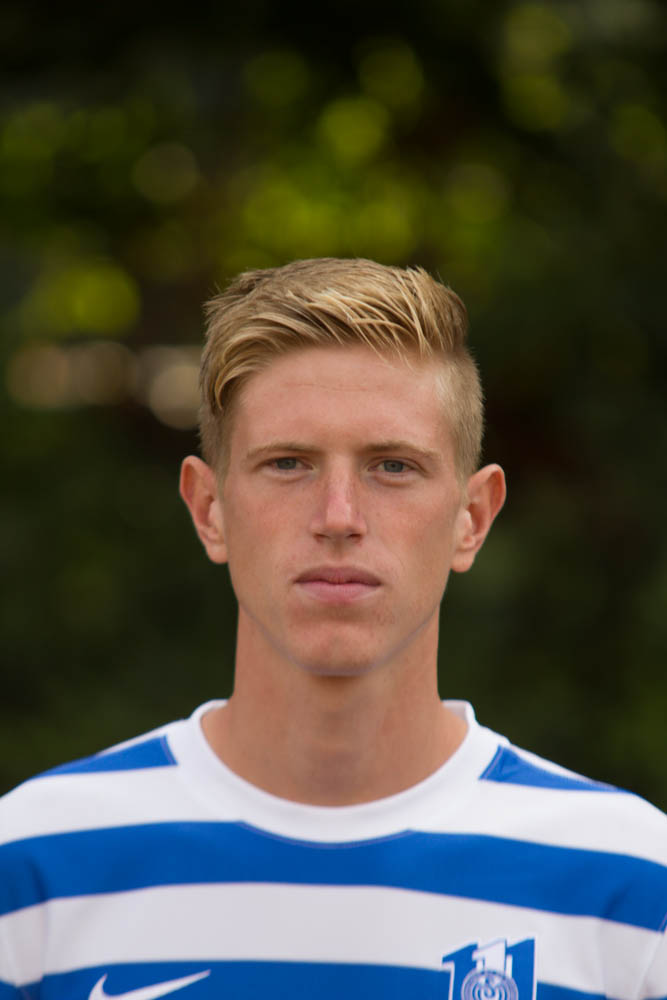
- Feisthammel in 2013

Personal information
- Full name: Tobias Achim Feisthammel
- Date of birth: 22 February 1988 (age 38)
- Place of birth: Reutlingen, West Germany
- Height: 1.88 m (6 ft 2 in)
- Position: Defender

Team information
- Current team: SV Breuningsweiler (player-assistant)
- Number: 18

Youth career
- 1992–1997: TuS Metzingen
- 1997–2002: SSV Reutlingen
- 2002–2006: VfB Stuttgart

Senior career*
Years	Team	Apps	(Gls)
2006–2010	VfB Stuttgart II	84	(2)
2010–2012	Alemannia Aachen	60	(4)
2012	Alemannia Aachen II	1	(0)
2012–2013	SC Paderborn	16	(1)
2013–2014	MSV Duisburg	24	(1)
2014–2016	SV Elversberg	48	(3)
2016–2017	VfB Stuttgart II	51	(6)
2017–2020	Stuttgarter Kickers	62	(2)
2020–2021	TSV Essingen	10	(0)
2021–	SV Breuningsweiler	42	(1)

Managerial career
- 2021–: SV Breuningsweiler (player-assistant)
- * Club domestic league appearances and goals

Tobias Achim Feisthammel (born 22 February 1988) is a German footballer who plays as a defender for SV Breuningsweiler.
