= Seyi Olajengbesi =

Nigerian footballer

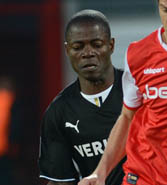
- Olajengbesi in 2013

Personal information
- Full name: Seyi Olajengbesi
- Date of birth: 17 November 1980 (age 45)
- Place of birth: Ibadan, Nigeria
- Height: 1.96 m (6 ft 5 in)
- Position: Defender

Senior career*
Years	Team	Apps	(Gls)
1996	Shooting Stars		
1997–2000	Plateau United		
2001–2004	Julius Berger FC		
2002	→ Shooting Stars (loan)		
2004–2007	SC Freiburg	62	(1)
2008–2013	Alemannia Aachen	146	(5)
2013–2016	SV Sandhausen	76	(3)
Total		284	(9)

International career
2002–2004	Nigeria	8	(0)
- * Club domestic league appearances and goals

Seyi Olajengbesi (born 17 November 1980 in Ibadan) is a Nigerian former professional footballer who played as a defender who spent most of his career in Germany, playing for Alemannia Aachen, SC Freiburg, and SV Sandhausen.
