= Saša Strujić =

Bosnian footballer

Personal information
- Date of birth: 8 December 1991 (age 34)
- Place of birth: Sarajevo, SFR Yugoslavia
- Height: 1.85 m (6 ft 1 in)
- Position: Defender

Youth career
- –2008: Alemannia Aachen
- 2008–2010: Germania Dürwiß

Senior career*
Years	Team	Apps	(Gls)
2010–2011	Germania Dürwiß	27	(4)
2011–2014	Alemannia Aachen II	38	(5)
2013–2014	Alemannia Aachen	41	(1)
2014	TSG Neustrelitz	0	(0)
2014–2015	VfL Wolfsburg II	11	(0)
2015–2023	TSV Steinbach Haiger	248	(21)
2023–2026	Alemannia Aachen	94	(12)
- * Club domestic league appearances and goals as of 28 May 2026

Saša Strujić (born 8 December 1991) is a Bosnian footballer who plays as a defender.
