= Florian Müller (footballer, born 1986) =

German footballer

Personal information
- Date of birth: 30 December 1986 (age 39)
- Place of birth: Eisenhüttenstadt, East Germany
- Height: 1.80 m (5 ft 11 in)
- Position: Midfielder

Youth career
- 1992–2001: FC Stahl Eisenhüttenstadt
- 2001–2004: Union Berlin

Senior career*
Years	Team	Apps	(Gls)
2004–2005	Union Berlin	16	(0)
2005–2007	Bayern Munich II	28	(0)
2007–2008	1. FC Magdeburg	36	(2)
2008–2013	Alemannia Aachen	55	(4)
Total		125	(6)

International career
2004–2005	Germany U19	11	(3)
2004–2005	Germany U20	1	(0)
- * Club domestic league appearances and goals

Florian Müller (born 30 December 1986) is a German former footballer who played as a midfielder.

== Honours ==
- Fritz-Walter-Medal 2005 in Gold (Category U19)
