= Robert Leipertz =

German footballer

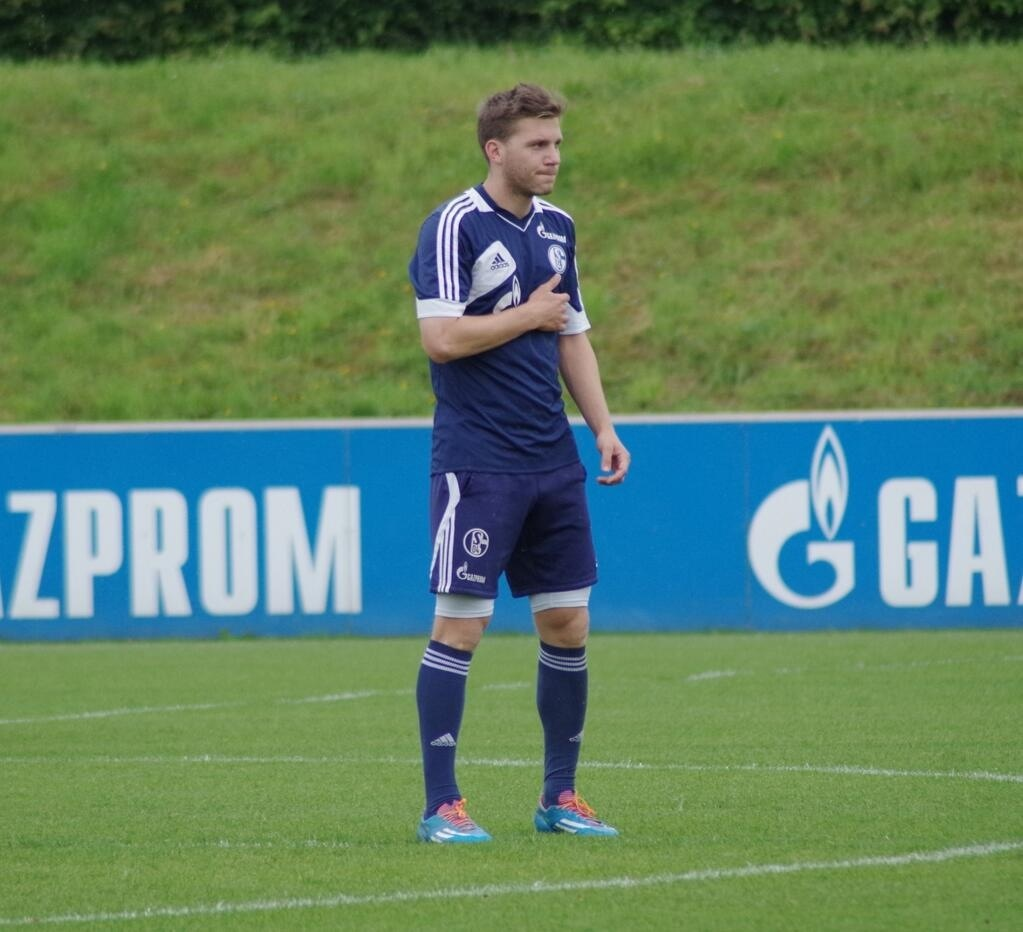
- Leipertz training with Schalke 04 II in 2014

Personal information
- Date of birth: 1 February 1993 (age 33)
- Place of birth: Jülich, Germany
- Height: 1.83 m (6 ft 0 in)
- Position: Forward

Team information
- Current team: Greifswalder FC
- Number: 13

Youth career
- 1997–2006: Rasensport Tetz
- 2006–2007: Bedburger BV
- 2007–2008: Viktoria Arnoldsweiler
- 2008–2012: Alemannia Aachen

Senior career*
| Years | Team | Apps | (Gls) |
| 2012–2013 | Alemannia Aachen II | 8 | (7) |
| 2012–2013 | Alemannia Aachen | 19 | (5) |
| 2013–2014 | Schalke 04 II | 35 | (20) |
| 2014–2016 | 1. FC Heidenheim | 65 | (18) |
| 2016–2019 | FC Ingolstadt | 38 | (6) |
| 2016–2019 | FC Ingolstadt II | 5 | (7) |
| 2019–2022 | 1. FC Heidenheim | 87 | (15) |
| 2022–2024 | Paderborn | 57 | (12) |
| 2024–2026 | 1. FC Magdeburg | 0 | (0) |
| 2024–2026 | 1. FC Magdeburg II | 27 | (8) |
| 2025 | → SSV Ulm (loan) | 4 | (0) |
| 2026– | Greifswalder FC | 9 | (2) |
- * Club domestic league appearances and goals as of 23 September 2026

Robert Leipertz (born 1 February 1993) is a German footballer who plays as a forward for Regionalliga Nordost club Greifswalder FC.

== Club career ==
On 3 May 2022, Leipertz signed a two-year contract with SC Paderborn, effective 1 July 2022.

On 30 May 2024, Leipertz moved to 1. FC Magdeburg. On 2 February 2025, he was loaned by SSV Ulm.
