= Aïmen Demai =

Tunisian footballer (born 1982)

Personal information
- Full name: Aïmen Demai
- Date of birth: 10 December 1982 (age 43)
- Place of birth: Thionville, France
- Height: 1.81 m (5 ft 11 in)
- Positions: Defender; defensive midfielder

Youth career
- 1994–1995: Uckange US
- 1995–1998: FC Woippy
- 1998–2000: Metz

Senior career*
Years	Team	Apps	(Gls)
2000–2004	Metz	17	(0)
2004–2006	1. FC Saarbrücken	63	(5)
2006–2009	1. FC Kaiserslautern	70	(3)
2009–2013	Alemannia Aachen	62	(10)
2014–2016	Alemannia Aachen	49	(6)
Total		261	(24)

International career
2003	Algeria	1	(0)
2009	Tunisia	2	(0)

Managerial career
- 2015: Alemannia Aachen (caretaker)
- 2016–2017: Alemannia Aachen U17
- 2019–2020: Alemannia Aachen U17
- 2020–: Fortuna Düsseldorf U17 II
- * Club domestic league appearances and goals

Aïmen Demai (Arabic: أيمن الدمعي; born 10 December 1982) is a former professional footballer who played as a defender or defensive midfielder. Born in France, he played for the Algeria national team before switching to the Tunisia national team.

== International career ==
Demai played for the Algeria national team in the youth stages, before he switched to play for the Tunisia national team. He has one cap for the Algerian national team in a 1–0 win over Qatar in 2003. He also participated in a friendly against French club Rennes two days later. Demai was recalled by the Tunisian National Team coach Humberto Coelho for the friendly game against Netherlands on 11 February 2009.

== Personal life ==
Demai was born in Thionville, France, to an Algerian father and a Tunisian mother. He holds both French and Tunisian nationalities.
