= Christian Weber (footballer) =

German footballer

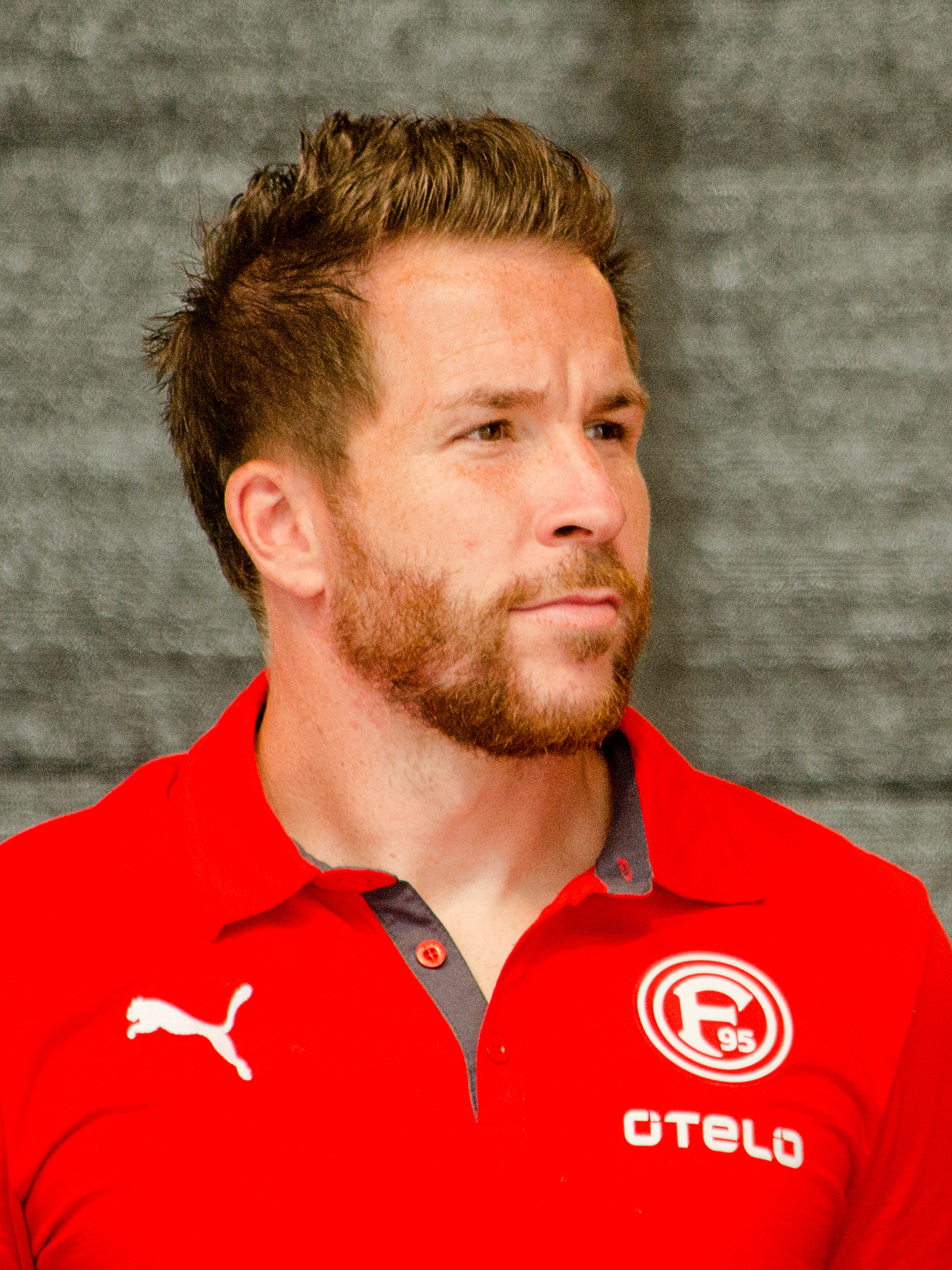
- Weber with Fortuna Düsseldorf in July 2014

Personal information
- Date of birth: 15 September 1983 (age 43)
- Place of birth: Saarbrücken, West Germany
- Height: 1.75 m (5 ft 9 in)
- Positions: Defender; midfielder

Youth career
- 1987–1989: SV Naßweiler
- 1989–1994: SV Emmersweiler
- 1994–1995: SC Großrosseln
- 1995–2000: 1. FC Saarbrücken

Senior career*
Years	Team	Apps	(Gls)
2000–2002	1. FC Saarbrücken	24	(1)
2002–2006	Greuther Fürth	120	(1)
2006–2008	MSV Duisburg	44	(0)
2008–2009	AEL	19	(0)
2009–2012	Fortuna Düsseldorf	61	(1)
2010–2012	Fortuna Düsseldorf II	6	(1)
2012–2013	Alemannia Aachen	9	(0)
2013–2018	Fortuna Düsseldorf II	97	(9)
2013–2015	Fortuna Düsseldorf	22	(0)
Total		402	(13)

International career
2001	Germany U19	1	(0)
2002–2003	Germany U20	2	(0)
- Germany U21
- * Club domestic league appearances and goals

Christian Weber (born 15 September 1983 in Saarbrücken, West Germany) is a German former professional footballer who could play as either a defender or a midfielder.
