= David Hohs =

German footballer (born 1988)

Personal information
- Date of birth: 16 March 1988 (age 38)
- Place of birth: Leverkusen, West Germany
- Height: 1.85 m (6 ft 1 in)
- Position: Goalkeeper

Team information
- Current team: SV Weiden 1914/75

Youth career
- 1994–2007: Bayer Leverkusen

Senior career*
Years	Team	Apps	(Gls)
2007–2009	Alemannia Aachen II	61	(0)
2009–2012	Alemannia Aachen	39	(0)
2012–2014	1. FC Kaiserslautern	0	(0)
2014–2016	1. FC Saarbrücken	60	(0)
2016	Germania Erftstadt-Lechenich II	99	(43)
2016–2020	Germania Erftstadt-Lechenich	1	(0)
2020–	SV Weiden 1914/75	6	(3)
- * Club domestic league appearances and goals as of 27 January 2021

David Hohs (born 16 March 1988) is a German footballer who plays for SV Weiden 1914/75.

== Career ==
=== Early career ===
Hohs was raised in Cologne and played in his youth 13 years for Bayer Leverkusen where he won the under 19 Bundesliga in 2007.

In 2003, Charly Körbel led him to the Eintracht Frankfurt football academy. Here he played until July 2006 before moving to the academy of Blackburn Rovers.

=== Alemannia Aachen ===
In the 2007–08 season, he joined the second team of Alemannia Aachen to find better chances than in Bayer Leverkusen which had three excellent goal keepers at the time. After the transfer of Kristian Nicht to Norway he was called up to join the first team as a third keeper, received the number 22 and continued to play for the second team. On 13 September 2009, he had his first game in the 2. Bundesliga replacing the ill Thorsten Stuckmann. Under his new coach Peter Hyballa he became the first keeper and received the number one for the begin of the 2011–12 season.

=== 1. FC Kaiserslautern ===
In summer 2012, Hohs joined 1. FC Kaiserslautern on a free transfer. He spent two years with the club as a backup 'keeper, without making a league appearance.

=== 1. FC Saarbrücken ===
Hohs signed for Regionalliga Südwest side 1. FC Saarbrücken at the end of the 2013–14 season.
