= 2012–13 VfB Stuttgart II season =

VfB Stuttgart II
2012–13 season
- Stadium: Gazi Stadion, Stuttgart, BW
- 3. Liga: TBD

The 2012–13 VfB Stuttgart II season is the season for the reserve team for VfB Stuttgart. The season began on 21 July 2012 and will end on 18 May 2013. They are participating in the 3. Liga.

== Review and events ==
The season began on 21 July 2012 with a loss against 1. FC Saarbrücken and will end on 18 May 2013 against Borussia Dortmund II. They are participating in the 3. Liga.

== Fixtures and results ==
=== Legend ===
Win Draw Loss Postponed

=== 3. Liga ===
==== League fixtures and results ====
21 July 2012 1	VfB Stuttgart II	0–1	1. FC Saarbrücken	Stuttgart
14:15 CEST (UTC+02:00)	Berko (yellow card) 31'; Vitzthum (yellow card) 83'	Report (in German)	Eggert (yellow card) 39'; Ziemer 53'	Stadium: Gazi-Stadion auf der Waldau; Attendance: 1,525; Referee: Malte Dittrich (Bremen)

28 July 2012 2	Kickers Offenbach	1–3	VfB Stuttgart II	Offenbach
14:00 CEST (UTC+02:00)	Kleineheismann (yellow card) 37'; Fetsch 64'	Report (in German)	Janzer 20'; Benyamina 52'; Hemlein 61'	Stadium: Sparda-Bank-Hessen-Stadion; Attendance: 7,393; Referee: Harm Osmers (Hannover)

4 August 2012 3	VfB Stuttgart II	2–0	Karlsruher SC	Stuttgart
14:00 CEST (UTC+02:00)	Rathgeb 3' (yellow card) 36'; Hemlein 29'	Report (in German)	Cagara (yellow card) 44'; Schiek (yellow card) 72'; Haas (yellow card) 89'	Stadium: Mercedes-Benz-Arena; Attendance: 19,970; Referee: Arne Aarnink (Nordhorn)

7 August 2012 4	Rot-Weiß Erfurt	1–1	VfB Stuttgart II	Erfurt
19:00 CEST (UTC+02:00)	Pfingsten-Reddig 3'; Möhwald (yellow card) 45'; Engelhardt (yellow card) 68'	Report (in German)	Janzer (yellow card) 37'; Röcker 76'; Benyamina (yellow card) 90'	Stadium: Steigerwaldstadion; Attendance: 3,802; Referee: Sören Storks (Velen)

11 August 2012 5	VfB Stuttgart II	1–4	Stuttgart Kickers	Stuttgart
14:00 CEST (UTC+02:00)	Benyamina 13'; Rathgeb (yellow card) 35'; Röcker (yellow card) 79'; Berko (yellow card) 87'	Report (in German)	Fennell 20'; Grüttner 44' 90'; Evers (yellow card) 47'; Savranlioglu 55' (yellow card) 76'; Leist (yellow card) 70'; Stadler (yellow card) 88'	Stadium: Gazi-Stadion auf der Waldau; Attendance: 6,125; Referee: Robert Hartmann (Wangen)

25 August 2012 6	SpVgg Unterhaching	0–3	VfB Stuttgart II	Unterhaching
14:00 CEST (UTC+02:00)	Schwabl (yellow card) 45'	Report (in German)	Stöger (red card); Vitzthum 58'; Janzer 81'; Kiefer 89'	Stadium: Stadion am Sportpark; Attendance: 1,800; Referee: Norbert Giese (Großräschen)

29 August 2012 7	VfB Stuttgart II	2–1	SV Babelsberg 03	Stuttgart
19:00 CEST (UTC+02:00)	Hemlein (yellow card) 16'; Holzhauser (yellow card) 31'; Benyamina 37'; Janzer (yellow card) 41'; Rathgeb 45'; Berko (yellow card) 81'	Report (in German)		Stadium: Gazi-Stadion auf der Waldau; Attendance: 610; Referee: Jonas Weickenmeier (Frankfurt)

1 September 2012 8	Preußen Münster	0–0	VfB Stuttgart II	Münster
14:00 CEST (UTC+02:00)	Grote (yellow card) 19'; Schmidt (yellow card) 37'; Truckenbrod (yellow card) 50'	Report (in German)	Vier (yellow card) 52'; Röcker (yellow card) 72'; Rüdiger (red card)	Stadium: Preußenstadion; Attendance: 6,024; Referee: Eduard Beitinger (Regensburg)

14 September 2012 9	VfB Stuttgart II	0–1	Chemnitzer FC	Stuttgart
19:00 CEST (UTC+02:00)		Report (in German)	Hörnig (yellow card) 25'; Buchner (yellow card) 33'; Kegel 68'	Stadium: Gazi-Stadion auf der Waldau; Attendance: 1,055; Referee: Patrick Alt (Heusweiler)

22 September 2012 10	SV Darmstadt 98	3–1	VfB Stuttgart II	Stuttgart
14:00 CET (UTC+01:00)	Hesse 16'; Steegmann (yellow card) 36'; Gaebler 71' (pen.); Behrens 75'; Schnier (yellow card) 82'	Report (in German)	Rathgeb 51'; Weis (yellow card) 69'; Hemlein (yellow card) 75'	Stadium: Mercedes-Benz Arena; Attendance: 4,500; Referee: Florian Heft (Wietmarschen)

25 September 2012 11	VfB Stuttgart II	0–2	Hansa Rostock	Stuttgart
19:00 CET (UTC+01:00)	Rüdiger (yellow card) 28'	Report (in German)	Smetana 11' (yellow card) 67'; Plat 80'	Stadium: Gazi-Stadion auf der Waldau; Attendance: 1,065; Referee: Lothar Ostheimer (Pfaffenhofen a.d. Ilm)

29 September 2012 12	SV Wehen Wiesbaden	0–0	VfB Stuttgart II	Wiesbaden
14:00 CET (UTC+01:00)	Herzig (yellow card) 16'	Report (in German)		Stadium: Brita-Arena; Attendance: 2,903; Referee: Karl Valentin (Taufkirchen)

6 October 2012 13	VfB Stuttgart II	0–2	1. FC Heidenheim	Stuttgart
14:00 CET (UTC+01:00)	Vier (yellow card) 56'; Kiesewetter (red card) 90'	Report (in German)	Christian Sauter 30'; Tausendpfund (yellow card) 35'; Göhlert 57'	Stadium: Gazi-Stadion auf der Waldau; Attendance: 1,150; Referee: Sebastian Schmickartz (Berlin)

20 October 2012 14	Hallescher FC	1–4	VfB Stuttgart II	Halle
14:00 CET (UTC+01:00)	Preuß (yellow card) 28' (yellow-red card) 53'; Mast 42' (yellow card) 70'	Report (in German)	Rathgeb (yellow card) 41'; Stöger (yellow card) 55'; Rüdiger 64'; Janzer 77'; Benyamina 85'	Stadium: Erdgas-Sportpark; Attendance: 7,002; Referee: Tim Sönder (Kiel)

27 October 2012 15	Wacker Burghausen	1–3	VfB Stuttgart II	Burghausen
14:00 CET (UTC+01:00)	Luz (yellow card) 25'; Strifler (yellow card) 43'; Thiel 45'; Vollath (red card) 88'	Report (in German)	Khedira (yellow card) 44'; Janzer 50'; Vecchione (yellow card) 64'; Benyamina 67' (75)	Stadium: Wacker-Arena; Attendance: 2,200; Referee: Jonas Weickenmeier (Frankfurt)

3 November 2012 16	VfB Stuttgart II	1–2	VfL Osnabrück	Stuttgart
14:00 CET (UTC+01:00)	Benyamina 31'; Khedira (yellow card) 64'	Report (in German)	Nagy 60'; Manno 65'	Stadium: Gazi-Stadion auf der Waldau; Attendance: 520; Referee: Benjamin Cortus (Röthenbach a. d. Pegnitz)

11 October 2012 17	Arminia Bielefeld	1–1	VfB Stuttgart II	Bielefeld
14:00 CET (UTC+01:00)	Hille (yellow card) 3'; Testroet 66'; Klos (yellow card) 89'	Report (in German)	Janzer (yellow card) 15'; Benyamina 38'; Stöger (yellow card) 57'; Weis (yellow card) 86'	Stadium: Schüco-Arena; Attendance: 6,262; Referee: Arne Aarnink (Nordhorn)

17 November 2012 18	VfB Stuttgart II	2–1	Alemannia Aachen	Stuttgart
14:00 CET (UTC+01:00)	Benyamina 27' (76)	Report (in German)	Melka (yellow card) 26'; Schwertfeger 34'; Olajengbesi (yellow card) 51'; Wilschrey (yellow card) 90'	Stadium: Gazi-Stadion auf der Waldau; Attendance: 710; Referee: Thomas Stein (Weibersbrunn)

24 November 2012 19	Borussia Dortmund II	0–2	VfB Stuttgart II	Dortmund
14:00 CET (UTC+01:00)	Amini (yellow card) 26'; Bakalorz (red card) 26'	Report (in German)	Hemlein 39'; Benyamina 59'; Enderle (yellow card) 72'	Stadium: Rote Erde; Attendance: 282; Referee: Timo Gerach (Landau)

1 December 2012 20	1. FC Saarbrücken	0–0	VfB Stuttgart II	Saarbrücken
14:00 CET (UTC+01:00)	Bach (yellow card) 55'; Ziemer (yellow card) 75'	Report (in German)	Geyer (yellow card) 15'; Khedira (yellow card) 70'; Audel (yellow card) 75'	Stadium: Ludwigsparkstadion; Attendance: 3,284; Referee: Karl Valentin (Taufkirchen)

5 February 2013 21	VfB Stuttgart II	1–0	Kickers Offenbach	Stuttgart
18:30 CET (UTC+01:00)	Benyamina 78' (yellow card) 88'; Maletic (yellow card) 85'	Report (in German)	Rathgeber (yellow card) 41' (yellow-red card) 88'	Stadium: Mercedes-Benz Arena; Attendance: 350; Referee: Sascha Stegemann (Niederkassel)

15 December 2012 22	Karlsruher SC	3–1	VfB Stuttgart II	Karlsruhe
14:00 CET (UTC+01:00)	van der Biezen 3' (yellow card) 76'; Klingmann (yellow card) 27'; Peitz 51'; Blum 90'	Report (in German)	Rathgeb 11' (pen.); Kiefer (yellow card) 28' (yellow-red card) 45'; Stöger (yellow card) 31'; Enderle (yellow card) 38'; Vecchione (yellow card) 65'	Stadium: Wildparkstadion; Attendance: 13,113; Referee: Christian Dietz (Kronach)

3 April 2013 23	VfB Stuttgart	1–0	Rot-Weiß Erfurt	Stuttgart
18:30 CET (UTC+01:00)	Benyamina (yellow card) 42'; Hemlein 67'; Kiefer (yellow card) 90'	Report (in German)		Stadium: Gazi-Stadion auf der Waldau; Attendance: 540; Referee: Robert Kempter (Sauldorf)

8 March 2013 24	Stuttgarter Kickers	3–0	VfB Stuttgart II	Stuttgart
17:30 CET (UTC+01:00)	Grüttner 14' (31); Gondorf 27'	Report (in German)	Rathgeb (yellow card) 44'; Vitzthum (yellow card) 56'; Röcker (yellow card) 74'	Stadium: Gazi-Stadion auf der Waldau; Attendance: 4,100; Referee: Thorsten Kinhöfer (Herne)

12 March 2013 25	VfB Stuttgart II	0–0	SpVgg Unterhaching	Stuttgart
18:30 CET (UTC+01:00)	Rathgeb (yellow card) 57'; Kiefer (yellow card) 73'	Report (in German)	Hofstetter (yellow card) 52'; Schwabl (yellow card) 78'	Stadium: Gazi-Stadion auf der Waldau; Attendance: 235; Referee: Martin Thomsen (Kleve)

10 April 2013 26	SV Babelsberg 03	0–0	VfB Stuttgart II	Potsdam-Babelsberg
19:00 CET (UTC+01:00)	Reiche (yellow card) 23'; Evljuskin (yellow card) 65'; Kragl (yellow card) 83'	Report (in German)	Enderle (yellow card) 87'	Stadium: Karl-Liebknecht-Stadion; Attendance: 2,038; Referee: Eduard Beitinger (Regensburg)

26 March 2013 27	VfB Stuttgart II	0–1	Preußen Münster	Stuttgart
20:00 CEST (UTC+01:00)	Janzer (yellow card) 65'; Vitzthum (yellow card) 74'; Hemlein (yellow card) 90'	Report (in German)	Kühne (yellow card) 3'; Röcker 62' (o.g.); Siegert (yellow card) 73'	Stadium: Gazi-Stadion auf der Waldau; Attendance: 710; Referee: Manuel Kunzmann (Bad Hersfeld)

2 March 2013 28	Chemnitzer FC	1–0	VfB Stuttgart II	Chemnitz
14:00 CEST (UTC+01:00)	Pfeffer 54'; Stenzel (yellow card) 78'	Report (in German)	Stöger (yellow card) 58'	Stadium: Stadion an der Gellertstraße; Attendance: 3,950; Referee: Jonas Weickenmeier (Frankfurt)

9 March 2013 29	VfB Stuttgart II	0–2	SV Darmstadt 98	Stuttgart
14:00 CEST (UTC+01:00)	Khedira (yellow card) 69'	Report (in German)	Zimmerman 32' (yellow card) 57'; Baier (yellow card) 66'; Behrens (yellow card) 69'; Ratei (yellow card) 70'; Latza 72'	Stadium: Gazi-Stadion auf der Waldau; Attendance: 610; Referee: Florian Heft (Wietmarschen)

16 March 2013 30	Hansa Rostock	0–0	VfB Stuttgart II	Rostock
14:00 CEST (UTC+01:00)	Leemans (yellow card) 31'; Zimmermann (yellow card) 37'	Report (in German)		Stadium: DKB-Arena; Attendance: 7,300; Referee: Karl Valentin (Taufkirchen)

31 March 2013 31	VfB Stuttgart II	1–1	SV Wehen Wiesbaden	Stuttgart
14:00 CEST (UTC+01:00)	Vitzthum (yellow card) 26' (goal) 48'; Hemlein (yellow card) 52'	Report (in German)	Vunguidica 31'; Müller (yellow card) 42'; Wiemann (yellow card) 54'	Stadium: Gazi-Stadion auf der Waldau; Attendance: 370; Referee: Norbert Giese (Großräschen)

6 April 2013 32	1. FC Heidenheim	1–0	VfB Stuttgart II	Heidenheim
14:00 CEST (UTC+02:00)	Malura (yellow card) 66'; Wittek 87'; Bagceci (yellow card) 90'	Report (in German)	Vitzthum (yellow card) 32'; Hemlein (yellow card) 70'	Stadium: Voith-Arena; Attendance: 8,000; Referee: Thomas Stein (Weibersbrunn)

13 April 2013 33	VfB Stuttgart II	3–0	Hallescher FC	Stuttgart
14:00 CEST (UTC+01:00)	Röcker (yellow card) 42'; Breier 47'; Kiefer (yellow card) 52'; Stöger 56', 74'	Report (in German)	Ruprecht (yellow card) 17'	Stadium: Gazi-Stadion auf der Waldau; Attendance: 680; Referee: Tim Sönder (Kiel)

20 April 2013 34	VfB Stuttgart II	0–0	Wacker Burghausen	Stuttgart
14:00 CEST (UTC+02:00)	Mwene (yellow card) 62'	Report (in German)	Schmidt (yellow card) 56'; Schröck (yellow card) 73'; Schwarz (red card) 88'	Stadium: Gazi-Stadion auf der Waldau; Attendance: 460; Referee: Sebastian Schmickartz (Berlin)

27 April 2013 35	VfL Osnabrück	2–0	VfB Stuttgart II	Osnabrück
14:00 CEST (UTC+02:00)	Zoller 35'; Piossek 73'	Report (in German)	Röcker (yellow card) 17'; Janzer (yellow card) 52'	Stadium: Osnatel-Arena; Attendance: 9,200; Referee: Sören Storks (Velen)

3 May 2013 36	VfB Stuttgart II	0–1	Arminia Bielefeld	Stuttgart
18:00 CEST (UTC+02:00)	Hemlein (yellow card) 10'; Rathgeb (yellow card) 53'; Benyamina (yellow card) 79' (red card)	Report (in German)	Rahn 41'; Schönfeld (yellow card) 89'	Stadium: Gazi-Stadion auf der Waldau; Attendance: 1,100; Referee: Arne Aarnink (Nordhorn)

11 May 2013 37	Alemannia Aachen	4–2	VfB Stuttgart II	Aachen
13:30 CEST (UTC+02:00)	Leipertz 27', 89'; Murakami 57'; Kefkir 73'	Report (in German)	Maletic 65'; Breier 72'	Stadium: Tivoli; Attendance: 8,892; Referee: Lothar Ostheimer (Pfaffenhofen an der Ilm)

18 May 2013 38	VfB Stuttgart II	0–1	Borussia Dortmund II	Stuttgart
13:30 CEST (UTC+02:00)	Vitzthum (yellow card) 34'; Janzer (yellow card) 44'; Gümüs (yellow card) 67'	Report (in German)	Demirbay (yellow card) 25'; Ducksch 55'; Treude (yellow card) 88'	Stadium: Gazi-Stadion auf der Waldau; Attendance: 625; Referee: Christian Leicher (Landshut)

== Squad statistics ==
As of 1 May 2013

No.	Pos	Nat	Player	Total		3. Liga	
No.	Pos	Nat	Player	Apps	Goals	Apps	Goals
Goalkeepers
1	GK	(Greece) GRE	Odisseas Vlachodimos	10	0	10+0	0
12	GK	(Germany) GER	Jonas Wieszt	0	0	0+0	0
	GK	(Germany) GER	André Weis	25	0	25+0	0
Defenders
2	DF	(Italy) ITA	Felice Vecchione	18	0	14+4	0
3	DF	(Germany) GER	Michael Vitzthum	32	2	32+0	2
4	DF	(Germany) GER	Benedikt Röcker	2	0	0+2	0
5	DF	(Germany) GER	Daniel Vier	25	0	16+9	0
6	DF	(Germany) GER	Thomas Geyer	29	0	29+0	0
22	DF	(Germany) GER	Steffen Lang	14	0	12+2	0
23	DF	(Germany) GER	Sebastian Enderle	13	0	10+3	0
26	DF	(Germany) GER	Dominik Gallert	0	0	0+0	0
37	DF	(Austria) AUT	Philipp Mwene	2	0	2+0	0
	DF	(Germany) GER	Antonio Rüdiger	3	2	3+0	2
Midfielders
8	MF	(Germany) GER	Rani Khedira	31	0	31+0	0
10	MF	(Turkey) TUR	Öztürk Karataş	11	0	3+8	0
14	MF	(Germany) GER	Robin Yalçın	3	0	2+1	0
17	MF	(Germany) GER	Tobias Rathgeb	30	4	29+1	4
20	MF	(Germany) GER	Marco Rapp	0	0	0+0	0
21	MF	(United States) USA	Jerome Kiesewetter	7	0	1+6	0
24	MF	(Germany) GER	Manuel Janzer	28	4	23+5	4
25	MF	(Germany) GER	Lukas Kiefer	19	1	12+7	1
27	MF	(Germany) GER	Timo Çeçen	9	0	2+7	0
				0	0	0	0
				0	0	0	0
				0	0	0	0
				0	0	0	0
				0	0	0	0
Forwards
				0	0	0	0
				0	0	0	0
				0	0	0	0
				0	0	0	0
				0	0	0	0
				0	0	0	0
				0	0	0	0
