= 2013–14 VfB Stuttgart II season =

VfB Stuttgart II
2013–14 season
- Stadium: Gazi Stadion, Stuttgart, BW
- 3. Liga: 15th

The 2013–14 VfB Stuttgart II season was the season for the reserve team for VfB Stuttgart. The season began on 20 July 2013 and ended on 10 May 2014. They participated in the 3. Liga.

== Review and events ==
The season began on 20 July 2013 with a loss against Borussia Dortmund II and will end on 10 May 2014 against Chemnitzer FC. They are participating in the 3. Liga.

== Fixtures and results ==
=== Legend ===
Win Draw Loss Postponed

=== 3. Liga ===
==== League fixtures and results ====
| 20 July 2013 1 | Borussia Dortmund II | 1-0 | VfB Stuttgart II | Dortmund |
| 14:00 CEST (UTC+02:00) | Ducksch 53' | Report (in German) | | Stadium: Rote Erde; Attendance: 3,890; Referee: Stefan Glasmacher (Alsdorf) |

| 26 July 2013 2 | VfB Stuttgart II | 1-1 | SV Darmstadt 98 | Stuttgart |
| 19:00 CEST (UTC+02:00) | Riemann 25'; Leibold (yellow card) 55' (yellow card) 69' (red card) | Report (in German) | Heller (yellow card) 30'; Sulu (yellow card) 49'; Stroh-Engel 51' | Stadium: Gazi-Stadion auf der Waldau; Attendance: 910; Referee: Alexander Sather (Grimma) |

| 11 August 2013 3 | Hansa Rostock | 3-1 | VfB Stuttgart II | Rostock |
| 14:00 CEST (UTC+02:00) | Savran 21'; Haas (yellow card) 23'; Radjabali-Fardi (yellow card) 32'; Ioannidis 77'; Blacha 79' | Report (in German) | Rathgeb 23' | Stadium: DKB-Arena; Attendance: 10,500; Referee: Steffen Mix (Abtswind) |

| 16 August 2013 4 | VfB Stuttgart II | 2-0 | 1. FC Saarbrücken | Stuttgart |
| 19:00 CEST (UTC+02:00) | Grüttner 19'; Berko 90' | Report (in German) | Maek (yellow card) 44'; Hoffmann (yellow card) 63' | Stadium: Gazi-Stadion auf der Waldau; Attendance: 950; Referee: Florian Badstübner (Windsbach) |

| 25 August 2013 5 | Stuttgarter Kickers | 0-2 | VfB Stuttgart II | Stuttgart |
| 15:00 CEST (UTC+02:00) | Gerster (yellow card) 36' | Report (in German) | Wanitzek 9'; Kiefer (yellow card) 76'; Vier (yellow card) 78'; Riemann 87' | Stadium: Gazi-Stadion auf der Waldau; Attendance: 4,470; Referee: Knut Kircher (Rottenburg) |

| 30 August 2013 6 | VfB Stuttgart II | 1-2 | Hallescher FC | Stuttgart |
| 18:30 CEST (UTC+02:00) | Grüttner (yellow card) 15' (yellow card) 84' (red card); Wanitzek 52'; Lohkemper (yellow card) 90' | Report (in German) | Zeiger (yellow card) 36'; Zeiger 64'; Furuholm 73' | Stadium: Gazi-Stadion auf der Waldau; Attendance: 620; Referee: Jonas Weickenmeier (Frankfurt) |

| 4 September 2013 7 | Preußen Münster | 1-3 | VfB Stuttgart II | Münster |
| 19:00 CEST (UTC+02:00) | Schmidt (yellow card) 31'; Grote 54'; Kirsch (yellow card) 59'; Bischoff (red card) 90' | Report (in German) | Breier 14'; Vier 36'; Janzer (yellow card) 53'; Kiefer 68' | Stadium: Preußenstadion; Attendance: 7,284; Referee: Robert Schröder (Hannover) |

| 8 September 2013 8 | VfB Stuttgart II | 4-0 | Wacker Burghausen | Stuttgart |
| 14:00 CEST (UTC+02:00) | Khedira 46'; Grüttner 58', 86'; Janzer (yellow card) 67'; Breier 79' | Report (in German) | Thee (yellow card) 15'; Holz (yellow card) 89' | Stadium: Gazi-Stadion auf der Waldau; Attendance: 615; Referee: Bibiana Steinhaus (Hannover) |

| 14 September 2013 9 | RB Leipzig | 3-1 | VfB Stuttgart II | Leipzig |
| 19:00 CEST (UTC+02:00) | Frahn 1'; Röttger (yellow card) 23'; Morys 25'; Hoheneder (yellow card) 31'; Sebastian (yellow card) 40'; Ernst (yellow card) 72'; Schulz 90' | Report (in German) | Wanitzek (yellow card) 57'; Grüttner 86' (yellow card) 90'; Rathgeb (yellow card) 90' | Stadium: Red-Bull-Arena; Attendance: 9,869; Referee: Karl Valentin (Taufkirchen) |

| 21 September 2013 10 | VfB Stuttgart II | 2-1 | Rot-Weiß Erfurt | Stuttgart |
| 14:00 CEST (UTC+02:00) | Grüttner 6'; Kiefer (yellow card) 61'; Janzer 81'; Rathgeb (yellow card) 87' | Report (in German) | Möhwald (yellow card) 43'; Nietfeld 90' | Stadium: Gazi-Stadion auf der Waldau; Attendance: 720; Referee: Thorben Siewer (Drolshagen) |

| 28 September 2013 11 | SV Wehen Wiesbaden | 1-1 | VfB Stuttgart II | Wiesbaden |
| 14:00 CEST (UTC+02:00) | Wolfert (yellow card) 17'; Herzig (yellow card) 19'; Mintzel (yellow card) 61'; Wiemann 90' (pen.) | Report (in German) | Röcker 71'; Halimi (yellow card) 90'; Berko (yellow card) 90' | Stadium: Brita-Arena; Attendance: 3,097; Referee: Alexander Sather (Grimma) |

| 4 October 2013 12 | VfB Stuttgart II | 1-1 | Holstein Kiel | Wiesbaden |
| 19:00 CEST (UTC+02:00) | Berko 8'; Rathgeb (yellow card) 64'; Gümüs (yellow card) 83' | Report (in German) | Herrmann (yellow card) 31'; Hartmann (yellow card) 57'; Siedschlag 68' | Stadium: Brita-Arena; Attendance: 680; Referee: Norbert Giese (Großräschen) |

| 19 October 2013 13 | SV Elversberg | 0-2 | VfB Stuttgart II | Elversberg |
| 14:00 CEST (UTC+02:00) | Bastürk (yellow card) 68' | Report (in German) | Wanitzek (yellow card) 17'; Vier 53'; Gümüs 60'; Lang (yellow card) 74'; Grüttner (yellow card) 81'; Leibold (yellow card) 88' | Stadium: Waldstadion an der Kaiserlinde; Attendance: 1,220; Referee: Steffen Mix (Abtswind) |

| 26 October 2013 14 | VfB Stuttgart II | 1-1 | MSV Duisburg | Stuttgart |
| 14:00 CEST (UTC+02:00) | Rathgeb 17'; Khedira (yellow card) 38' | Report (in German) | Feisthammel 31'; Kühne (yellow card) 56'; Gardawski (yellow card) 88' | Stadium: Gazi-Stadion auf der Waldau; Attendance: 1,200; Referee: Malte Dittrich (Bremen) |

| 1 November 2013 15 | VfB Stuttgart II | 2-1 | VfL Osnabrück | Stuttgart |
| 18:00 CET (UTC+01:00) | Gümüs (yellow card) 32'; Grüttner 71', 81' | [(in German) | Zenga (yellow card) 28'; Blum (yellow card) 44'; Testroet 78'; Wegner (yellow card) 90'; Karikari (yellow card) 90' | Stadium: Gazi-Stadion auf der Waldau; Attendance: 710; Referee: Marcel Unger (Halle (Saale)) |

| 9 November 2013 16 | SpVgg Unterhaching | 4-0 | VfB Stuttgart II | Unterhaching |
| 14:00 CET (UTC+01:00) | Schwarz 29'; Erb 47'; Haberer 55'; Köpke 88' | Report(in German) | | Stadium: Alpenbauer Sportpark; Attendance: 1,410; Referee: Norbert Giese (Großräschen) |

| 23 November 2013 17 | VfB Stuttgart II | 0-3 | 1. FC Heidenheim | Stuttgart |
| 14:00 CET (UTC+01:00) | | Report (in German) | Schnatterer 12'; Morabit (yellow card) 22' (goal) 76'; Mayer 48'; Strauß (yellow card) 87' | Stadium: Gazi-Stadion auf der Waldau; Attendance: 1,530; Referee: Arne Aarnink (Nordhorn) |

| 14 December 2013 20 | SV Darmstadt 98 | 1-0 | VfB Stuttgart II | Darmstadt |
| 14:00 CET (UTC+01:00) | Stroh-Engel 21' (yellow card) 76'; Sailer (yellow card) 41'; Sulu (red card) 45' | Report (in German) | Grüttner (yellow card) 32'; Janzer (yellow card) 42'; Mwene (yellow card) 58'; Cecen (yellow card) 73'; Lang (yellow card) 82'; Halimi (yellow card) 87' | Stadium: Stadion am Böllenfalltor; Attendance: 4,200; Referee: Marcel Göpferich (Bad Schönborn) |

| 18 December 2013 21 | VfB Stuttgart II | 1-2 | Borussia Dortmund II | Stuttgart |
| 19:00 CET (UTC+01:00) | Janzer 84'; Rathgeb (yellow card) 85' | Report (in German) | Bajner 55', 71' | Stadium: Gazi-Stadion auf der Waldau; Attendance: 920; Referee: Thomas Stein (Weibersbrun) |

| 24 January 2014 22 | VfB Stuttgart II | 4-1 | Hansa Rostock | Stuttgart |
| 19:00 CET (UTC+01:00) | Wanitzek (yellow card) 40'; Breier 61'; Leibold (yellow card) 67'; Riemann 73' (pen.) 90' (yellow card) 87'; Janzer 77' | Report (in German) | Plat 14'; Peković (yellow card) 27'; Ioannidis (yellow card) 90' | Stadium: Gazi-Stadion auf der Waldau; Attendance: 1,400; Referee: Sven Jablonski (Bremen) |

| 1 February 2014 23 | 1. FC Saarbrücken | 0-1 | VfB Stuttgart II | Saarbrücken |
| 14:00 CET (UTC+01:00) | Korte (yellow card) 24'; Marque (yellow card) 49' | Report (in German) | Riemann 50' (pen.) | Stadium: Ludwigsparkstadion; Attendance: 3,159; Referee: Karl Valentin (Taufkirchen) |

| 9 February 2014 24 | VfB Stuttgart II | 0-1 | Stuttgarter Kickers | Stuttgart |
| 15:30 CET (UTC+01:00) | Breier (yellow card) 69'; Riemann (yellow card) 90' | Report (in German) | Calamita 47'; Soriano (yellow card) 79' | Stadium: Gazi-Stadion auf der Waldau; Attendance: 3,900; Referee: Peter Sippel (München) |

| 15 February 2014 25 | Hallescher FC | 3-2 | VfB Stuttgart II | Halle |
| 14:00 CET (UTC+01:00) | Bertram 11' (pen.) 21' (pen.) (yellow card) 84'; Sembolo 53'; Ziebig (yellow card) 90' | Report (in German) | Grüttner 5' (yellow card) 13'; Halimi 63' | Stadium: Erdgas-Sportpark; Attendance: 6,366; Referee: Thorben Siewer (Drolshagen) |

| 21 February 2014 26 | VfB Stuttgart II | 0-0 | Preußen Münster | Stuttgart |
| 19:00CET (UTC+01:00) | Mwene (yellow card) 54'; Rathgeb (yellow card) 87' | Report (in German) | Masuch (red card) 67'; Schmidt (yellow card) 77'; Grote (yellow card) 90' | Stadium: Gazi-Stadion auf der Waldau; Attendance: 650; Referee: Marcel Göpferich (Bad Schönborn) |

| 1 March 2014 27 | Wacker Burghausen | 2-2 | VfB Stuttgart II | Burghausen |
| 14:00 CET (UTC+01:00) | Schröck 49'; Burkhard 58' (pen.); Hefele (yellow card) 63'; Pflügler (yellow card) 71'; Hauk (yellow card) 90' | Report (in German) | Grüttner 44'; Breier 45'; Mwene (yellow card) 58'; Funk (yellow card) 66'; Gümüş (yellow card) 90' | Stadium: Wacker-Arena; Attendance: 1,870; Referee: Marcel Unger (Halle) |

| 7 March 2014 28 | VfB Stuttgart II | 0-2 | RasenBallsport Leipzig | Stuttgart |
| 19:00 CET (UTC+01:00) | Leibold (yellow card) 53'; Grüttner (yellow card) 70' | Report (in German) | Frahn 28'; Poulsen 63'; Kaiser (yellow card) 79'; Franke (yellow card) 90'; Röttger (yellow card) 90' | Stadium: Gazi-Stadion auf der Waldau; Attendance: 1,300; Referee: Steffen Mix (Abtswind) |

| 15 March 2014 29 | Rot-Weiß Erfurt | 4-2 | VfB Stuttgart II | Erfurt |
| 14:00 CET (UTC+01:00) | Odak (yellow card) 13'; Strangl 14'; Kammlott 45', 75'; Möhwald 47' (yellow card) 70'; Pfingsten-Reddig (yellow card) 90' | Report (in German) | Breier 6'; Leibold (yellow card) 30'; Janzer 66' | Stadium: Steigerwaldstadion; Attendance: 3,702; Referee: Jonas Weickenmeier (Frankfurt) |

| 21 March 2014 30 | VfB Stuttgart II | 1-2 | SV Wehen Wiesbaden | Stuttgart |
| 19:00 CET (UTC+01:00) | Didavi (yellow card) 26'; Wanitzek 35'; Grüttner (yellow card) 38'; Funk (yellow card) 89' | Report (in German) | Vunguidica 15'; Mann (yellow card) 64'; Schnellbacher 78' | Stadium: Gazi-Stadion auf der Waldau; Attendance: 510; Referee: Karl Valentin (Taufkirchen) |

| 26 March 2014 31 | Holstein Kiel | 3-0 | VfB Stuttgart II | Kiel |
| 19:00 CET (UTC+01:00) | Hartmann 26'; Wetter 45', 72'; Danneberg (yellow card) 80' | Report (in German) | Yalçın (yellow card) 14'; Leibold (yellow card) 49'; Grüttner (yellow card) 61'; Berko (yellow card) 72' | Stadium: Holstein-Stadion; Attendance: 4,912; Referee: Florian Badstübner (Windsbach) |

| 30 March 2014 32 | VfB Stuttgart II | 2-1 | SV Elversberg | Stuttgart |
| 14:00 CET (UTC+01:00) | Werner 17'; Mwene (yellow card) 43'; Funk (yellow card) 61'; Breier 78' | Summary | Luz (yellow card) 19'; Gross (yellow card) 30'; Funk 86' (o.g.) | Stadium: Gazi-Stadion auf der Waldau; Attendance: 550; Referee: (Germany) Alexander Sather |

| 4 April 2014 33 | MSV Duisburg | 0-0 | VfB Stuttgart II | Duisburg |
| 19:00 CEST (UTC+02:00) | Bajić (yellow card) 21' | Summary | Janzer (yellow card) 33'; Riemann (yellow card) 51'; Mwene (yellow card) 65' | Stadium: Schauinsland-Reisen-Arena; Attendance: 11,296; Referee: (Germany) Marcel Göpferich |

| 12 April 2014 34 | VfL Osnabrück | 3-0 | VfB Stuttgart II | Osnabrück |
| 14:00 CEST (UTC+02:00) | Breier 41' (o.g.); Testroet 53'; Nagy 61' | Summary | Khedira (yellow card) 65'; Leibold (yellow card) 87' | Stadium: Osnatel-Arena; Attendance: 8,059; Referee: (Germany) Soren Storks |

| 19 April 2014 35 | VfB Stuttgart II | 3-2 | SpVgg Unterhaching | Stuttgart |
| 14:00 CEST (UTC+02:00) | Breier 52', 77'; Janzer 70' (yellow card) 84'; Grüttner (yellow card) 75' | Summary | Hack (yellow card) 53'; Haberer (yellow card) 57'; Voglsammer (yellow card) 58' (goal) 59'; Hummels 77'; Erb (yellow card) 82'; Hufnagel (yellow card) 90+4' | Stadium: Gazi-Stadion auf der Waldau; Attendance: 935; Referee: (Germany) Norbert Giese |

| 26 April 2014 36 | 1. FC Heidenheim | 0-1 | VfB Stuttgart II | Heidenheim |
| 14:00 CEST (UTC+02:00) | Göhlert (yellow card) 46'; Wittek | Report (in German) | Baumgartl 49' | Stadium: Voith-Arena; Attendance: 11,500; Referee: Patrick Alt (Heusweiler) |

| 3 May 2014 37 | VfB Stuttgart II | 1-1 | Jahn Regensburg | Stuttgart |
| 13:30 CEST (UTC+02:00) | Geyer 24' (pen.) | Report (in German) | Hendl (yellow card) 32'; J.P. Müller (yellow card) 39' (goal) 66'; M. Müller (yellow card) 52'; Aosman (yellow card) 71' | Stadium: Gazi-Stadion auf der Waldau; Attendance: 430; Referee: Stefan Glasmacher (Alsdorf) |

| 10 May 2014 38 | Chemnitzer FC | 0-0 | VfB Stuttgart II | Chemnitz |
| 13:30 CEST (UTC+02:00) | | Report (in German) | | Stadium: Stadion an der Gellertstraße; Attendance: 4,562; Referee: Steffen Mix (Abtswind) |
