= 2011–12 VfB Stuttgart season =

VfB Stuttgart
2011–12 season
- Manager: Bruno Labbadia
- Bundesliga: 6th
- DFB-Pokal: Quarter-finals
- Top goalscorer: League: Martin Harnik (17); All: Martin Harnik (17)
Home colours	Away colours	Third colours

The 2011–12 VfB Stuttgart season was the 119th season in the club's football history. They competed in the Bundesliga, the top tier of German football, in which they finished 6th as well as competing in the DFB-Pokal, where they were eliminated in the quarter-finals. It was Stuttgart's 35th consecutive season in the league, since having been promoted from the 2. Bundesliga in 1977.

== Season summary ==
Stuttgart finished 6th in Bundesliga, and as a result, qualified for the Europa League. They were eliminated in the quarter-finals of the DFB-Pokal by Bayern Munich.

== Players ==
=== First-team squad ===
Squad at end of season

Note: Flags indicate national team as defined under FIFA eligibility rules; some limited exceptions apply. Players may hold more than one non-FIFA nationality.

No.	Pos.	Nation	Player
1	GK	GER	Sven Ulreich
2	DF	JPN	Gōtoku Sakai (Note: Sakai was born in New York City, New York, United States, but was raised in Japan from the age of 2 and represented them at U-20 and U-23 level before making his international debut for Japan in September 2012.) (on loan from Albirex Niigata)
3	DF	ITA	Cristian Molinaro
4	MF	DEN	William Kvist
5	DF	GER	Serdar Tasci (captain)
6	DF	GER	Georg Niedermeier
7	MF	AUT	Martin Harnik (Note: Harnik was born in Hamburg, West Germany (now Germany), but also qualified to represent Austria internationally through his father and represented them at U-19, U-20 and U-21 level before making his international debut for Austria in August 2007.)
8	MF	SRB	Zdravko Kuzmanović (Note: Kuzmanović was born in Thun, Switzerland, and represented them at U-21 level, but also qualified to represent Serbia internationally through his parents and made his international debut for Serbia in March 2007.)
9	FW	BIH	Vedad Ibišević
11	FW	FRA	Johan Audel
13	MF	GER	Timo Gebhart
14	DF	MEX	Francisco Javier Rodríguez
15	DF	CIV	Arthur Boka
16	MF	GUI	Ibrahima Traoré (Note: Traoré was born in Villepinte, France, but also qualified to represent Guinea internationally and made his international debut for Guinea in August 2010.)
17	DF	FRA	Matthieu Delpierre

No.	Pos.	Nation	Player
18	FW	GER	Cacau (Note: Cacau was born in Santo André, Brazil, but acquired German citizenship through residency in 2009 and made his international debut for Germany in May 2009.)
20	MF	GER	Christian Gentner
21	DF	NED	Khalid Boulahrouz
22	GK	GER	Marc Ziegler
23	FW	GER	Julian Schieber
24	MF	GUI	Mamadou Bah
26	MF	AUT	Raphael Holzhauser
27	DF	GER	Stefano Celozzi
28	MF	HUN	Tamás Hajnal
30	DF	GER	Antonio Rüdiger
31	FW	JPN	Shinji Okazaki
34	DF	GER	Patrick Bauer
35	GK	GER	André Weis
36	MF	GER	Christoph Hemlein

=== Left club during season ===
Note: Flags indicate national team as defined under FIFA eligibility rules; some limited exceptions apply. Players may hold more than one non-FIFA nationality.

No.	Pos.	Nation	Player
29	FW	RUS	Pavel Pogrebnyak (to Fulham)
30	GK	GER	Bernd Leno (to Bayer Leverkusen)

No.	Pos.	Nation	Player
38	DF	BIH	Ermin Bičakčić (to Eintracht Braunschweig)

== Competitions ==
=== Overview ===
Competition	First match	Last match	Starting round	Final position	Record							
Competition	First match	Last match	Starting round	Final position	Pld	W	D	L	GF	GA	GD	Win %
Bundesliga	6 August 2011	5 May 2012	Matchday 1	8th	34	15	8	11	63	46	+17	44.12
DFB-Pokal	29 July 2011	8 February 2012	First round	Quarter-finals	4	3	0	1	7	4	+3	75.00
Total					38	18	8	12	70	50	+20	47.37

Last updated: complete
Source: Competitions

=== Bundesliga ===
==== League table ====
Pos	Team	Pld	W	D	L	GF	GA	GD	Pts	Qualification or relegation
4	Borussia Mönchengladbach	34	17	9	8	49	24	+25	60	Qualification to Champions League play-off round
5	Bayer Leverkusen	34	15	9	10	52	44	+8	54	Qualification to Europa League group stage (Note: The 2011–12 DFB-Pokal champions (Borussia Dortmund) and runners-up (Bayern Munich) qualified for the 2012–13 UEFA Champions League, thus the three Europa League places were distributed through league positions.)
6	VfB Stuttgart	34	15	8	11	63	46	+17	53	Qualification to Europa League play-off round
7	Hannover 96	34	12	12	10	41	45	−4	48	Qualification to Europa League third qualifying round
8	VfL Wolfsburg	34	13	5	16	47	60	−13	44	

Source: kicker
Rules for classification: 1) points; 2) goal difference; 3) number of goals scored.

=== DFB-Pokal ===
29 July 2011 First round	Wehen Wiesbaden	1–2	VfB Stuttgart	Wiesbaden
20:30 CEST	Janjić 28' (pen.)	Report	6' Bičakčić; 50' Kuzmanović	Stadium: BRITA-Arena; Attendance: 11,600; Referee: Robert Hartmann

26 October 2011 Second round	VfB Stuttgart	3–0	FSV Frankfurt	Stuttgart
20:30 CEST	Hemlein 4'; Cacau 38'; Traoré 89'	Report		Stadium: Mercedes-Benz Arena; Attendance: 18,270; Referee: Christian Leicher

21 December 2011 Round of 16	VfB Stuttgart	2–1	Hamburger SV	Stuttgart
20:30 CET	Cacau 23', 62'	Report	54' (o.g.) Kvist	Stadium: Mercedes-Benz Arena; Attendance: 38,600; Referee: Peter Gagelmann

8 February 2012 Quarter-finals	VfB Stuttgart	0–2	Bayern Munich	Stuttgart
20:30 CET		Report	30' Ribéry; 46' Gómez	Stadium: Mercedes-Benz Arena; Attendance: 57,500; Referee: Florian Meyer
