= Rathgeb =

Rathgeb is a surname. Notable people with the surname include:

- Isabell Rathgeb (born 1980), German politician
- Jorge Rathgeb (born 1967), Chilean politician
- Tobias Rathgeb (born 1982), German footballer
- Yannick Rathgeb (born 1995), Swiss ice hockey player
