= Herbert Scurla =

German writer and academic

Herbert Scurla (21 April 1905, Großräschen – 7 April 1981, Kolkwitz) was a German writer and academic.

== Biography ==
Herbert Scurla was born in 1905 in Großräschen, Brandenburg. He studied law and economics in Berlin, Germany. Scurla joined the Nazi Party in May 1933, as well as other Nazi organisations. Throughout the 1930s, Scurla worked for the German Office of University Exchanges, which in 1934 became the Ministry of Education of the Reich. In the 1930s and 1940s, he lived and taught in Turkey between 1937 and 1939 in order to expand the impact of German universities. He escaped the incorporation into the Wehrmacht. In 1945, Scurla became an apprentice joiner and three years later, in the Soviet zone, becoming a member of the National Democratic Party (Nationaldemokratische Partei Deutschlands, NDPD) which "recycled" former Nazis. Beginning in 1952, he lived in Cottbus, Germany and became a writer. He published biographies and travel books which gained success. He was very active in the East German cultural milieu.

He died in 1981 in Cottbus. A specialist in dissimulation, Scurla often used pseudonyms and while well known as a former Nazi, he lived in the Soviet occupied zone (1945–1949) of East Germany (1949–1990) without problems.

== Distinctions ==
Herbert Scurla was decorated in 1974 with the Vaterländischer Verdienstorden.

== Bibliography ==
- Dirk Halm and Faruk Sen (Ed.), Exil sous le croissant et l'étoile. Rapport d'Herbert Scurla sur l'activité des universitaires allemands pendant le IIIe Reich, éditions Turquoise, Paris, 2009
