= Wehrda =

- Borough of Marburg
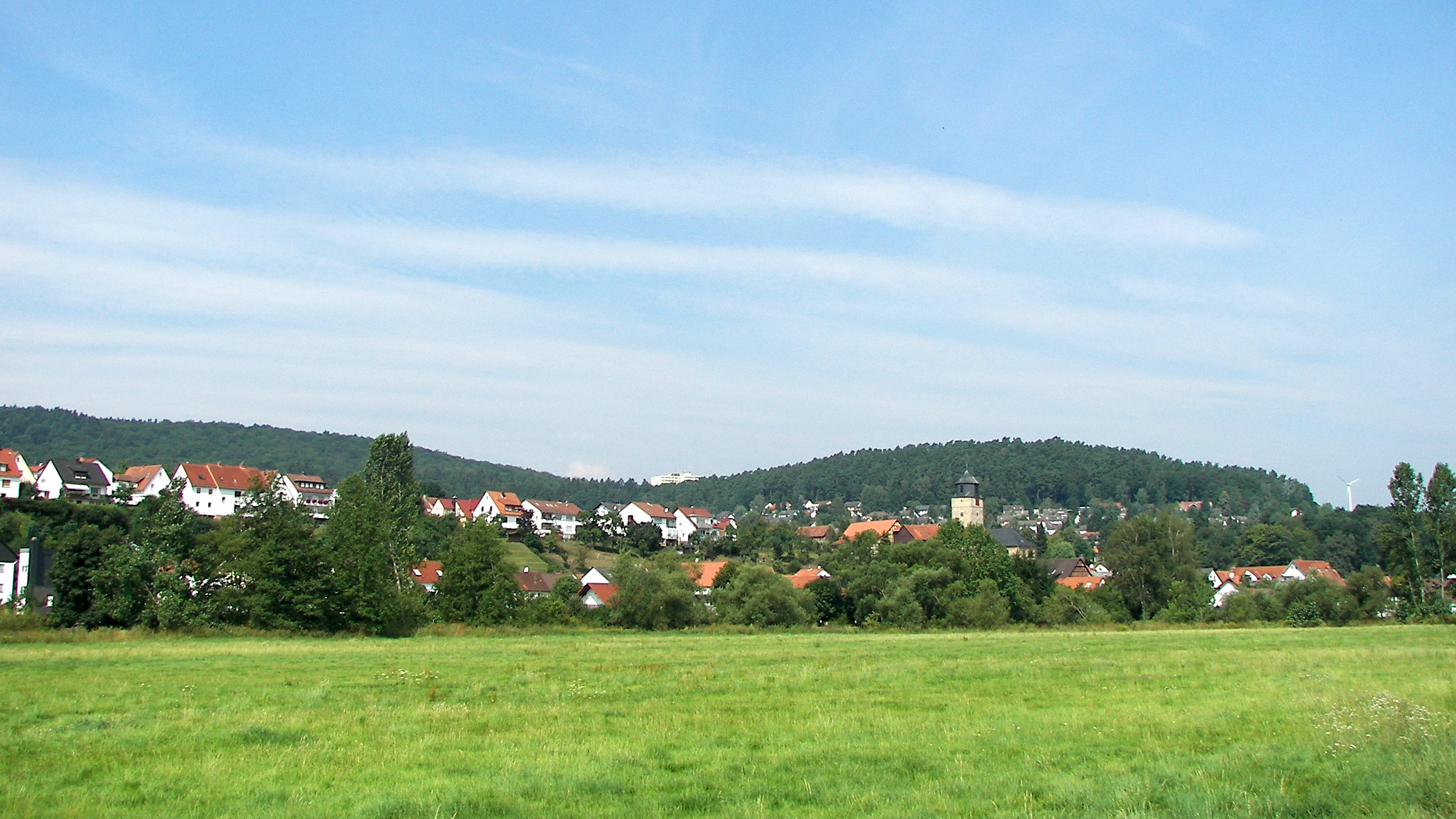
- Wehrda

- Coat of arms

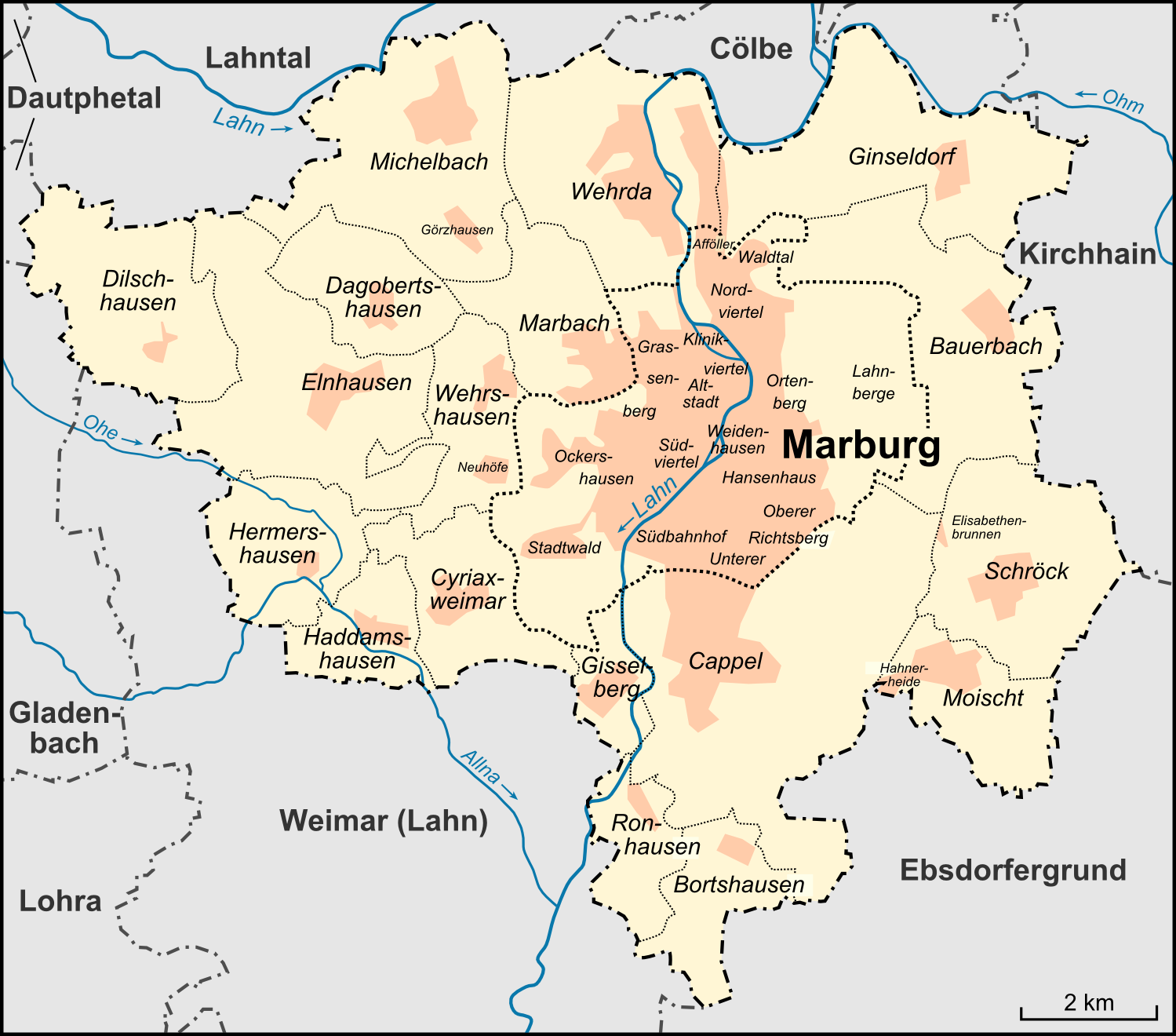
- Stadtteile of Marburg
- Interactive map of Wehrda
- Location within Germany Location within Hesse
- Coordinates: 50°50′10″N 8°45′37″E
- Country: Germany
- State: Hesse
- District: Marburg-Biedenkopf
- City: Marburg

Area
  - Total: 8.12 km^{2} (3.14 sq mi)
- Elevation: 199 m (653 ft)

Population (2019-12-31)
  - Total: 5,929
  - Density: 730/km^{2} (1,890/sq mi)
- Time zone: UTC+01:00 (CET)
  - Summer (DST): UTC+02:00 (CEST)
- Postal codes: 35041
- Dialling codes: 06421
- Website: www.marburg-wehrda.de

Wehrda (German pronunciation: [ˈveːɐ̯da]) is a borough (Ortsbezirk) of Marburg in Hesse.
