= Michael Vitzthum =

German footballer

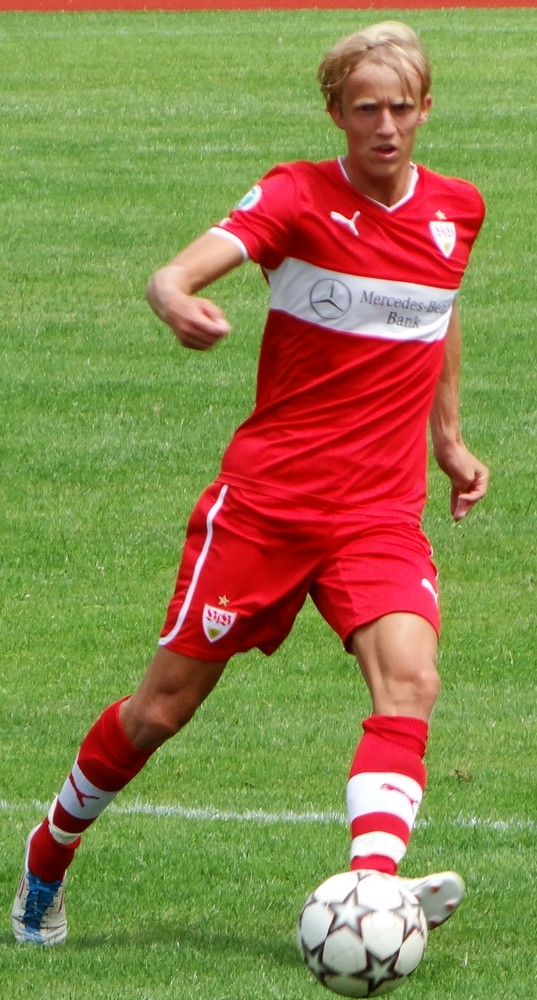
- Vitzthum playing for VfB Stuttgart II

Personal information
- Full name: Michael Vitzthum
- Date of birth: 20 June 1992 (age 34)
- Place of birth: Bad Tölz, Germany
- Height: 1.85 m (6 ft 1 in)
- Position: Left back

Youth career
- 1995–2001: SV Warngau
- 2001–2010: Bayern Munich

Senior career*
Years	Team	Apps	(Gls)
2010–2011	SpVgg Unterhaching II	12	(0)
2010–2012	SpVgg Unterhaching	47	(1)
2012–2014	VfB Stuttgart II	35	(2)
2013	VfB Stuttgart	0	(0)
2013–2014	→ Karlsruher SC (loan)	11	(1)
2014–2015	1. FC Heidenheim	3	(0)
2015–2017	Wehen Wiesbaden	31	(1)
2017–2020	Sonnenhof Großaspach	49	(4)

International career
2009	Germany U18	2	(0)
2013	Germany U21	4	(0)
- * Club domestic league appearances and goals

Michael Vitzthum (born 20 June 1992) is a German former footballer who played as a left back in the youth teams of Bayern Munich, before leaving to join SpVgg Unterhaching in 2010. That October, he made his professional debut as a substitute for Roman Tyce in a 1–1 draw with Kickers Offenbach.

For the 2012–13 season Vitzthum moved to VfB Stuttgart II. He was loaned out to Karlsruher SC from July 2013 to June 2014 after his contract with VfB Stuttgart was extended.

For the 2014–15 season Vitzthum moved to 1. FC Heidenheim.
