= Timo Çeçen =

German footballer

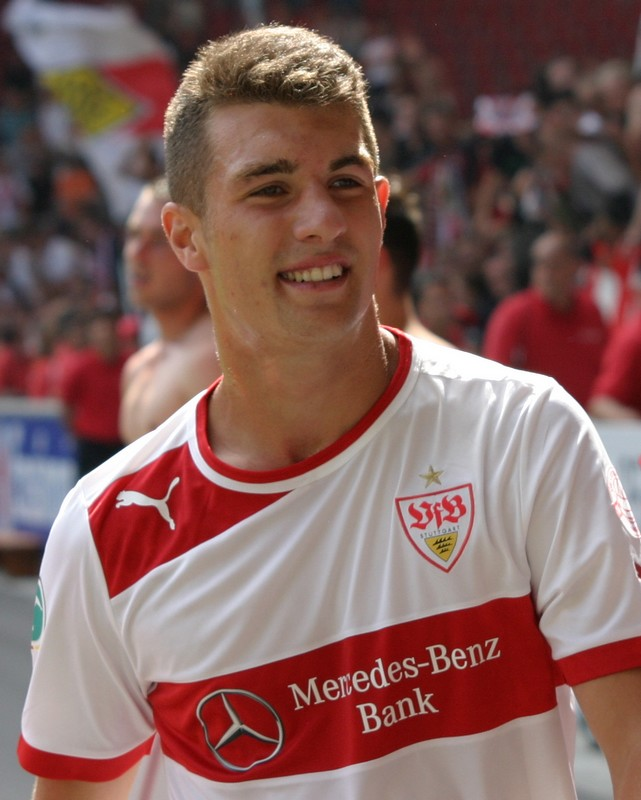
- Çeçen with VfB Stuttgart II in 2012

Personal information
- Date of birth: 17 May 1994 (age 32)
- Place of birth: Wehrda, Germany
- Height: 1.80 m (5 ft 11 in)
- Position: Midfielder

Team information
- Current team: TSV Eintracht Stadtallendorf
- Number: 28

Youth career
- JSG Lohra
- TSG Wieseck
- –2009: Eintracht Frankfurt
- 2009–2012: VfB Stuttgart

Senior career*
Years	Team	Apps	(Gls)
2012–2015	VfB Stuttgart II	32	(1)
2015–2016	Chemnitzer FC II	8	(0)
2015–2016	Chemnitzer FC	12	(0)
2016–2017	FC 08 Homburg	49	(13)
2017–2018	Teutonia Watzenborn-Steinberg	31	(15)
2018–2020	FC Gießen	53	(13)
2020–2021	Türkgücü Friedberg	1	(0)
2021–	TSV Eintracht Stadtallendorf	39	(17)

International career
2009	Germany U15	2	(0)
2009–2010	Germany U16	7	(0)
2010	Germany U17	4	(0)
2012	Germany U18	1	(0)
2012	Germany U19	2	(0)
- * Club domestic league appearances and goals as of 19 November 2022

Timo Çeçen (born 17 May 1994) is a German footballer who plays as a midfielder for TSV Eintracht Stadtallendorf.

== Club career ==
Çeçen was born in Wehrda. He made his debut for VfB Stuttgart II in the Mercedes-Benz Arena on 4 August 2012 in the 3. Liga in a 2–0 victory against Karlsruher SC.

On 28 January 2015, Çeçen moved to Chemnitzer FC.

== International career ==
On 21 May 2009, Çeçen made his first appearance for the national under-15 team of Germany against the USA. He played for the German national under-17 team in the 2011 UEFA European Under-17 Championship qualifying round Group 2 on 17 October 2010 against Bosnia and Herzegovina and on 20 October 2010 against Austria. In the 2013 UEFA European Under-19 Football Championship qualification Group 5 Çeçen appeared in the matches on 11 October 2012 against Macedonia and on 16 October 2012 against Ireland.

== Personal life ==
Çeçen was born to a Turkish father of Chechen descent and a Spanish and Italian mother.
