= Antonio Rüdiger =

German footballer (born 1993)

- Rüdiger with Germany in 2026

Personal information
- Full name: Antonio Rüdiger
- Date of birth: 3 March 1993 (age 33)
- Place of birth: Berlin, Germany
- Height: 1.90 m (6 ft 3 in)
- Position: Centre-back

Team information
- Current team: Real Madrid
- Number: 22

Youth career
- 2000–2002: VfB Sperber Neukölln
- 2002–2005: SV Tasmania Berlin
- 2005–2006: Neuköllner Sportfreunde 1907
- 2006–2008: Hertha Zehlendorf
- 2008–2011: Borussia Dortmund
- 2011–2012: VfB Stuttgart

Senior career*
Years	Team	Apps	(Gls)
2011–2015	VfB Stuttgart II	22	(3)
2012–2016	VfB Stuttgart	66	(2)
2015–2016	→ Roma (loan)	30	(2)
2016–2017	Roma	26	(0)
2017–2022	Chelsea	133	(9)
2022–	Real Madrid	117	(4)

International career
2010–2011	Germany U18	8	(4)
2011–2012	Germany U19	14	(1)
2012	Germany U20	2	(0)
2012–2014	Germany U21	10	(1)
2014–2026	Germany	86	(3)
Medal record
Men's football
Representing Germany
FIFA Confederations Cup
Winner	2017 Russia
- * Club domestic league appearances and goals as of 21:00, 10 October 2026 (UTC)

Antonio Rüdiger (Note: German pronunciation: [anˈtoːni̯o ˈʁyːdiɡɐ]) (born 3 March 1993) is a German professional footballer who plays as a centre-back for La Liga club Real Madrid. He is known for his aggressive playing style, speed, tackling ability and strong aerial presence.

Rüdiger began his career at VfB Stuttgart, representing their reserves in 3. Liga and the first team in the Bundesliga. In 2015 he joined Roma, initially on loan and a year later for a €9 million fee. He was signed by Chelsea in 2017 for an estimated £27 million, where he won the FA Cup in his first season, followed by the UEFA Europa League in his second season, and the UEFA Champions League in 2021. In 2022, he was signed by Real Madrid, winning a Copa del Rey in his first season, as well as La Liga and a second Champions League title in 2024.

Rüdiger made his international debut for Germany national team in May 2014. He was forced to miss UEFA Euro 2016 due to an injury suffered earlier in the season, but he was part of the squad that won the 2017 FIFA Confederations Cup. He later also took part at three FIFA World Cups (in 2018, 2022 and 2026) and two UEFA European Championships (in 2020 and 2024).

== Club career ==
=== VfB Stuttgart ===
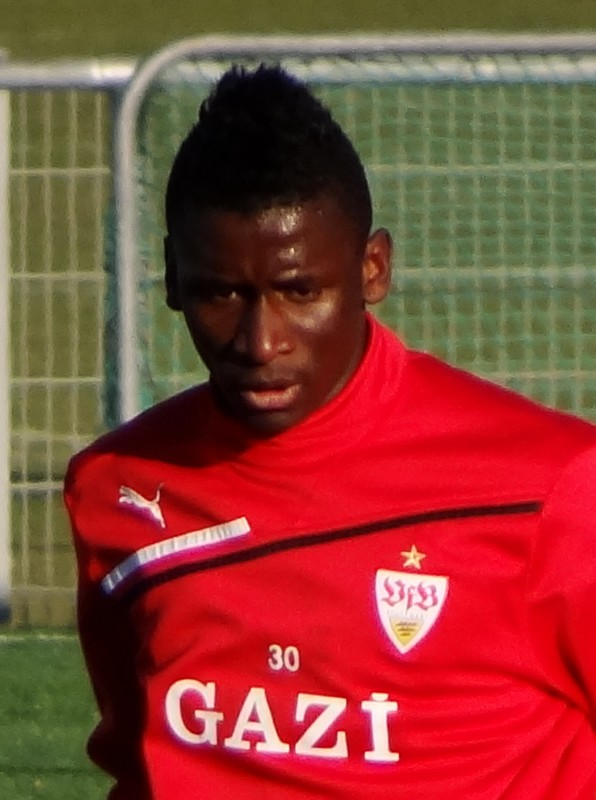
Rüdiger with VfB Stuttgart in 2012

On 23 July 2011, Rüdiger made his debut for VfB Stuttgart II in the 3. Liga against Arminia Bielefeld. Subsequently on 29 January 2012, Rüdiger made his Bundesliga debut for VfB Stuttgart's first team in a home professional match against Borussia Mönchengladbach, he was replaced by Raphael Holzhauser in the 79th minute of a 3–0 defeat.

The following year in April 2013, Rüdiger extended his contract with Stuttgart until June 2017. On 1 June, he played in the final of the DFB-Pokal in a match lost 3–2 against Bayern Munich. He finished his second season in the first team with 24 appearances, plus 4 appearances and 2 goals in the reserve team.

Rüdiger finished the 2013–14 season with 35 appearances and 2 goals. He finished the following season with only 20 appearances and one assist due to various injuries.

=== Roma ===
On 19 August 2015, Serie A club Roma signed Rüdiger on loan from Stuttgart for €4 million. The clubs agreed on an optional €9 million transfer fee at the end of the one-year contract.

On 12 September, he made his debut in a 2–0 away win over Frosinone. On 9 January 2016 he scored his first goal for Roma in the 4th minute of a 1–1 home draw against Milan. He finished his season-long loan to Roma with 37 appearances and 2 goals. On 30 May, Roma officially signed Rüdiger from Stuttgart for €9 million + €0.5m bonuses on a four-year contract.

On 23 February 2017, as a substitute replacing Kostas Manolas in the 46th minute of a 1–0 home defeat against Villarreal in the round of 32 of the UEFA Europa League, he was sent off with a double yellow card in the 81st minute. On 30 April he was sent off with a red card in the 93rd minute in Derby della Capitale against Lazio in a 3–1 home defeat. Rüdiger finished his second season at Roma with 35 appearances and four assists.

=== Chelsea ===
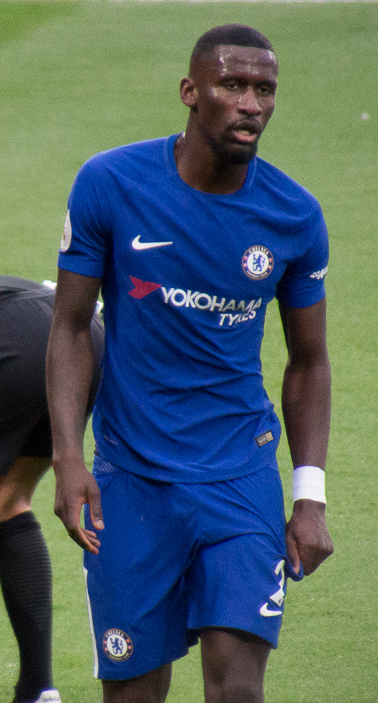
Rüdiger playing for Chelsea in 2017

On 9 July 2017, Rüdiger joined Chelsea from Roma for a reported initial fee of £29 million on a five-year deal. He was given the number 2 shirt. He made his debut on 6 August as a substitute replacing Marcos Alonso in the 79th minute in a 4–1 loss on penalties to Arsenal in the 2017 FA Community Shield. He made his Premier League debut six days later in a 3–2 defeat against Burnley at Stamford Bridge. He scored his first goal for Chelsea in the round of 16 of the EFL Cup in a 2–1 win over Everton, and his first league goal was the only one of a home win over Swansea City on 29 November 2017. On 20 October 2018, Rüdiger scored his first goal of the season, opening the scoring in a 2–2 home draw against Manchester United.

On 22 December 2019, Rüdiger made a complaint about racist abuse directed against him during the away match against Tottenham Hotspur, which received wide media coverage. It prompted a call for government action on racism in football. However, no evidence of racist abuse against Rüdiger was found after a police investigation with the police eventually dismissing the case.

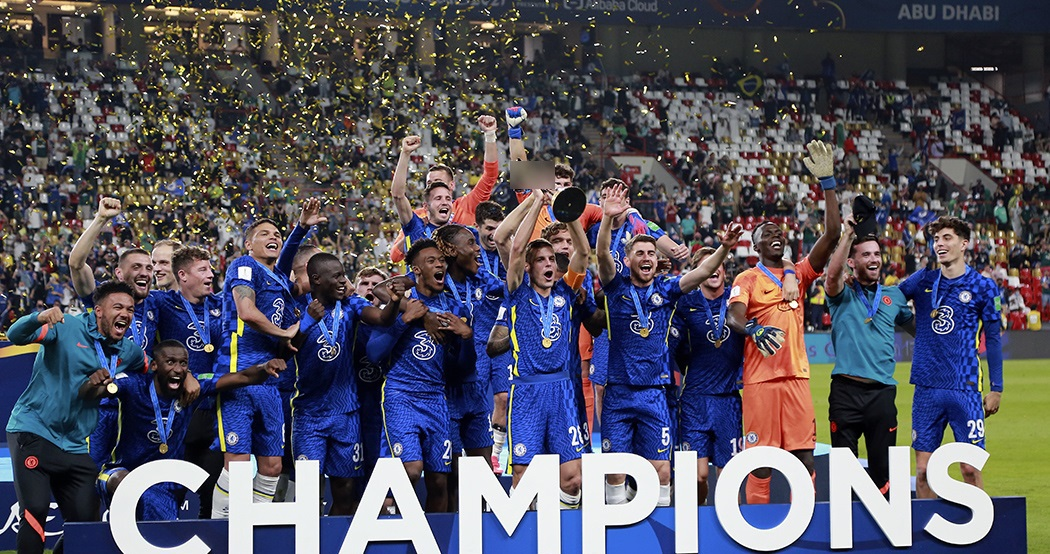
Rüdiger (second from bottom left) celebrating after winning the 2021 FIFA Club World Cup with Chelsea in 2021

On his 100th club appearance, he scored Chelsea's two goals, both headers assisted by Mason Mount in a 2–2 draw against Leicester City at the King Power Stadium on 1 February 2020. On 29 May 2021, Rüdiger won his first-ever UEFA Champions League after Chelsea beat Manchester City 1–0 in the final at the Estádio do Dragão. On 12 April 2022, he scored his first Champions League goal in a 3–2 away win over Real Madrid in the quarter-finals of the 2021–22 season; however, Chelsea were eliminated from the competition by losing 5–4 on aggregate. On 20 May, Rüdiger announced officially that he would leave Chelsea after five years.

=== Real Madrid ===
On 2 June 2022, Real Madrid announced that Rüdiger signed as a free agent for the club, penning a four-year deal starting with the 2022–23 season. On 20 June 2022, Rüdiger was unveiled as a new Real Madrid player. He was given the number 22 shirt. On 10 August, he made his debut for the club, coming off the bench in a 2–0 victory over Eintracht Frankfurt in the UEFA Super Cup. His first goal came on 11 September 2022, scoring the last goal in a 4–1 win over Mallorca. On 11 October, he scored a header in the 95th minute against Shakhtar Donetsk in the Champions League group stage, which allowed his side to draw 1–1 and qualify for the knockout phase. While jumping for the header, Rüdiger collided with Shakhtar goalkeeper Anatoliy Trubin and sustained a cut to the face that required 20 stitches. In the 2023–24 season, he achieved his first La Liga and second Champions League title, in which he was named in the Team of the Season for the latter. On 1 April 2025, he scored the decisive goal against Real Sociedad during extra time, securing his team's place in the Copa del Rey final with a 5–4 aggregate victory. On 27 April during the 2–3 Copa del Rey final defeat to Barcelona, Rüdiger received a red card on the bench after continuously attempting to threaten a referee after a controversial challenge including throwing an object, and he was continuously held back by his teammates. Rüdiger's actions were heavily condemned, and he was ultimately handed a six-match ban.

On 16 June 2026, Rüdiger extended his contract until 2027.

== International career ==
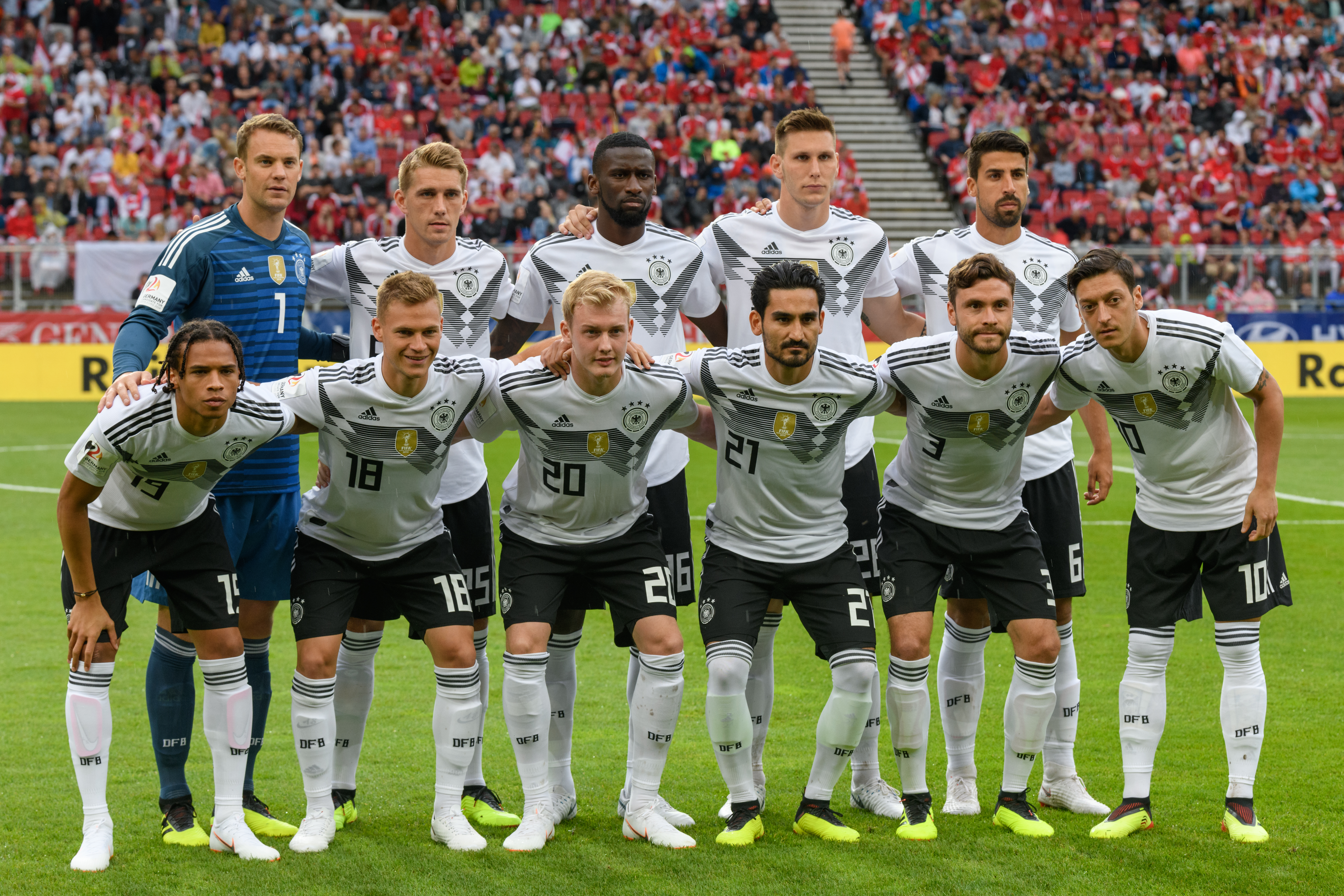
Rüdiger (top row, middle) lined up for Germany in 2018

Rüdiger was eligible to play for Germany and Sierra Leone, his mother's homeland and was a member of several German national youth football teams up to the Germany U21 team.

He made his debut for the Germany national team on 13 May 2014 in a 0–0 draw against Poland. Although he was initially included in his nation's 23-man squad for UEFA Euro 2016, Rüdiger was later ruled out of the tournament due to injury, after tearing the anterior cruciate ligament in his right knee during a training session on 7 June. Rüdiger was part of the Germany national squad which won the 2017 FIFA Confederations Cup in Russia. He played four matches in the tournament, including the 1–0 win over Chile in the final. On 8 October 2017, he headed his first international goal in a 5–1 home win over Azerbaijan in World Cup qualifying.

Rüdiger was included in Germany's final 23-man squad for the 2018 FIFA World Cup on 4 June 2018. On 23 June, he was picked up for the second group stage match against Sweden as first choice centre-back Mats Hummels suffered an injury, the game ended 2–1 win for Germany. Four days later, he did not play the last group stage match and his side were knocked out by South Korea after a 2–0 defeat. On 19 May 2021, Rüdiger was selected to the squad for the UEFA Euro 2020. He played every minute in the tournament for Germany as they were eliminated by England in the round of 16.

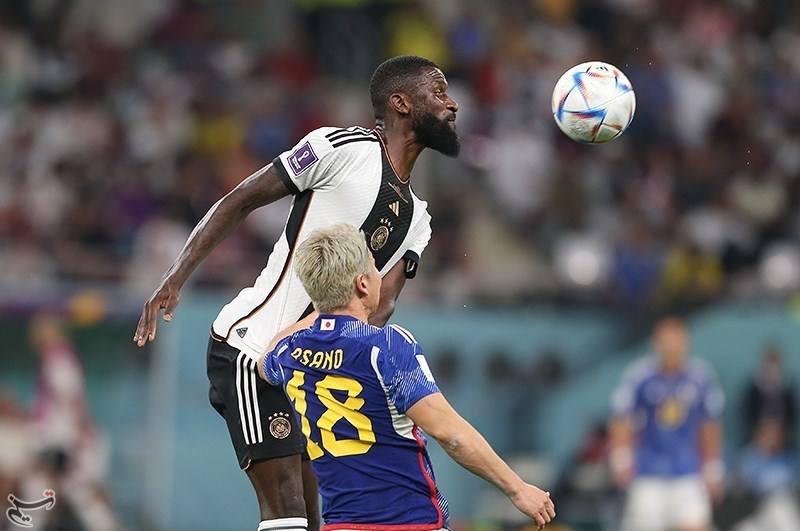
Rüdiger playing for Germany at the 2022 FIFA World Cup

In November 2022, Rüdiger was called up for the 2022 FIFA World Cup in Qatar. However, Germany were knocked out from the group stage, as they finished third behind Japan and Spain.

In May 2024, Rüdiger was included in the Germany squad for UEFA Euro 2024 on home soil. Germany reached the quarter-finals before being eliminated by eventual champions Spain.

On 21 May 2026, Rüdiger was selected in Germany’s 26-man squad for the 2026 FIFA World Cup in North America. At the tournament, Germany suffered a shock round of 32 exit to Paraguay.

On 1 September 2026, Rüdiger announced his retirement from international football.

== Style of play ==
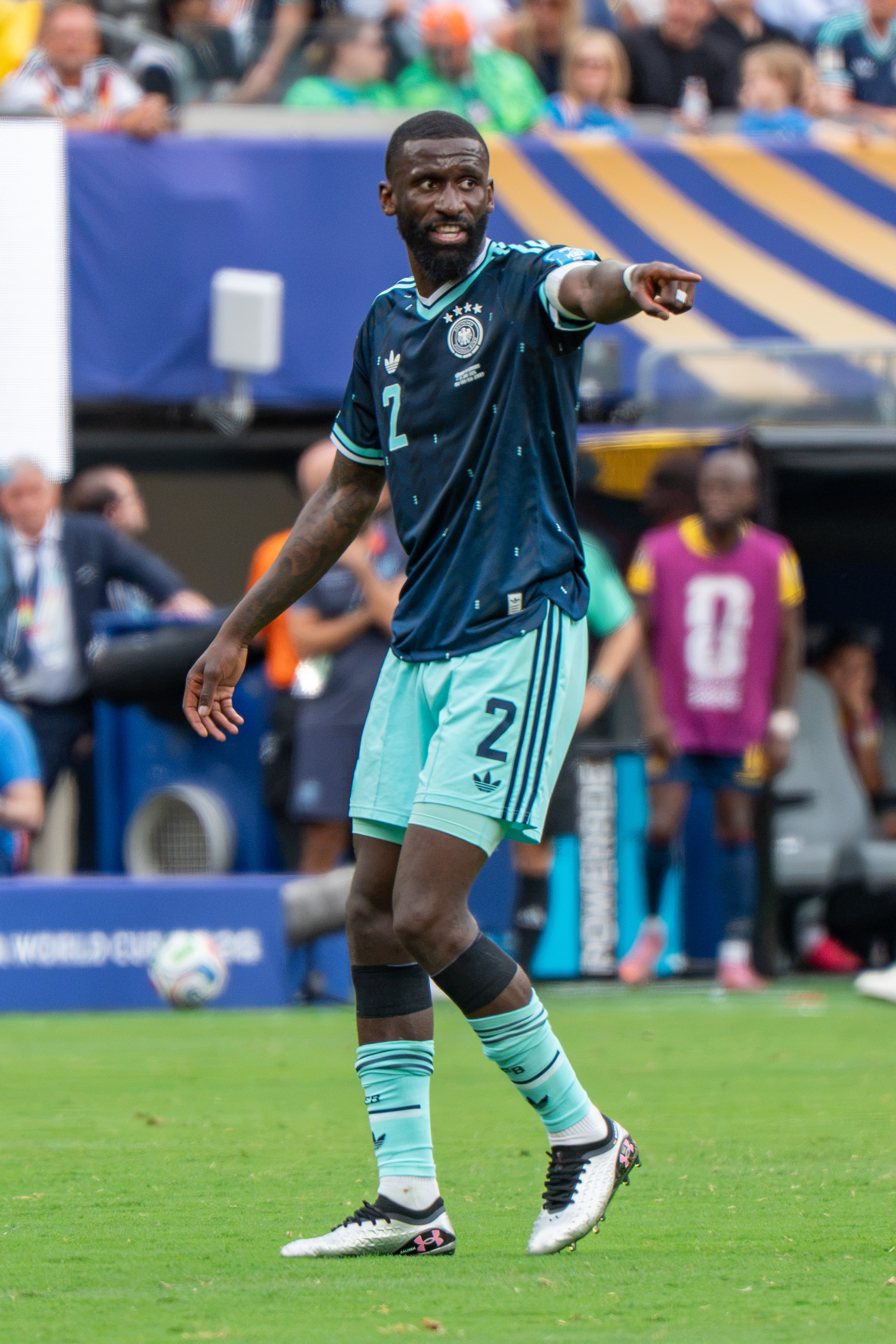
Rudiger during Ecuador vs Germany on 25 June 2026 at the 2026 FIFA World Cup

Normally a centre-back, Rüdiger is a versatile defender, who is also capable of playing as a full-back on either flank. In 2015, ESPN described him as a "tall, quick and athletic defender who is ... comfortable with the ball at his feet", also touting him as an "interesting prospect" who "has all the necessary physical attributes to become a top-level centre-back". His Chelsea profile described him as a "tough tackler" and a "commanding presence in the air". In addition to his strong physical attributes and aggressive playing style, he is also known for his leadership qualities and passing ability. Rüdiger’s speed and athleticism, coupled with his understanding of the game, allow him to excel both in man-to-man situations and in zonal marking.

== Personal life ==
Rüdiger was born in Berlin to an Afro-German father, Matthias, and a Sierra Leonean mother, Lily. He was named after Spanish actor Antonio Banderas. He grew up in the Berlin neighbourhood of Neukölln and is the half-brother of Sahr Senesie. Rüdiger has often spoken out on racism in the sport, most notably after a match against Tottenham Hotspur on 24 February 2020. In 2021, he wrote an article for The Players' Tribune, entitled "This Article Will Not Solve Racism in Football", on the subject, discussing his experiences with racism throughout his life and career, and potential ways to fight it. He is married to Laura Rüdiger and he has a son and a daughter.

Rüdiger is a practising Muslim. In 2020, Rüdiger gave a like to an Islamistic diatribe against French President Emmanuel Macron on Instagram. He later issued an apology for not reading the full post which was written in Cyrillic. In March 2024, Rüdiger posted a photo of himself in a white ihram robe and on a prayer rug, with his index finger of his right hand pointing to the sky, with a greeting for Ramadan in the caption.

Former editor-in-chief of the Bild Zeitung, a German tabloid, Julian Reichelt commented on the athlete's tawhid gesture claiming it was called the 'IS finger' by the Office for the Protection of Constitution and regarding as a sign of Islamism. In response to this, the player agreed to an interview, with the same tabloid, saying: "As a devout Muslim, I practice my faith, but I firmly distance myself from any kind of extremism and accusations of Islamism. Violence and terrorism are absolutely unacceptable. I stand for peace and tolerance." The German Ministry of Interior also made a clarifying statement regarding Reichelt's claim saying: "From the point of view of the BMI, the so-called 'tauhid' finger is to be understood as a declaration of faith and, in this respect, classified as unproblematic with regard to public safety. This applies regardless of the fact that Islamist groups appropriate this symbol and misuse it for their own purposes." As a result, together with the German Football Association, Rüdiger filed a complaint against Reichelt for defamation, insult, and incitement to hatred. The proceedings were later terminated by the Office of the Public Prosecutor based on grounds that the statement was covered under freedom of expression.

== Career statistics ==
=== Club ===
As of match played 4 November 2026

Appearances and goals by club, season and competition
Club	Season	League			National cup (Note: Includes DFB-Pokal, Coppa Italia, FA Cup, Copa del Rey)		League cup (Note: Includes EFL Cup)		Europe		Other		Total	
Club	Season	Division	Apps	Goals	Apps	Goals	Apps	Goals	Apps	Goals	Apps	Goals	Apps	Goals
VfB Stuttgart II	2011–12	3. Liga	17	1	—		—		—		—		17	1
VfB Stuttgart II	2012–13	3. Liga	4	2	—		—		—		—		4	2
VfB Stuttgart II	2014–15	3. Liga	1	0	—		—		—		—		1	0
VfB Stuttgart II	Total		22	3	—		—		—		—		22	3
VfB Stuttgart	2011–12	Bundesliga	1	0	0	0	—		—		—		1	0
VfB Stuttgart	2012–13	Bundesliga	16	0	4	0	—		4 (Note: Appearances in UEFA Europa League)	0	—		24	0
VfB Stuttgart	2013–14	Bundesliga	30	2	1	0	—		4	0	—		35	2
VfB Stuttgart	2014–15	Bundesliga	19	0	1	0	—		—		—		20	0
VfB Stuttgart	Total		66	2	6	0	—		8	0	—		80	2
Roma (loan)	2015–16	Serie A	30	2	1	0	—		6 (Note: Appearances in UEFA Champions League)	0	—		37	2
Roma	2016–17	Serie A	26	0	4	0	—		5	0	—		35	0
Roma	Roma total		56	2	5	0	—		11	0	—		72	2
Chelsea	2017–18	Premier League	27	2	6	0	5	1	6	0	1 (Note: Appearance in FA Community Shield)	0	45	3
Chelsea	2018–19	Premier League	33	1	2	0	4	0	4	0	1	0	44	1
Chelsea	2019–20	Premier League	20	2	4	0	0	0	2	0	0	0	26	2
Chelsea	2020–21	Premier League	19	1	4	0	0	0	11	0	—		34	1
Chelsea	2021–22	Premier League	34	3	5	0	3	1	9	1	3 (Note: One appearance in UEFA Super Cup, two appearances in FIFA Club World Cup)	0	54	5
Chelsea	Total		133	9	21	0	12	2	32	1	5	0	203	12
Real Madrid	2022–23	La Liga	33	1	5	0	—		10	1	5 (Note: One appearance in UEFA Super Cup, two appearances in Supercopa de España, two appearances in FIFA Club World Cup)	0	53	2
Real Madrid	2023–24	La Liga	33	1	1	0	—		12	0	2 (Note: Appearance(s) in Supercopa de España)	1	48	2
Real Madrid	2024–25	La Liga	29	0	4	1	—		13	2	9 (Note: One appearance in UEFA Super Cup, one appearance in FIFA Intercontinental Cup, two appearances in Supercopa de España, five appearances in FIFA Club World Cup)	0	55	3
Real Madrid	2025–26	La Liga	18	1	0	0	—		7	0	1	0	26	1
Real Madrid	2026–27	La Liga	4	1	0	0	—		3	1	0	0	7	2
Real Madrid	Total		117	4	10	1	—		45	4	17	1	189	10
Career total			394	20	42	1	12	2	96	5	22	1	566	29

=== International ===
Appearances and goals by national team and year
National team	Year	Apps	Goals
Germany	2014	5	0
Germany	2015	2	0
Germany	2016	4	0
Germany	2017	11	1
Germany	2018	7	0
Germany	2019	1	0
Germany	2020	7	0
Germany	2021	12	1
Germany	2022	8	0
Germany	2023	9	1
Germany	2024	11	0
Germany	2025	4	0
Germany	2026	5	0
Total		86	3

Germany score listed first, score column indicates score after each Rüdiger goal.

List of international goals scored by Antonio Rüdiger
No.	Date	Venue	Cap	Opponent	Score	Result	Competition
1	8 October 2017	Fritz-Walter-Stadion, Kaiserslautern, Germany	20	Azerbaijan	3–1	5–1	2018 FIFA World Cup qualification
2	8 September 2021	Laugardalsvöllur, Reykjavík, Iceland	47	Iceland	2–0	4–0	2022 FIFA World Cup qualification
3	17 October 2023	Lincoln Financial Field, Philadelphia, United States	64	Mexico	1–0	2–2	Friendly

== Honours ==
Chelsea

- FA Cup: 2017–18; runner-up: 2019–20, 2020–21, 2021–22
- UEFA Champions League: 2020–21
- UEFA Europa League: 2018–19
- UEFA Super Cup: 2021
- FIFA Club World Cup: 2021
- EFL Cup runner-up: 2018–19, 2021–22

Real Madrid

- La Liga: 2023–24
- Copa del Rey: 2022–23
- Supercopa de España: 2024
- UEFA Champions League: 2023–24
- UEFA Super Cup: 2022, 2024
- FIFA Club World Cup: 2022
- FIFA Intercontinental Cup: 2024

Germany

- FIFA Confederations Cup: 2017

Individual

- Fritz Walter Medal U19 Gold: 2012
- UEFA Champions League Squad/Team of the Season: 2020–21, 2021–22, 2023–24
- PFA Team of the Year: 2021–22 Premier League
- ESM Team of the Year: 2021–22, 2023–24
- La Liga Team of the Season: 2023–24, 2024–25
- FIFPRO Men's World 11: 2024
- FIFA Men's World 11: 2024
- IFFHS Men's World Team: 2024
