= Alexander Riemann =

German footballer

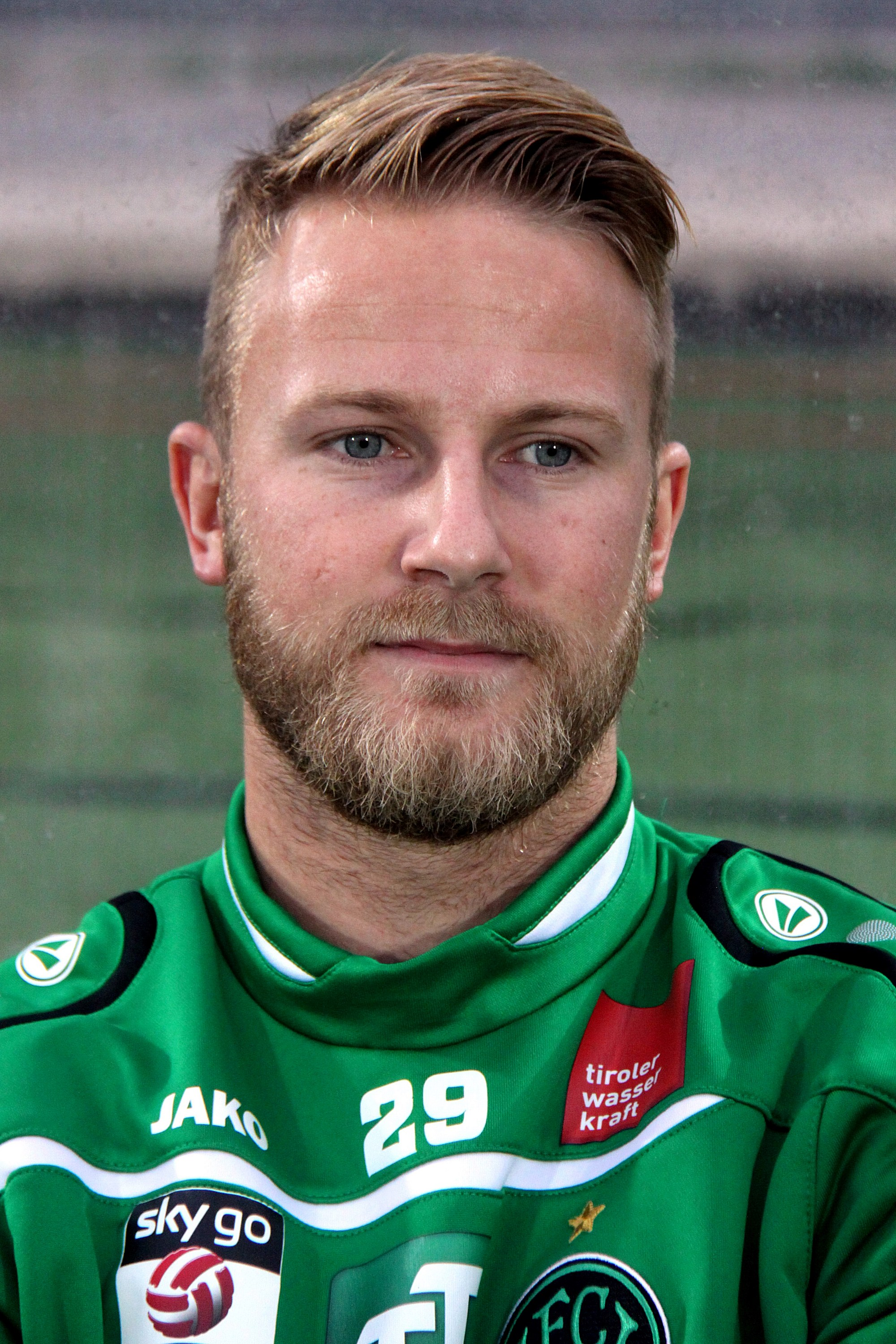
- Riemann with Wacker Innsbruck in 2015

Personal information
- Date of birth: 12 April 1992 (age 34)
- Place of birth: Mühldorf, Germany
- Height: 1.83 m (6 ft 0 in)
- Position: Forward

Youth career
- RSV Mößling
- SV Weidenbach
- –2008: Wacker Burghausen
- 2008–2010: VfB Stuttgart

Senior career*
Years	Team	Apps	(Gls)
2010–2014	VfB Stuttgart II	82	(9)
2012–2013	→ SV Sandhausen (loan)	12	(1)
2014–2015	Wehen Wiesbaden	26	(4)
2015–2017	Wacker Innsbruck	38	(7)
2017–2018	LASK Linz	30	(1)
2018–2020	VfL Osnabrück	3	(0)
2020	Wacker Burghausen	1	(0)
2021–2022	TSV Ampfing	13	(2)
Total		205	(24)

International career
2008	Germany U17	1	(0)
2009–2010	Germany U18	5	(1)
2011	Germany U19	1	(0)

Managerial career
- 2021–2022: TSV Ampfing (player-assistant)
- * Club domestic league appearances and goals

Alexander Riemann (born 12 April 1992) is a German former professional footballer who played as a forward. He is the younger brother of football goalkeeper Manuel Riemann.

== Career ==
In 2010, Riemann had his debut for VfB Stuttgart II in the 3. Liga. For the 2012–13 season he was loaned out to SV Sandhausen.
