= Sebastian Enderle =

German footballer

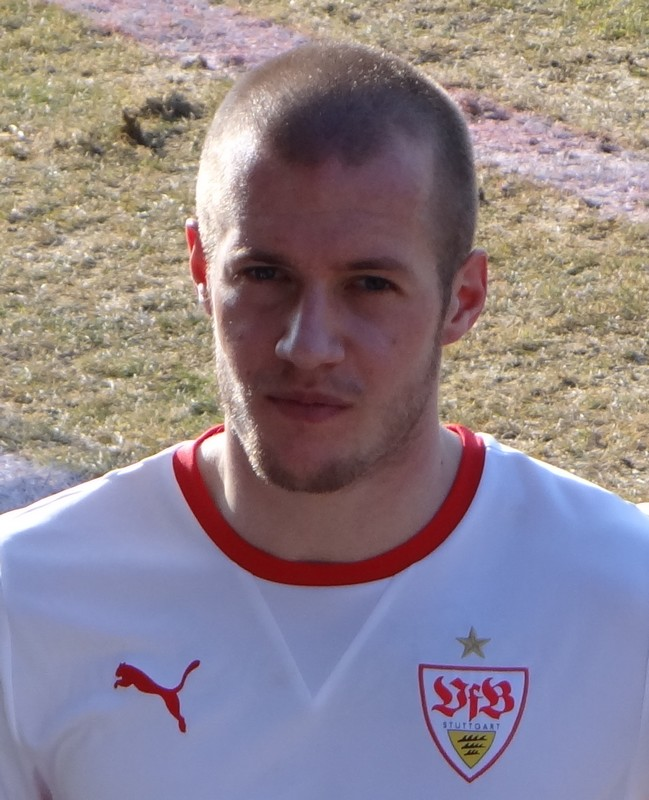
- Enderle with VfB Stuttgart

Personal information
- Date of birth: 29 May 1989 (age 37)
- Place of birth: Ulm, West Germany
- Height: 1.70 m (5 ft 7 in)
- Position: Defender

Youth career
- –2002: SSG Ulm 99
- 2002–2008: VfB Stuttgart

Senior career*
Years	Team	Apps	(Gls)
2008–2013	VfB Stuttgart II	75	(0)
2014–2022	FV Illertissen	142	(5)
- * Club domestic league appearances and goals as of 14 May 2022

Sebastian Enderle (born 29 May 1989) is a German football defender.
