= Marc Groß =

German footballer

Personal information
- Date of birth: 12 August 1987 (age 39)
- Place of birth: Germany
- Position: Defensive midfielder

Youth career
- VfR Kaiserslautern
- Eintracht Kaiserslautern
- –2003: TSG Kaiserslautern
- 2003–2006: 1. FC Kaiserslautern

Senior career*
Years	Team	Apps	(Gls)
2006–2009	1. FC Kaiserslautern II	68	(3)
2009–2016	SV Elversberg	166	(1)
2016–2018	VfR Kaiserslautern		
- * Club domestic league appearances and goals as of 6 June 2015

Marc Groß (born 12 August 1987) is a German footballer who plays as a defensive midfielder.
