= Isabell Rathgeb =

German politician (born 1980)

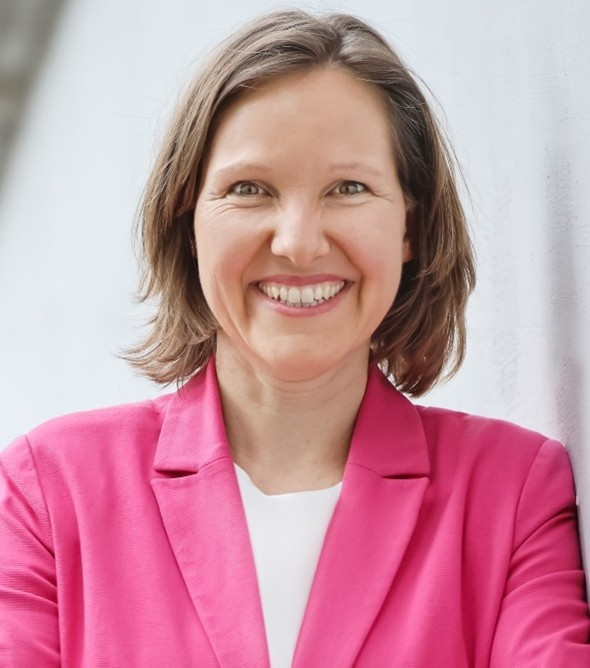
- Rathgeb in 2025

Member of the Landtag of Baden-Württemberg
- Incumbent
- Assumed office 11 May 2026
- Constituency: Schwäbisch Hall

Personal details
- Born: 1980 (age 45–46)
- Party: Christian Democratic Union

Isabell Rathgeb (born 1980) is a German politician who was elected member of the Landtag of Baden-Württemberg in 2026. She has been a district councillor of Schwäbisch Hall since 2019, and has served as group leader of the Christian Democratic Union in the district council since 2022.
