= Jonas Wieszt =

German footballer

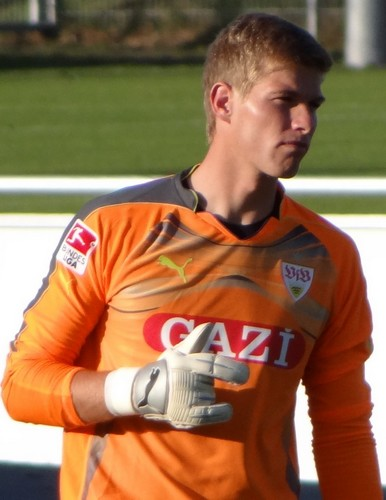

Personal information
- Full name: Jonas Wieszt
- Date of birth: 3 August 1992 (age 34)
- Place of birth: Schwäbisch Hall, Germany
- Height: 1.87 m (6 ft 2 in)
- Position: Goalkeeper

Team information
- Current team: TSV Ilshofen
- Number: 29

Youth career
- FC Ottendorf
- TSV Gaildorf
- –2007: TSV Crailsheim
- 2007–2011: VfB Stuttgart

Senior career*
Years	Team	Apps	(Gls)
2011–2013	VfB Stuttgart II	4	(0)
2014–2017	Sportfreunde Schwäbisch Hall	102	(0)
2017–2022	TSV Ilshofen	57	(0)

Managerial career
- 2014–2017: SF Schwäbisch Hall (youth) (goalkeeping coach)
- 2017–: TSV Ilshofen (youth) (goalkeeping coach)
- * Club domestic league appearances and goals

Jonas Wieszt (born 3 August 1992, in Schwäbisch Hall) is a German former footballer who played as a goalkeeper.
