= Christoph Hemlein =

German footballer

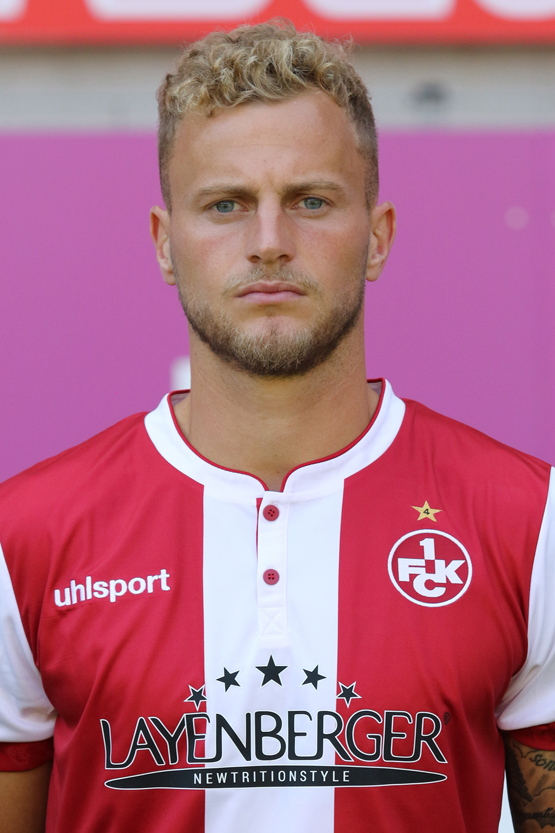
- Hemlein in 2018

Personal information
- Date of birth: 16 December 1990 (age 35)
- Place of birth: Heidelberg, Germany
- Height: 1.80 m (5 ft 11 in)
- Position: Winger

Youth career
- 2001–2003: FV Nußloch
- 2003–2005: FC Zuzenhausen
- 2005–2010: TSG Hoffenheim

Senior career*
Years	Team	Apps	(Gls)
2010–2011	TSG Hoffenheim II	32	(9)
2011–2013	VfB Stuttgart	3	(0)
2011–2013	VfB Stuttgart II	60	(9)
2013–2014	NEC	29	(4)
2014–2018	Arminia Bielefeld	123	(12)
2018–2020	1. FC Kaiserslautern	45	(5)
2020–2023	SV Meppen	90	(9)
- * Club domestic league appearances and goals as of 27 May 2023

Christoph Hemlein (born 16 December 1990) is a German professional footballer who plays as a winger.

== Career ==
Hemlein made his Bundesliga debut for VfB Stuttgart on 22 October 2011 against 1. FC Nürnberg. Four days later, he scored in the second round of the 2011–12 DFB-Pokal against FSV Frankfurt his first goal for the first team of VfB Stuttgart.

On 15 May 2013, Hemlein signed a contract until June 2016 with Eredivisie club NEC.

After the relegation of NEC, Hemlein left the side and signed with Arminia Bielefeld which then played in the German 3. Liga.

In July 2020, Hemlein joined SV Meppen, after his contract with league rivals 1. FC Kaiserslautern had expired.
