= Manuel Schwenk =

German footballer

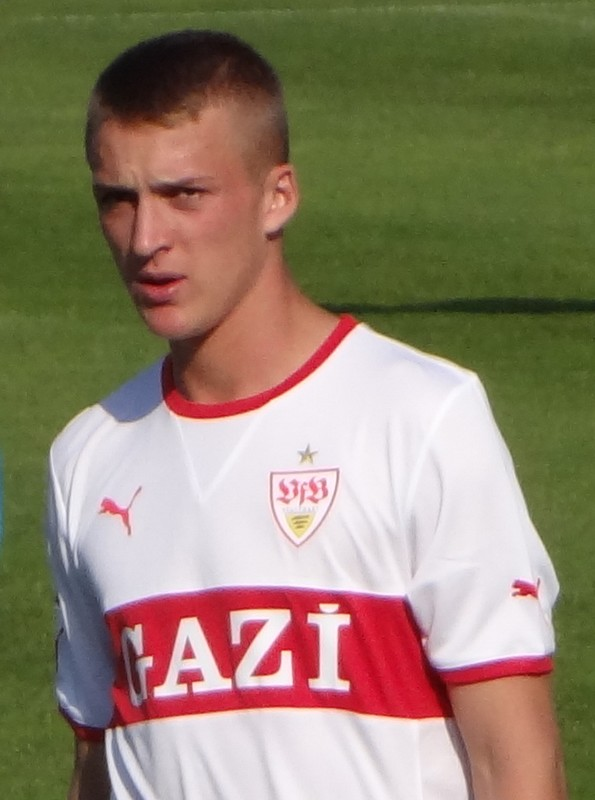
- Schwenk with VfB Stuttgart

Personal information
- Birth name: Manuel Janzer
- Date of birth: 7 March 1992 (age 34)
- Place of birth: Aalen, Germany
- Height: 1.78 m (5 ft 10 in)
- Position: Midfielder

Team information
- Current team: SpVg. Eidertal Molfsee
- Number: 15

Youth career
- TSV Oberkochen
- –2011: VfB Stuttgart

Senior career*
Years	Team	Apps	(Gls)
2011–2014	VfB Stuttgart II	94	(15)
2014–2015	1. FC Heidenheim	10	(0)
2015–2018	Holstein Kiel	38	(7)
2018–2021	Eintracht Braunschweig	48	(4)
2021–2023	Holstein Kiel II	26	(2)
2023–	SpVg. Eidertal Molfsee	9	(2)

International career
2007–2008	Germany U-16	4	(0)
2008–2009	Germany U-17	11	(2)
2009–2010	Germany U-18	6	(1)
- * Club domestic league appearances and goals as of 18 May 2024

Manuel Schwenk (born 7 March 1992), previously known as Manuel Janzer until 2019, is a German professional footballer who plays as a midfielder for the Oberliga Schleswig-Holstein club SpVg. Eidertal Molfsee.

== Career ==
A product of the VfB Stuttgart youth academy, Janzer won the 2009 UEFA European Under-17 Championship with Germany. He played for VfB Stuttgart II in the 3. Liga from 2011 to 2014, making 94 league appearances and scoring 15 goals, before spending the 2014–15 season with 2. Bundesliga club 1. FC Heidenheim. In 2015 he joined Holstein Kiel, and he moved to Eintracht Braunschweig in 2018, where he made 14 appearances in the 2. Bundesliga in the 2020–21 season. He returned to Holstein Kiel in 2021 to play for its reserve team in the Regionalliga Nord, before joining SpVg. Eidertal Molfsee in 2023.

== Personal life ==
Schwenk was born Aalen, Baden-Württemberg with the name Manuel Janzer. He was married in May 2019, and adopted his wife's surname of Schwenk.
