= Daniel Vier =

German-Brazilian footballer (born 1982)

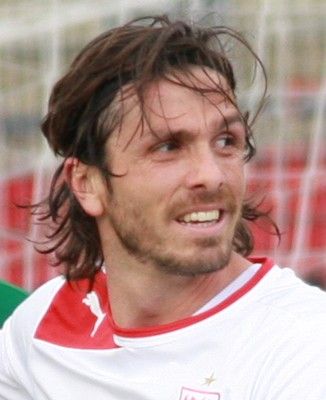

Personal information
- Date of birth: May 16, 1982 (age 44)
- Place of birth: Porto Alegre, Brazil
- Height: 1.88 m (6 ft 2 in)
- Position: Centre-back

Team information
- Current team: Eintracht Stadtallendorf (U23 manager)

Youth career
- Juventude
- Internacional
- RS FC
- –2005: Eintracht Stadtallendorf

Senior career*
Years	Team	Apps	(Gls)
2005–2007	SC Waldgirmes	51	(5)
2007–2008	Viktoria Aschaffenburg	31	(8)
2008–2009	Eintracht Frankfurt II	27	(5)
2009–2013	VfB Stuttgart II	127	(16)
2014	1. FC Heidenheim	5	(0)
2014–2016	VfB Stuttgart II	29	(2)
2016–2020	Eintracht Stadtallendorf	69	(5)
2020–2021	FSV Fernwald	8	(0)
2021–2022	FC Burgsolms	19	(9)

Managerial career
- 2019–2020: Eintracht Stadtallendorf (player-assistant)
- 2022–2023: FC Burgsolms (U19 manager)
- 2023–: Eintracht Stadtallendorf (U23 manager)
- * Club domestic league appearances and goals

Daniel Vier (born May 16, 1982) is a retired German-Brazilian footballer and current U-23 manager at Eintracht Stadtallendorf.
