= André Weis =

German footballer

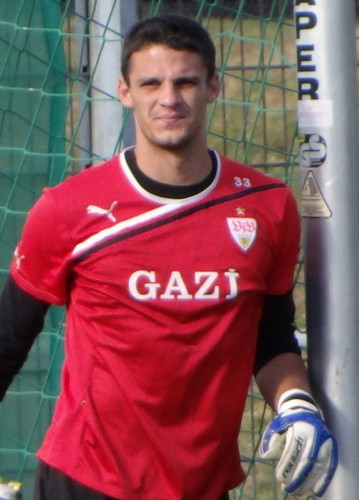
- Weis with VfB Stuttgart

Personal information
- Date of birth: 30 September 1989 (age 37)
- Place of birth: Boppard, West Germany
- Height: 1.90 m (6 ft 3 in)
- Position: Goalkeeper

Team information
- Current team: Sportfreunde Siegen
- Number: 1

Youth career
- FC Germania Metternich
- SG Andernach
- –2007: FV Rübenach
- 2007–2008: TuS Koblenz

Senior career*
Years	Team	Apps	(Gls)
2008–2009	TuS Koblenz	0	(0)
2009–2010	SV Wilhelmshaven	32	(0)
2010–2011	TuS Koblenz	9	(0)
2011–2013	VfB Stuttgart II	55	(0)
2012–2013	VfB Stuttgart	0	(0)
2013–2015	FC Ingolstadt 04	3	(0)
2014–2015	→ FC Ingolstadt 04 II	2	(0)
2015–2016	FSV Frankfurt	34	(0)
2016–2018	1. FC Kaiserslautern	4	(0)
2017–2018	→ Jahn Regensburg (loan)	6	(0)
2018–2020	Jahn Regensburg	4	(0)
2020–2021	Viktoria Köln	12	(0)
2021–2024	Fortuna Köln	96	(0)
2024–	Sportfreunde Siegen	0	(0)
- * Club domestic league appearances and goals as of 18 May 2024

André Weis (born 30 September 1989) is a German professional footballer who plays as a goalkeeper for Sportfreunde Siegen.

== Career ==
On 17 February 2012, Weis extended his contract with VfB Stuttgart until June 2014. On 1 July 2013, he moved to FC Ingolstadt 04. In summer 2016, he joined 1. FC Kaiserslautern.

In 2015, he signed for FSV Frankfurt.

On 3 August 2017, Weis joined SSV Jahn Regensburg on loan for the season. After his loan from 1. FC Kaiserslautern ended at the end of the 2017–18 season, he signed a three-year contract with Regensburg.

Failing to gain a spot in the first team in Regensburg, he joined FC Viktoria Köln in January 2020.

In 2021, he signed for Fortuna Köln.
