= Lukas Kiefer =

German footballer (born 1993)

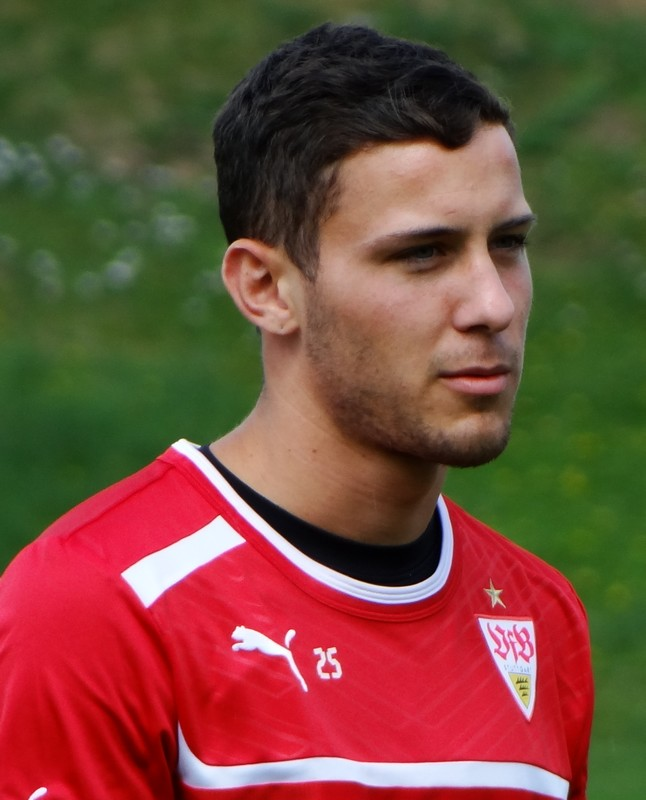

Personal information
- Date of birth: 25 April 1993 (age 33)
- Place of birth: Böblingen, Germany
- Height: 1.78 m (5 ft 10 in)
- Position: Midfielder

Team information
- Current team: Stuttgarter Kickers
- Number: 28

Youth career
- 2004–2012: VfB Stuttgart

Senior career*
| Years | Team | Apps | (Gls) |
| 2012–2014 | VfB Stuttgart II | 49 | (2) |
| 2014–2016 | 1. FC Saarbrücken | 30 | (0) |
| 2015 | 1. FC Saarbrücken II | 1 | (0) |
| 2016–2018 | SV Waldhof Mannheim | 39 | (3) |
| 2018–2020 | VfB Stuttgart II | 42 | (5) |
| 2020–2022 | SSV Ulm 1846 | 28 | (2) |
| 2022– | Stuttgarter Kickers | 109 | (7) |

International career
| 2008 | Germany U16 | 3 | (0) |
- * Club domestic league appearances and goals as of 26 June 2026

Lukas Kiefer (born 25 April 1993) is a German footballer who plays as a midfielder for Regionalliga Südwest club Stuttgarter Kickers.

== Club career ==
Kiefer joined VfB Stuttgart in 2004 and was promoted to the reserve team in 2012. He made his debut for the club in a 3-0 win against SpVgg Unterhaching coming as a substitute for Rani Khedira and scoring a goal in the 88th minute. He signed for 1. FC Saarbrücken at the end of the 2013–14 season.

== International career ==
He was capped for Germany U16 3 times in 2008. He made his debut against Finland.
