= Steffen Lang =

German footballer

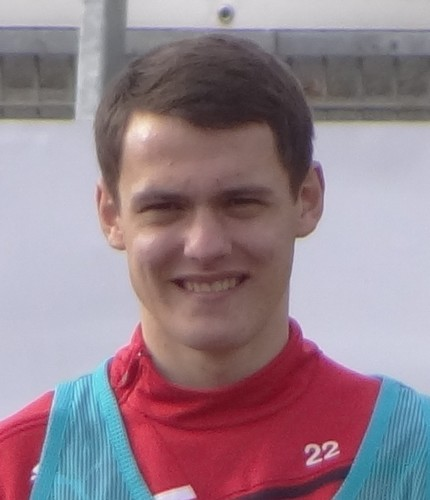
- Lang in 2012

Personal information
- Date of birth: 14 August 1993 (age 33)
- Place of birth: Nördlingen, Germany
- Height: 1.78 m (5 ft 10 in)
- Position: Right-back

Team information
- Current team: TSV Essingen
- Number: 14

Youth career
- FC Pflaumloch
- –2008: TSV 1861 Nördlingen
- 2008–2011: VfB Stuttgart

Senior career*
Years	Team	Apps	(Gls)
2011–2015	VfB Stuttgart II	105	(1)
2015–2017	Arminia Bielefeld	6	(0)
2017–2020	Viktoria Köln	70	(3)
2020–2021	SC Verl	10	(1)
2022–	TSV Essingen	78	(0)

International career
2011	Germany U19	1	(1)
- * Club domestic league appearances and goals as of 1 June 2024

Steffen Lang (born 14 August 1993) is a German professional footballer who plays as a right-back for TSV Essingen.

== Career ==
Lang was born in Nördlingen.

For the 2015–16 season Lang moved to Arminia Bielefeld.
