= Großräschen =

Großräschen Rań
- Town
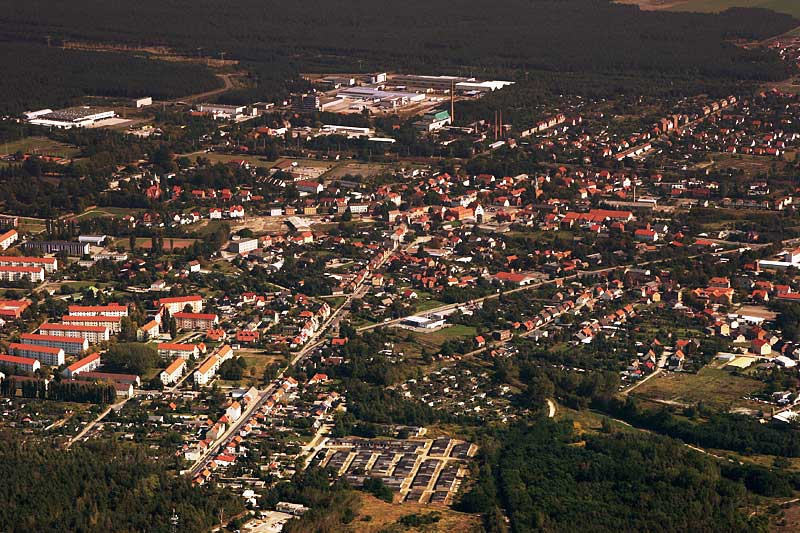

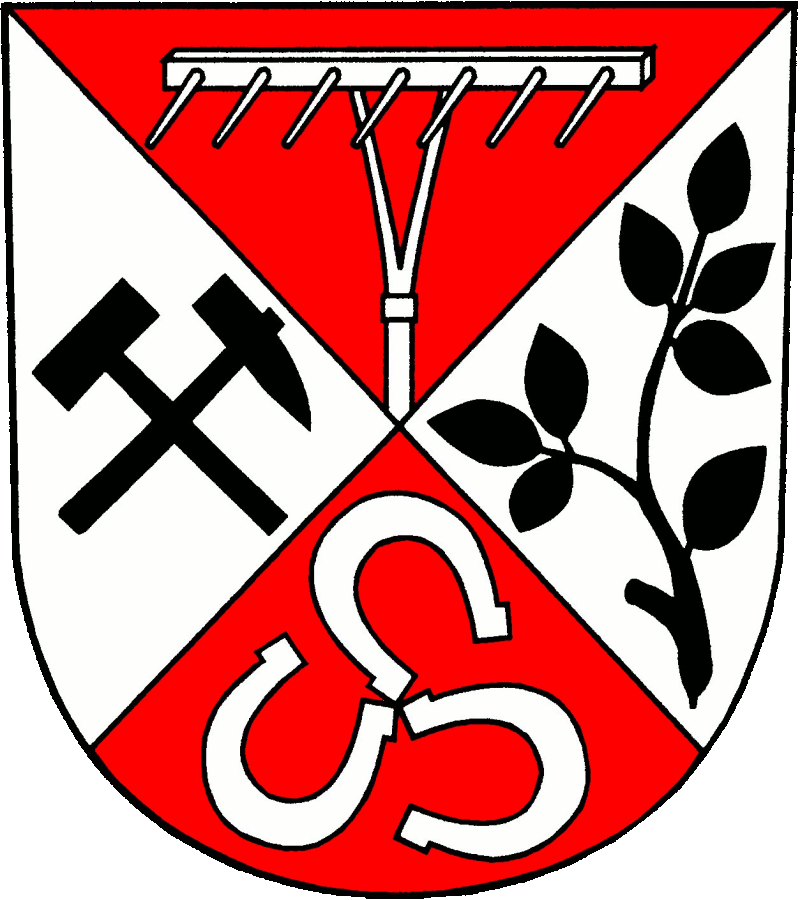
- Coat of arms

- Location of Großräschen within Oberspreewald-Lausitz district
- Interactive map of Großräschen
- Location within Germany Location within Brandenburg
- Coordinates: 51°34′59″N 14°00′00″E
- Country: Germany
- State: Brandenburg
- District: Oberspreewald-Lausitz
- Subdivisions: 5 Stadtteile / 7 Ortsteile

Government
  - Mayor (2017–25): Thomas Zenker (SPD)

Area
  - Total: 81.86 km^{2} (31.61 sq mi)
- Elevation: 115 m (377 ft)

Population (2025-12-31)
  - Total: 8,327
  - Density: 101.7/km^{2} (263.5/sq mi)
- Time zone: UTC+01:00 (CET)
  - Summer (DST): UTC+02:00 (CEST)
- Postal codes: 01983
- Dialling codes: 035753
- Vehicle registration: OSL
- Website: www.grossraeschen.de

Großräschen (German pronunciation: [ˌɡʁoːsˈʁɛʃn̩]; Lower Sorbian: Rań) is a town in Lower Lusatia, in Germany. Administratively, it is part of the district of Oberspreewald-Lausitz, in the state of Brandenburg.

== Geographical position ==
Großräschen is south of the Niederlausitzer Landrücken, a sandy stretch of land with pine forests in the centre of Lusatia. The source of the small river Rainitza used to be in meadows north of the town centre. South of the town, Lake Grossraschen (formerly an open-cast lignite mine) was completed in 2018. The town proper comprises the historical core, Kleinräschen, and Großräschen. The southernmost quarter, Bückgen, was pulled down due to mining. Outside the town proper are the villages of Freienhufen (historically Dobristroh), Bulldorf, Dörrwalde, Wormlage, Saalhausen, Woschkow, and Schmogro (Großräschen-Ost).

== History ==
Both Großräschen and Kleinräschen were first mentioned in an official document in 1370. The form of settlement and the name suggest that Kleinräschen is older than Großräschen. The villages developed slowly; the Wendish population depended almost entirely on agriculture. From the middle of the 19th century onwards, heavy industry developed, and the villages grew rapidly. From 1815 to 1947, they were part of the Prussian Province of Brandenburg. In 1965, they were granted the status of a town, having been incorporated into one community in 1925. From 1952 to 1990, Großräschen was part of the Bezirk Cottbus of East Germany. The 1980s brought the destruction of Bückgen, whose 4000 inhabitants had to leave their homes and were moved into blocks of flats. After the fall of the Berlin Wall, the industrial decline (glass manufacturing, brick production, mining and agriculture used to appear in the town's coat of arms) caused heavy unemployment. The completion of the Grossraschen lake instigated a tourism industry with lakeside hotels, town marina harbor, rental holiday homes, and a lakeside winery.

== Mayors ==
Thomas Zenker (SPD) was elected in November 2009 with 93.9% of the votes for a term of eight years. (Turnout 35.3%). He was re-elected in September 2017 with 85.6% for a second term of eight years.

== Demography ==
Development of Population since 1875 within the Current Boundaries (Blue Line: Population; Dotted Line: Comparison to Population Development of Brandenburg state; Grey Background: Time of Nazi rule; Red Background: Time of Communist rule)

Recent Population Development and Projections (Population Development before Census 2011 (blue line); Recent Population Development according to the Census in Germany in 2011 (blue bordered line); Official projections for 2005-2030 (yellow line); for 2017-2030 (scarlet line); for 2020-2030 (green line)

Großräschen: Population development
within the current boundaries (2020)

Year	Pop.	±% p.a.
1875	2,975	—
1890	4,843	+3.30%
1910	13,309	+5.18%
1925	14,414	+0.53%
1939	15,024	+0.30%
1950	16,282	+0.73%
1964	16,210	−0.03%

Year	Pop.	±% p.a.
1971	17,006	+0.69%
1981	14,306	−1.71%
1985	14,023	−0.50%
1990	14,476	+0.64%
1995	14,296	−0.25%
2000	12,693	−2.35%
2005	11,335	−2.24%

Year	Pop.	±% p.a.
2010	10,262	−1.97%
2015	8,655	−3.35%
2016	8,629	−0.30%
2017	8,602	−0.31%
2018	8,572	−0.35%
2019	8,471	−1.18%
2020	8,455	−0.19%

== Sights ==
- Protestant Church
- Catholic Church with interior decoration by Friedrich Preß
- Medieval village church in Freienhufen
- open-cast mine lookout
- Historic village structures in Kleinräschen, Dörrwalde, Wormlage, Saalhausen (farm type of Senftenberger Vierseitenhof)
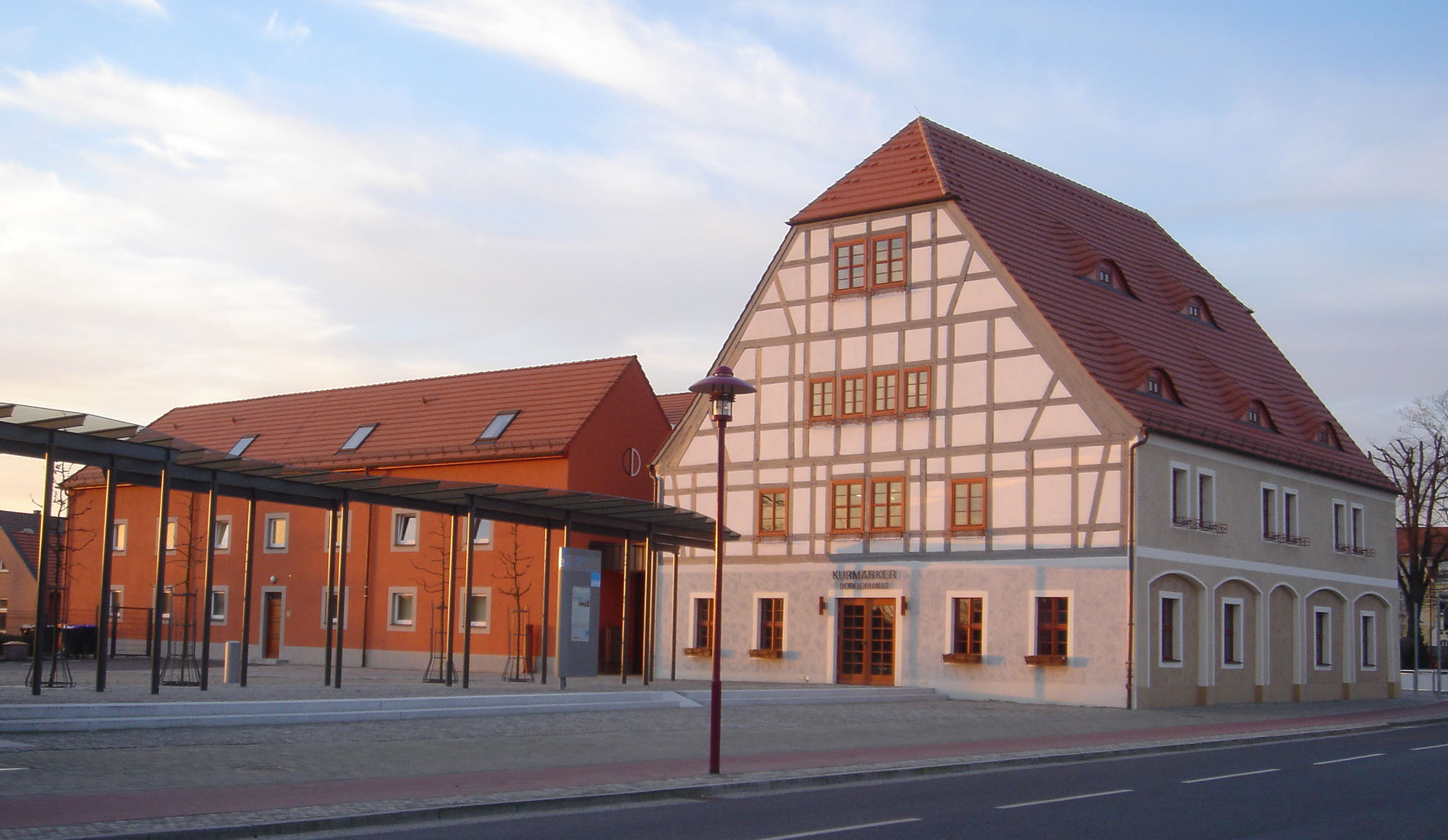
Kurmärker Großräschen, mit Wettigs Hof (13.03.2007)

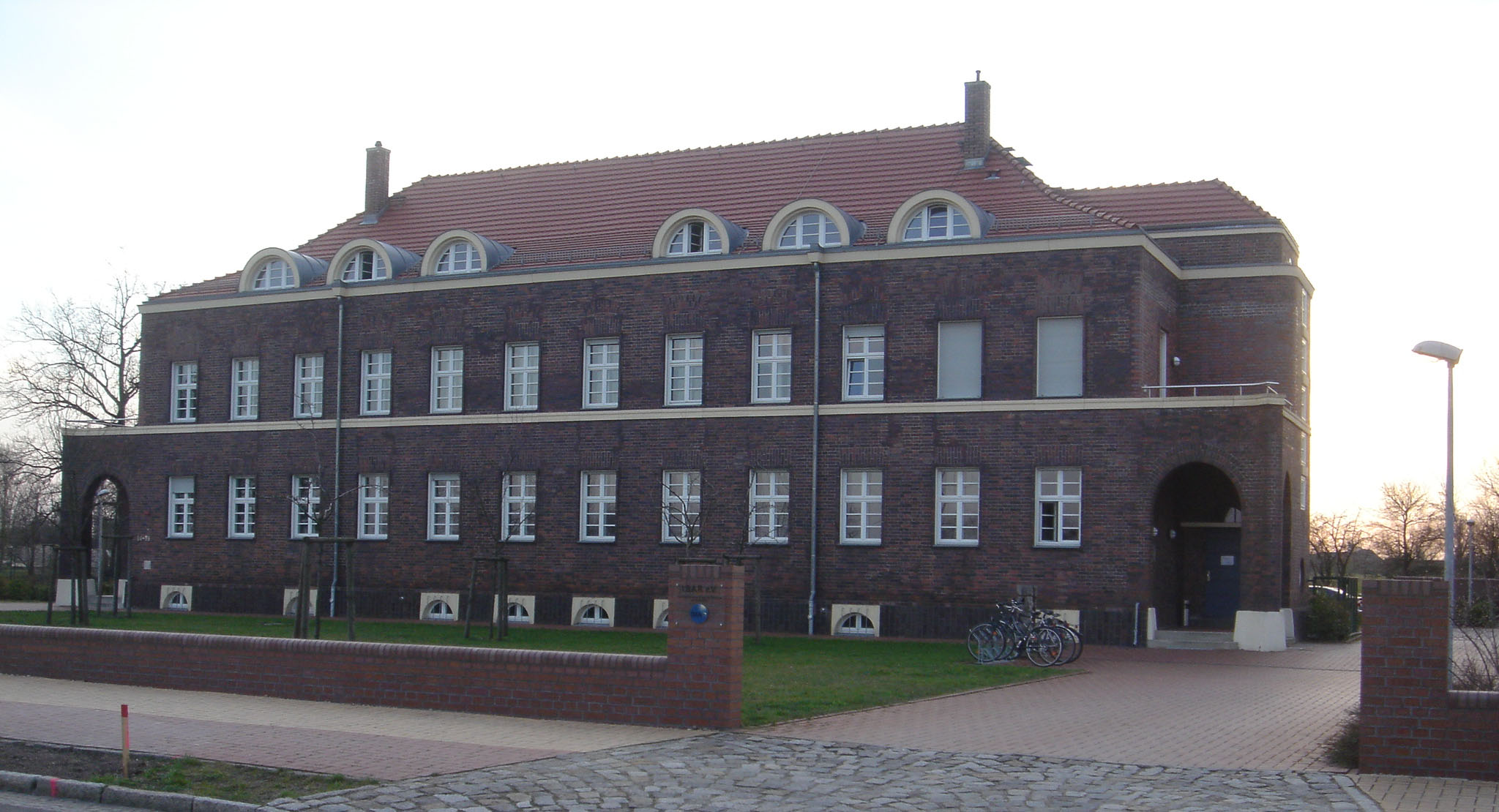
IBA-Geschäftsstelle Großräschen (13.03.2007)

== Infrastructure ==
- Rail links to Berlin, Senftenberg, Stralsund (slow trains)
- Federal road B 96
- Motorway A 13/E 66

== Partner cities ==
- Trzebiatów (Treptow), Poland, since 2006
- Sprockhövel, Germany
- Hattingen, Germany

== People ==
- Herbert Scurla (1905–1981)
- Bernhard Lehmann (born 1948)
- Hans-Joachim Hartnick (born 1955)
