= Pascal Breier =

German footballer

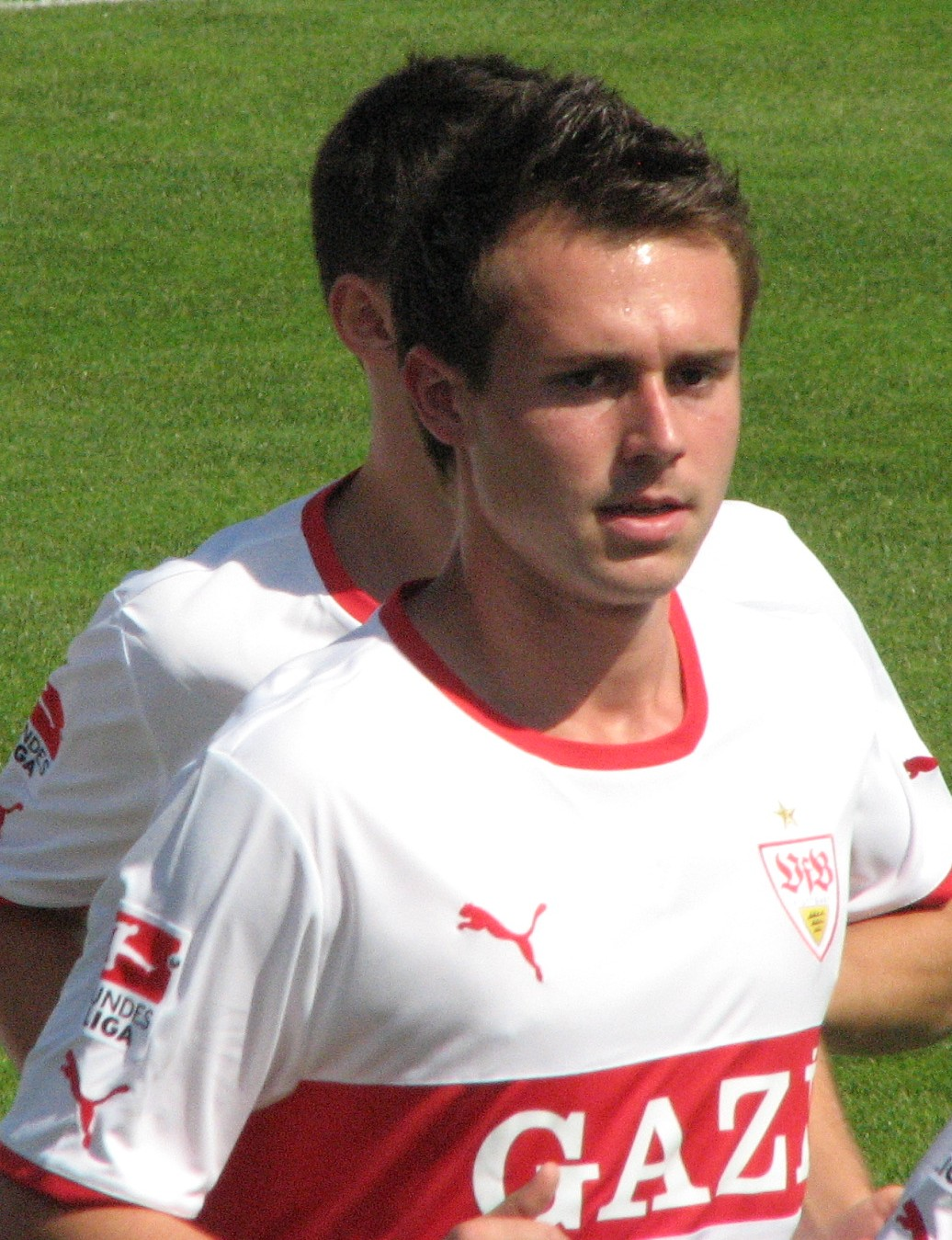
- Breier with VfB Stuttgart in 2011

Personal information
- Date of birth: 2 February 1992 (age 34)
- Place of birth: Nürtingen, Germany
- Height: 1.85 m (6 ft 1 in)
- Position: Forward

Team information
- Current team: FC Anker Wismar

Youth career
- TSV Neckartenzlingen
- –2006: SSV Reutlingen
- 2006–2010: VfB Stuttgart

Senior career*
Years	Team	Apps	(Gls)
2010–2015	VfB Stuttgart II	107	(14)
2012	→ Sonnenhof Großaspach (loan)	17	(5)
2015–2016	Sonnenhof Großaspach	36	(11)
2016–2017	VfB Stuttgart II	48	(22)
2017	VfB Stuttgart	0	(0)
2018–2023	Hansa Rostock	139	(39)
2023	Hansa Rostock II	8	(2)
2023–2024	VfB Lübeck	17	(2)
2024–	FC Anker Wismar	0	(0)

International career
2007	Germany U15	2	(3)
2007–2008	Germany U16	7	(0)
2009	Germany U17	1	(0)
- * Club domestic league appearances and goals as of 22 May 2024

Pascal Breier (born 2 February 1992) is a German professional footballer who plays as a forward for Oberliga NOFV-Nord club FC Anker Wismar. He represented Germany at youth levels U15 through U17.

== Career ==
Breier made his debut for VfB Stuttgart II in the 3. Liga on 16 October 2010. He signed on 28 June 2011 a professional contract until June 2015 with VfB Stuttgart. On 16 August 2012, he was loaned out to Sonnenhof Großaspach until December 2012.

For the 2015–16 season he returned to Sonnenhof Großaspach. In August 2016 he moved back to VfB Stuttgart II. Breier made his debut for the Bundesliga team of VfB Stuttgart on 19 December 2017 in the 2017–18 DFB-Pokal against Mainz 05.

On 1 January 2018, Breier moved to Hansa Rostock. For the 2023–24 season, Breier was moved by Hansa to their reserves team in Regionalliga.

On 31 August 2023, Hansa announced that Breier would be released from his contract by mutual consent to join VfB Lübeck. He left Lübeck at the end of the season, retired from playing and became team manager at Hansa Rostock. After two matchdays of the 2024–25 season, he quit as team manager citing personal reasons.

Breier came out of his brief retirement joining Oberliga NOFV-Nord club FC Anker Wismar in August 2024.

== Career statistics ==
As of match played 1 July 2024

Appearances and goals by club, season and competition
Club	Season	League			DFB-Pokal		Other		Total	
Club	Season	Division	Apps	Goals	Apps	Goals	Apps	Goals	Apps	Goals
VfB Stuttgart II	2010–11	3. Liga	9	1	—		—		9	1
VfB Stuttgart II	2011–12	3. Liga	19	0	—		—		19	0
VfB Stuttgart II	2012–13	3. Liga	22	2	—		—		22	2
VfB Stuttgart II	2013–14	3. Liga	26	8	—		—		26	8
VfB Stuttgart II	2014–15	3. Liga	31	3	—		—		31	3
VfB Stuttgart II	Total		107	14	0	0	0	0	107	14
Sonnenhof Großaspach (loan)	2012–13	Regionalliga Südwest	17	5	1	0	—		18	5
Sonnenhof Großaspach	2015–16	3. Liga	32	11	—		—		32	11
Sonnenhof Großaspach	2016–17	3. Liga	4	0	—		—		4	0
Sonnenhof Großaspach	Total		36	11	0	0	0	0	36	11
VfB Stuttgart II	2016–17	Regionalliga Südwest	26	10	—		—		26	10
VfB Stuttgart II	2017–18	Regionalliga Südwest	22	12	—		—		22	12
VfB Stuttgart II	Total		48	22	0	0	0	0	48	22
VfB Stuttgart	2017–18	Bundesliga	0	0	1	0	—		1	0
Hansa Rostock	2017–18	3. Liga	18	6	0	0	—		18	6
Hansa Rostock	2018–19	3. Liga	34	7	2	1	—		36	8
Hansa Rostock	2019–20	3. Liga	36	15	1	0	—		37	15
Hansa Rostock	2020–21	3. Liga	33	6	1	0	—		34	6
Hansa Rostock	2021–22	2. Bundesliga	13	4	1	1	—		14	5
Hansa Rostock	2022–23	2. Bundesliga	5	1	1	0	—		6	1
Hansa Rostock	2023–24	2. Bundesliga	0	0	0	0	—		0	0
Hansa Rostock	Total		139	39	6	2	0	0	145	41
Hansa Rostock II	2023–24	Regionalliga Nordost	5	1	—		—		5	1
VfB Lübeck	2023–24	3. Liga	17	2	—		—		17	2
Career total			369	94	8	2	0	0	377	96
