= Tobias Rathgeb =

German footballer

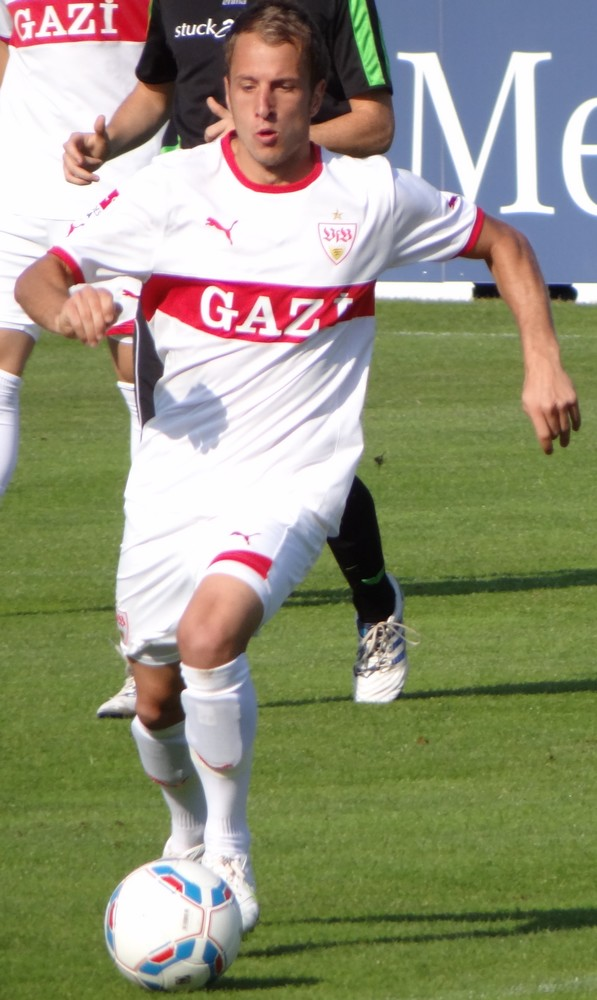

Personal information
- Date of birth: 3 May 1982 (age 44)
- Place of birth: Ostfildern, West Germany
- Height: 1.73 m (5 ft 8 in)
- Position: Midfielder

Youth career
- 1985–1996: TV Nellingen
- 1996–1998: VfL Kirchheim/Teck
- 1998–2001: VfB Stuttgart II

Senior career*
Years	Team	Apps	(Gls)
2001–2006	VfB Stuttgart II	61	(10)
2004–2005	→ FC St.Gallen (loan)	21	(0)
2006–2010	Hansa Rostock	59	(2)
2010–2017	VfB Stuttgart II	238	(18)
Total		379	(30)

Managerial career
- 2017–2018: VfB Stuttgart U19 (assistant)
- 2018–2019: VfB Stuttgart U17 (assistant)
- 2019: VfB Stuttgart (assistant)
- 2019–2020: VfB Stuttgart II (assistant)
- 2020–: VfB Stuttgart U19 (assistant)
- * Club domestic league appearances and goals

Tobias Rathgeb (born 3 May 1982, in Ostfildern) is a German retired football midfielder.

== Career ==
On 6 January 2010, his contract with FC Hansa Rostock was terminated. One day later, he returned to the second team of VfB Stuttgart.
