= 2012–13 SC Paderborn 07 season =

SC Paderborn 07
2012–13 season
- Chairman: Wilfried Finke
- Manager: Stephan Schmidt
- Stadium: Benteler Arena
- 2.Bundesliga: 12th
- DFB-Pokal: First round
- Top goalscorer: League: Philipp Hofmann (7); All: Alban Meha (7); Philipp Hofmann (7)
- Highest home attendance: 15,000
- Lowest home attendance: 5,397
- Average home league attendance: 8,775
Home colours	Away colours

The 2012–13 SC Paderborn 07 season is the 28th season in the club's football history. In 2012–13, the club plays in the 2. Bundesliga, the second tier of German football. It is the club's fourth consecutive season in this league, having played at this level since 2009–10, after it was promoted from the 3. Liga in 2009.

The club also took part in the 2012–13 edition of the DFB-Pokal, the German Cup, but was knocked out in the first round by third division side Arminia Bielefeld.

The club finished the season in 12th place to secure a spot in the following year's 2. Bundesliga.

== Squad ==
Note: Flags indicate national team as defined under FIFA eligibility rules; some limited exceptions apply. Players may hold more than one non-FIFA nationality.

No.	Pos.	Nation	Player
1	GK	(Germany) GER	Lukas Kruse
3	DF	(Germany) GER	Manuel Gulde
4	MF	(Germany) GER	Diego Demme
5	DF	(Germany) GER	Patrick Ziegler
6	MF	(Germany) GER	Manuel Zeitz
7	MF	(Germany) GER	Jens Wemmer
8	MF	(Germany) GER	Mario Vrančić
9	FW	(Germany) GER	Philipp Hofmann (on loan from Schalke 04)
10	FW	(Turkey) TUR	Deniz Yılmaz
11	FW	(Slovenia) SVN	David Poljanec
12	GK	(Germany) GER	Sebastian Lange
13	DF	(Germany) GER	Christian Strohdiek
14	MF	(Germany) GER	Thomas Bertels
15	FW	(Germany) GER	Elias Kachunga (on loan from Borussia Mönchengladbach)

No.	Pos.	Nation	Player
16	FW	(Turkey) TUR	Mahir Sağlık
17	MF	(Albania) ALB	Alban Meha
18	MF	(Germany) GER	Markus Krösche (captain)
19	GK	(Germany) GER	Nico Burchert
21	MF	(Germany) GER	Daniel Brückner
22	DF	(Germany) GER	Tobias Feisthammel
23	DF	(Lithuania) LTU	Markus Palionis
24	MF	(Germany) GER	Niclas Erlbeck
26	MF	(Italy) ITA	Massimo Ornatelli
28	DF	(Germany) GER	Tim Welker
30	DF	(Germany) GER	Jens Wissing
31	MF	(Germany) GER	Deniz Naki
33	GK	(Germany) GER	Daniel Luck

== Transfers ==
=== In ===
Date from	Position	Nationality	Name	From	Fee	Ref.
1 July 2012	CB	GER	Patrick Ziegler	SpVgg Unterhaching	Free transfer	
1 July 2012	AM	GER	Tobias Kempe	Erzgebirge Aue	Free transfer	
1 July 2012	CM	BIH	Mario Vrančić	Borussia Dortmund II	Free transfer	
1 July 2012	CF	SLO	David Poljanec	Blau-Weiß Linz (AUT)	Free transfer	
1 July 2012	AM	ITA	Massimo Ornatelli	Preußen Münster	Free transfer	
1 July 2012	CB	GER	Manuel Gulde	TSG 1899 Hoffenheim	Free transfer	
1 July 2012	CB	GER	Tobias Feisthammel	Alemannia Aachen	Free transfer	
7 January 2013	CF	TUR	Mahir Sağlık	St. Pauli	Free transfer	

=== Loans in ===
Date from	Position	Nationality	Name	From	Date until	Ref.
1 July 2012	CM	GER	Manuel Zeitz	1. FC Nürnberg	30 June 2013	
30 July 2012	CF	GER	Philipp Hofmann	Schalke 04	30 June 2013	
31 July 2012	CF	AZE	Deniz Yılmaz	Mainz 05	30 June 2013	
3 January 2013	RW	DRC	Elias Kachunga	Borussia Mönchengladbach	30 June 2013	

=== Out ===
Date from	Position	Nationality	Name	To	Fee	Ref.
1 July 2012	CF	USA	Matt Taylor	Preußen Münster	Undisclosed	
1 July 2012	CB	GER	Florian Mohr	FC St. Pauli	Free	
1 July 2012	CF	GER	Sven Krause	SC Wiedenbrück	Free	
1 July 2012	AM	TUR	Yasin Kocatepe	SC Pfullendorf	Free	(Note: Kocatepe joined SC Pfullendorf following his release)
1 July 2012	AM	TUR	Mehmet Kara	Gençlerbirliği (TUR)	Undisclosed	
1 July 2012	FB	GER	Sergej Schmik	SV Wilhelmshaven	Free	
1 July 2012	CB	GER	Sören Gonther	FC St. Pauli	Free	
1 July 2012	CF	GER	Sören Brandy	MSV Duisburg	Free	
1 July 2012	AM	KOS	Enis Alushi	1. FC Kaiserslautern	Free	
19 July 2012	CF	GER	Nick Proschwitz	Hull City (ENG)	€3,300,000	
21 January 2013	LW	GER	Christian Rasche	Sportfreunde Lotte	Free	
21 January 2013	AM	GER	Tobias Kempe	Dynamo Dresden	Free	

== Friendly matches ==
Win Draw Loss

4 July 2012 Friendly	Delbrücker SC	1–5	SC Paderborn	Delbrück
19:00	Hesse 62'	Report	Meha 32', 42'; Kempe 60', 62'; Ornatelli 90'	Stadium: AM-Stadion; Attendance: 1,500

22 July 2012 Friendly	Twente	0–1	SC Paderborn	Gronau
14:30		Report	Meha 48'	Stadium: Sportplatz SG Gronau; Attendance: 2,000

29 July 2012 Friendly	SC Paderborn	2–1	Werder Bremen	Paderborn
15:00	Yılmaz 35'; Bertels 74'	Report	Junuzovic 58'	Stadium: Benteler Arena; Attendance: 7,424; Referee: Guido Winkmann

== Competitions ==
=== 2. Bundesliga ===
==== League table ====
Pos	Team	Pld	W	D	L	GF	GA	GD	Pts	Promotion, qualification or relegation
10	FC St. Pauli	34	11	10	13	44	47	−3	43	
11	MSV Duisburg (Note: MSV Duisburg were denied a license for the 2013–14 2. Bundesliga season, and, in accordance with the rules of the DFL (Deutsche Fußball Liga), Duisburg are replaced by the best-placed originally relegated team, SV Sandhausen.) (R)	34	11	10	13	37	49	−12	43	Relegation to 3. Liga
12	SC Paderborn	34	11	9	14	45	45	0	42	
13	FC Ingolstadt 04	34	10	12	12	36	43	−7	42	
14	VfL Bochum	34	10	8	16	40	52	−12	38	

Source: kicker.de
Rules for classification: 1) points; 2) goal difference; 3) number of goals scored.
(R) Relegated

==== Results summary ====
Overall								Home						Away					
Pld	W	D	L	GF	GA	GD	Pts	W	D	L	GF	GA	GD	W	D	L	GF	GA	GD
34	11	9	14	45	45	0	42	5	6	6	24	18	+6	6	3	8	21	27	−6

Last updated: 17 June 2015.
Source: Competitive matches

==== Matches ====
Win Draw Loss

3 August 2012 1	Hertha BSC	2–2	SC Paderborn	Berlin
20:30	Ronny 65'; Allagui 88'	Report	Yılmaz 43'; Meha 86'	Stadium: Olympic Stadium; Attendance: 23,404; Referee: Deniz Aytekin

11 August 2012 2	SC Paderborn	4–0	VfL Bochum	Paderborn
13:00	Vrančić 24', 50'; Meha 40'; Yılmaz 82'	Report		Stadium: Benteler Arena; Attendance: 10,763; Referee: Florian Meyer

24 August 2012 3	Eintracht Braunschweig	2–1	SC Paderborn	Braunschweig
18:00	Dogan 62'; Kruppke 67'	Report	Yılmaz 34'	Stadium: Eintracht-Stadion; Attendance: 19,500; Referee: Robert Hartmann

2 September 2012 4	SC Paderborn	1–3	FC Ingolstadt	Paderborn
13:30	Kempe 85'	Report	Biliskov 16'; Eigler 39'; Caiuby 83'	Stadium: Benteler Arena; Attendance: 7,729; Referee: Christian Bandurski

16 September 2012 5	Erzgebirge Aue	0–1	SC Paderborn	Aue
13:30		Report	Hofmann 51'	Stadium: Sparkassen-Erzgebirgsstadion; Attendance: 8,000; Referee: Martin Petersen

22 September 2012 6	SC Paderborn	3–0	SV Sandhausen	Paderborn
13:00	Kempe 49', 82'; Hofmann 74'	Report		Stadium: Benteler Arena; Attendance: 6,278; Referee: Marcel Unger

25 September 2012 7	Energie Cottbus	2–1	SC Paderborn	Cottbus
17:30	Farina 67'; Stiepermann 80'	Report	Hofmann 74'	Stadium: Stadion der Freundschaft; Attendance: 8,419; Referee: Robert Kempter

28 September 2012 8	SC Paderborn	1–2	1. FC Köln	Paderborn
18:00	Zeitz 53'	Report	Ujah 18'; Chihi 69'	Stadium: Benteler Arena; Attendance: 15,000; Referee: Christian Dingert

5 October 2012 9	FSV Frankfurt	1–1	SC Paderborn	Frankfurt
18:00	Kapllani 90+3'	Report	Hofmann 70'	Stadium: Frankfurter Volksbank-Stadion; Attendance: 3,185; Referee: Benjamin Cortus

21 October 2012 10	SC Paderborn	1–1	FC St. Pauli	Paderborn
13:30	Naki 71'	Report	Ginczek 48'	Stadium: Benteler Arena; Attendance: 15,000; Referee: Martin Petersen

28 October 2012 11	Union Berlin	0–1	SC Paderborn	Berlin
13:30		Report	Naki 75'	Stadium: Stadion An der Alten Försterei; Attendance: 15,738; Referee: Harm Osmers

2 November 2012 12	Jahn Regensburg	0–2	SC Paderborn	Regensburg
18:00		Report	Hofmann 13'; Zeitz 87'	Stadium: Städtisches Jahnstadion; Attendance: 5,410; Referee: Norbert Grudzinski

10 November 2012 13	SC Paderborn	1–1	1. FC Kaiserslautern	Paderborn
13:00	Jessen 75'	Report	Idrissou 67'	Stadium: Benteler Arena; Attendance: 11,417; Referee: Guido Winkmann

17 November 2012 14	VfR Aalen	0–1	SC Paderborn	Aalen
13:30		Report	Gulde 58'	Stadium: Scholz-Arena; Attendance: 5,412; Referee: Bibiana Steinhaus

23 November 2012 15	SC Paderborn	2–2	Dynamo Dresden	Paderborn
18:00	Yılmaz 11'; Schuppan 21'	Report	Ouali 14'; Kitambala 38'	Stadium: Benteler Arena; Attendance: 9,127; Referee: Thorsten Schriever

27 November 2012 16	1860 Munich	1–0	SC Paderborn	Munich
17:30	Lauth 38'	Report		Stadium: Allianz Arena; Attendance: 13,300; Referee: Robert Kampka

2 December 2012 17	SC Paderborn	0–2	MSV Duisburg	Paderborn
13:30		Report	Kern 58'; Perthel 79'	Stadium: Benteler Arena; Attendance: 7,431; Referee: Benjamin Brand

8 December 2013 18	SC Paderborn	0–1	Hertha BSC	Paderborn
13:00		Report	Ramos 65'	Stadium: Benteler Arena; Attendance: 9,416; Referee: Tobias Stielar

16 December 2012 19	VfL Bochum	4–0	SC Paderborn	Bochum
13:30	Aydın 17', 72'; Goretzka 40'; Scheidhauer 80'	Report		Stadium: rewirpowerStadion; Attendance: 10,250; Referee: Sascha Stegemann

2 February 2013 20	SC Paderborn	1–2	Eintracht Braunschweig	Paderborn
13:00	Bertels 90+2'	Report	Petersch 9'; Doğan 74'	Stadium: Benteler Arena; Attendance: 10,709; Referee: Günter Perl

10 February 2013 21	FC Ingolstadt	1–3	SC Paderborn	Ingolstadt
13:30	Mitsanski 68'	Report	Kachunga 27'; Bertels 84'; Meha 87'	Stadium: Audi Sportpark; Attendance: 4,021; Referee: Martin Petersen

15 February 2013 22	SC Paderborn	2–0	Erzgebirge Aue	Paderborn
18:00	Feisthammel 28'; Meha 40'	Report		Stadium: Benteler Arena; Attendance: 5,617; Referee: Christian Dietz

24 February 2013 23	SV Sandhausen	1–3	SC Paderborn	Sandhausen
13:30	Löning 5'	Report	Vrančić 56'; Brückner 66'; Hofmann 90'	Stadium: Hardtwaldstadion; Attendance: 2,300; Referee: Harm Osmers

1 March 2013 24	SC Paderborn	0–1	Energie Cottbus	Paderborn
18:00		Report	Sanogo 50'	Stadium: Benteler Arena; Attendance: 6,535; Referee: Robert Kampka

9 March 2013 25	1. FC Köln	3–0	SC Paderborn	Köln
13:30	Matuschyk 29'; Ujah 64', 83'	Report		Stadium: RheinEnergieStadion; Attendance: 42,700; Referee: Peter Sippel

15 March 2013 26	SC Paderborn	3–0	FSV Frankfurt	Paderborn
18:00	Meha 21'; Görlitz 84' (o.g.); Bertels 90'	Report		Stadium: Benteler Arena; Attendance: 5,397; Referee: Markus Wingenbach

1 April 2013 27	FC St. Pauli	2–2	SC Paderborn	Hamburg
20:15	Ebbers 53'; Tschauner 90'	Report	Yılmaz 56'; Sağlık 84'	Stadium: Millerntor-Stadion; Attendance: 28,278; Referee: Tobias Welz

7 April 2013 28	SC Paderborn	1–1	Union Berlin	Paderborn
13:30	Nemec 27'	Report	Strohdiek 90+2'	Stadium: Benteler Arena; Attendance: 7,590; Referee: Benjamin Brand

14 April 2013 29	SC Paderborn	0–0	Jahn Regensburg	Paderborn
13:30		Report		Stadium: Benteler Arena; Attendance: 6,290; Referee: Bibiana Steinhaus

20 April 2013 30	1. FC Kaiserslautern	3–0	SC Paderborn	Kaiserslautern
13:30	Weiser 18'; Idrissou 54'; Baumjohann 81'	Report		Stadium: Fritz-Walter-Stadion; Attendance: 28,702; Referee: Tobias Stieler

28 April 2013 31	SC Paderborn	2–2	VfR Aalen	Paderborn
13:30	Vrančić 14'; Hofmann 20'	Report	Reichwein 64', 89'	Stadium: Benteler Arena; Attendance: 5,729; Referee: Marcel Unger

3 May 2013 32	Dynamo Dresden	2–1	SC Paderborn	Dresden
18:00	Müller 35', 70'	Report	Meha 43'	Stadium: Glücksgas Stadium; Attendance: 28,315; Referee: Daniel Siebert

12 May 2013 33	SC Paderborn	2–0	1860 Munich	Paderborn
13:30	Sağlık 4'; Kachunga 69'	Report		Stadium: Benteler Arena; Attendance: 9,160; Referee: Norbert Grudzinski

19 May 2013 34	MSV Duisburg	3–2	SC Paderborn	Duisburg
13:30	Perthel 12'; Bajić 60'; Brandy 77'	Report	Kachunga 20'; Vrančić 70'	Stadium: Schauinsland-Reisen-Arena; Attendance: 13,472; Referee: Florian Meyer

==== DFB Pokal ====
Win Draw Loss

19 August 2012 Round 1	Arminia Bielefeld	3–1	SC Paderborn	Bielefeld
16:00	Schütz 55'; Schönfeld 86'; Hübener 90+3'	Report	Meha 36'	Stadium: Schauinsland-Reisen-Arena; Attendance: 18,587; Referee: Markus Wingenbach
