= List of German football transfers summer 2011 =

This is a list of German football transfers in the summer transfer window 2011 by club. Only transfers of the Bundesliga and 2. Bundesliga are included.

== Bundesliga ==
=== Borussia Dortmund ===
In:

Out:

No.	Pos.	Nation	Player
2		DF	Julian Koch loan return from MSV Duisburg
7		MF	Moritz Leitner loan return from FC Augsburg
14		MF	Ivan Perišić from Club Brugge
21		MF	İlkay Gündoğan from 1. FC Nürnberg
24		DF	Chris Löwe from Chemnitzer FC
31		MF	Marvin Bakalorz from Borussia Dortmund II

No.	Pos.	Nation	Player
2		DF	Lasse Sobiech on loan to FC St. Pauli
8		MF	Nuri Şahin to Real Madrid
14		MF	Markus Feulner to 1. FC Nürnberg
17		DF	Dedê to Eskişehirspor
28		FW	Daniel Ginczek on loan to VfL Bochum
30		MF	Tamás Hajnal to VfB Stuttgart, previously on loan
39		FW	Marco Stiepermann on loan to Alemannia Aachen
--		FW	Dimitar Rangelov on loan to Energie Cottbus, previously on loan at Maccabi Tel Aviv

=== Bayer 04 Leverkusen ===
In:

No.	Pos.	Nation	Player
4		DF	Bastian Oczipka loan return from FC St. Pauli
9		FW	André Schürrle from 1. FSV Mainz 05
17		MF	Michael Javier Ortega on loan from Club Atlas
21		DF	Ömer Toprak from SC Freiburg
22		GK	David Yelldell from MSV Duisburg
23		GK	Bernd Leno on loan from VfB Stuttgart
38		FW	Karim Bellarabi from Eintracht Braunschweig

Out:

No.	Pos.	Nation	Player
4		DF	Sami Hyypiä retired
17		DF	Domagoj Vida to Dinamo Zagreb
22		GK	Benedikt Fernandez released
23		MF	Arturo Vidal to Juventus
26		MF	Kevin Kampl to VfL Osnabrück
33		GK	Tomasz Bobel retired
--		MF	Marcel Risse to 1. FSV Mainz 05, previously on loan
--		MF	Zvonko Pamić on loan to MSV Duisburg, previously on loan at SC Freiburg
--		MF	Burak Kaplan to Beşiktaş J.K., previously on loan at SpVgg Greuther Fürth
--		DF	Constant Djakpa to Eintracht Frankfurt, previously on loan at Hannover 96
--		FW	Richard Sukuta-Pasu to 1. FC Kaiserslautern, previously on loan at FC St. Pauli

=== FC Bayern Munich ===
In:

No.	Pos.	Nation	Player
1		GK	Manuel Neuer from Schalke 04
9		FW	Nils Petersen from Energie Cottbus
13		DF	Rafinha from Genoa C.F.C.
14		FW	Takashi Usami on loan from Gamba Osaka
17		DF	Jérôme Boateng from Manchester City
24		GK	Maximilian Riedmüller from Bayern Munich II
27		MF	David Alaba loan return from 1899 Hoffenheim

Out:

No.	Pos.	Nation	Player
8		MF	Hamit Altıntop to Real Madrid
16		MF	Andreas Ottl to Hertha BSC
18		FW	Miroslav Klose to S.S. Lazio
32		MF	Mehmet Ekici to Werder Bremen, previously on loan at 1. FC Nürnberg
35		GK	Thomas Kraft to Hertha BSC

=== Hannover 96 ===
In:

No.	Pos.	Nation	Player
9		FW	Artur Sobiech from Polonia Warszawa
15		MF	Henning Hauger from Stabæk Fotball
16		MF	Daniel Royer from SV Ried
21		GK	Samuel Radlinger from SV Ried
24		MF	Christian Pander from FC Schalke 04
26		MF	Deniz Ayçiçek from Hannover 96 Youth
27		DF	Erdal Akdarı from Hannover 96 Youth

Out:

No.	Pos.	Nation	Player
1		GK	Florian Fromlowitz to MSV Duisburg
15		DF	Constant Djakpa loan return to Bayer 04 Leverkusen
16		MF	DaMarcus Beasley to Puebla F.C.
37		DF	Felix Burmeister to Arminia Bielefeld

=== 1. FSV Mainz 05 ===
In:

No.	Pos.	Nation	Player
3		DF	Zdeněk Pospěch from F.C. Copenhagen
7		MF	Eugen Polanski from Getafe CF, previously on loan
10		FW	Eric Maxim Choupo-Moting from Hamburger SV
11		MF	Yunus Mallı from Borussia Mönchengladbach II
13		FW	Anthony Ujah from Lillestrøm SK
14		MF	Julian Baumgartlinger from FK Austria Wien
17		MF	Zoltán Stieber from Alemannia Aachen
22		FW	Mario Gavranović on loan from FC Schalke 04
23		MF	Marcel Risse from Bayer 04 Leverkusen, previously on loan
24		DF	Malik Fathi from Spartak Moscow, previously on loan
27		MF	Nicolai Müller from SpVgg Greuther Fürth
30		FW	Deniz Yılmaz from Bayern Munich II
34		DF	Fabian Schönheim from Wehen Wiesbaden

Out:

No.	Pos.	Nation	Player
1		GK	Martin Pieckenhagen retired
10		MF	Jan Šimák to FC Carl Zeiss Jena
14		FW	André Schürrle to Bayer 04 Leverkusen
18		MF	Lewis Holtby loan return to FC Schalke 04
21		MF	Miroslav Karhan to Spartak Trnava
22		DF	Christian Fuchs to FC Schalke 04, previously on loan at VfL Bochum
--		DF	Stefan Bell to Eintracht Frankfurt, previously on loan at 1860 Munich
--		MF	Filip Trojan to Dynamo Dresden, previously on loan at MSV Duisburg

=== 1. FC Nürnberg ===
In:

No.	Pos.	Nation	Player
7		MF	Markus Feulner from Borussia Dortmund
9		FW	Tomáš Pekhart from FK Baumit Jablonec, previously on loan at Sparta Prague
15		DF	Timm Klose from FC Thun
20		MF	Daniel Didavi on loan from VfB Stuttgart
28		MF	Manuel Zeitz from 1. FC Saarbrücken
33		FW	Alexander Esswein from Dynamo Dresden

Out:

No.	Pos.	Nation	Player
5		DF	Andreas Wolf to Werder Bremen
11		MF	Marek Mintál to Hansa Rostock
15		MF	Christoph Sauter on loan to VfR Aalen
19		FW	Nassim Ben Khalifa loan return to VfL Wolfsburg
20		MF	Pascal Bieler to Wehen Wiesbaden
22		MF	İlkay Gündoğan to Borussia Dortmund
23		FW	Julian Schieber loan return to VfB Stuttgart
24		GK	Timo Ochs to 1860 Munich
32		GK	Daniel Batz to SC Freiburg
37		MF	Mehmet Ekici loan return to Bayern Munich
--		FW	Dario Vidošić to Adelaide United FC, previously on loan at Arminia Bielefeld
--		DF	Felicio Brown Forbes to Rot-Weiß Oberhausen, previously on loan at FC Carl Zeiss Jena

=== 1. FC Kaiserslautern ===
In:

No.	Pos.	Nation	Player
9		FW	Itay Shechter from Hapoel Tel Aviv F.C.
10		MF	Olcay Şahan from MSV Duisburg
14		MF	Gil Vermouth from Hapoel Tel Aviv F.C.
16		FW	Richard Sukuta-Pasu from Bayer 04 Leverkusen, previously on loan at FC St. Pauli
28		MF	Kostas Fortounis from Asteras Tripolis
30		FW	Dorge Kouemaha on loan from Club Brugge

Out:

No.	Pos.	Nation	Player
4		MF	Bastian Schulz to RB Leipzig
9		FW	Srđan Lakić to VfL Wolfsburg
16		MF	Jan Morávek loan return to FC Schalke 04
24		MF	Adam Hloušek loan return to Slavia Prague
22		MF	Ivo Iličević to Hamburger SV
33		FW	Erwin Hoffer loan return to S.S.C. Napoli

=== Hamburger SV ===
In:

No.	Pos.	Nation	Player
3		DF	Michael Mancienne from Chelsea, previously on loan at Wolverhampton Wanderers
5		DF	Jeffrey Bruma on loan from Chelsea
11		MF	Ivo Iličević from 1. FC Kaiserslautern
16		FW	Marcus Berg loan return from PSV Eindhoven
17		FW	Gökhan Töre from Chelsea Reserves
22		MF	Jacopo Sala from Chelsea
23		DF	Slobodan Rajković from Chelsea FC
25		MF	Per Ciljan Skjelbred from Rosenborg BK
27		MF	Sören Bertram loan return from FC Augsburg
28		MF	Tolgay Arslan loan return from Alemannia Aachen
30		GK	Wolfgang Hesl loan return form SV Ried
42		MF	Mickaël Tavares loan return from Middlesbrough

Out:

No.	Pos.	Nation	Player
1		GK	Frank Rost to New York Red Bulls
5		DF	Joris Mathijsen to Málaga CF
8		MF	Zé Roberto to Al-Gharafa Sports Club
11		FW	Elijero Elia to Juventus
15		MF	Piotr Trochowski to Sevilla FC
17		FW	Eric Maxim Choupo-Moting to 1. FSV Mainz 05
20		DF	Guy Demel to West Ham United
21		MF	Jonathan Pitroipa to Stade Rennais F.C.
22		FW	Ruud van Nistelrooy to Málaga CF
30		DF	Collin Benjamin to 1860 Munich
32		MF	Änis Ben-Hatira to Hertha BSC
35		FW	Tunay Torun to Hertha BSC
--		FW	Macauley Chrisantus on loan to FSV Frankfurt, previously on loan at Karlsruher SC
--		DF	Kai-Fabian Schulz to FC Carl Zeiss Jena, previously on loan at FSV Frankfurt
--		DF	David Rozehnal to Lille OSC, previously on loan

=== SC Freiburg ===
In:

No.	Pos.	Nation	Player
4		DF	Beg Ferati from FC Basel
19		GK	Daniel Batz from 1. FC Nürnberg
29		MF	Christian Bickel from SC Freiburg II
33		FW	Simon Brandstetter from SC Freiburg II
39		FW	Garra Dembélé from Levski Sofia

Out:

No.	Pos.	Nation	Player
1		GK	Simon Pouplin released
13		FW	Tommy Bechmann to SønderjyskE
14		MF	Zvonko Pamić loan return to Bayer 04 Leverkusen
20		MF	Ivica Banović to Energie Cottbus, previously on loan at MSV Duisburg
28		MF	Danny Williams to 1899 Hoffenheim
31		MF	Nicolas Höfler on loan to Erzgebirge Aue
58		DF	Ömer Toprak to Bayer 04 Leverkusen

=== 1. FC Köln ===
In:

No.	Pos.	Nation	Player
5		DF	Sascha Riether from VfL Wolfsburg
17		DF	Henrique Sereno on loan from FC Porto
28		MF	Odise Roshi from KS Flamurtari Vlorë

Out:

No.	Pos.	Nation	Player
3		DF	Youssef Mohamad to Al-Ahli Dubai
6		MF	Taner Yalçın on loan to İstanbul BB
9		FW	Manasseh Ishiaku released, previously on loan at K. Sint-Truidense V.V.
16		DF	Christopher Schorch on loan to Energie Cottbus
18		MF	Kostas Giannoulis on loan to Atromitos F.C.
19		MF	Mato Jajalo loan return to A.C. Siena
22		MF	Fabrice Ehret to Evian Thonon Gaillard F.C.
30		FW	Simon Terodde on loan to 1. FC Union Berlin
32		DF	Stephan Salger to VfL Osnabrück
37		MF	Reinhold Yabo on loan to Alemannia Aachen
--		GK	Thomas Kessler on loan to Eintracht Frankfurt, previously on loan at FC St. Pauli
--		FW	José Pierre Vunguidica on loan to Preußen Münster, previously on loan at Kickers Offenbach
--		MF	Michael Gardawski to VfL Osnabrück, previously on loan at VfB Stuttgart II

=== TSG 1899 Hoffenheim ===
In:

No.	Pos.	Nation	Player
9		FW	Sven Schipplock from VfB Stuttgart
13		MF	Danny Williams from SC Freiburg
16		DF	Fabian Johnson from VfL Wolfsburg
21		MF	Dominik Kaiser from 1899 Hoffenheim II
27		DF	Jukka Raitala loan return form SC Paderborn 07
30		GK	Koen Casteels from K.R.C. Genk
36		MF	Franco Zuculini loan return from Racing Club de Avellaneda
--		FW	Michael Gregoritsch from Kapfenberger SV
8		FW	Knowledge Musona from Kaizer Chiefs

Out:

No.	Pos.	Nation	Player
8		MF	David Alaba loan return to Bayern Munich
14		DF	Josip Šimunić to Dinamo Zagreb
18		FW	Prince Tagoe to Bursaspor, previously on loan at FK Partizan
27		GK	Ramazan Özcan to FC Ingolstadt 04
30		GK	Jens Grahl on loan to SC Paderborn 07
--		FW	Michael Gregoritsch on loan to Kapfenberger SV

=== VfB Stuttgart ===
In:

No.	Pos.	Nation	Player
4		MF	William Kvist from F.C. Copenhagen
14		DF	Maza from PSV Eindhoven
16		MF	Ibrahima Traoré from FC Augsburg
23		FW	Julian Schieber loan return from 1. FC Nürnberg
28		MF	Tamás Hajnal from Borussia Dortmund, previously on loan

Out:

No.	Pos.	Nation	Player
2		DF	Philipp Degen loan return to Liverpool
9		FW	Ciprian Marica to FC Schalke 04
14		MF	Patrick Funk on loan to FC St. Pauli
25		MF	Élson released
26		MF	Daniel Didavi on loan to 1. FC Nürnberg
30		GK	Bernd Leno on loan to Bayer 04 Leverkusen
35		DF	Christian Träsch to VfL Wolfsburg
36		FW	Sven Schipplock to TSG 1899 Hoffenheim

=== Werder Bremen ===
In:

No.	Pos.	Nation	Player
11		FW	Markus Rosenberg loan return from Racing de Santander
13		MF	Lukas Schmitz from FC Schalke 04
17		MF	Aleksandar Ignjovski from OFK Beograd, previously on loan at 1860 Munich
20		MF	Mehmet Ekici from Bayern Munich, previously on loan at 1. FC Nürnberg
22		DF	Sokratis Papastathopoulos on loan from Genoa C.F.C.
23		DF	Andreas Wolf from 1. FC Nürnberg
25		MF	Tom Trybull from Hansa Rostock
30		FW	Márkó Futács loan return from FC Ingolstadt 04
34		MF	Aleksandar Stevanović from FC Schalke 04 Youth

Out:

No.	Pos.	Nation	Player
3		DF	Petri Pasanen to FC Red Bull Salzburg
20		MF	Daniel Jensen released
22		MF	Torsten Frings to Toronto FC
25		DF	Samuel to R.S.C. Anderlecht
28		FW	Kevin Schindler to FC St. Pauli
29		DF	Per Mertesacker to Arsenal F.C.
41		DF	Dominik Schmidt to Eintracht Frankfurt
42		GK	Felix Wiedwald to MSV Duisburg
43		FW	Pascal Testroet to Kickers Offenbach
45		MF	Timo Perthel to Hansa Rostock, previously on loan at Sturm Graz
--		FW	John Jairo Mosquera to 1. FC Union Berlin, previously on loan
--		MF	Peter Niemeyer to Hertha BSC, previously on loan
--		MF	Jurica Vranješ released

=== FC Schalke 04 ===
In:

No.	Pos.	Nation	Player
1		GK	Ralf Fährmann from Eintracht Frankfurt
8		FW	Ciprian Marica from VfB Stuttgart
10		MF	Lewis Holtby loan return from 1. FSV Mainz 05
12		MF	Marco Höger from Alemannia Aachen
13		MF	Jermaine Jones loan return from Blackburn Rovers
16		MF	Jan Morávek loan return from 1. FC Kaiserslautern
20		FW	Teemu Pukki from HJK Helsinki
23		DF	Christian Fuchs from 1. FSV Mainz 05

Out:

No.	Pos.	Nation	Player
1		GK	Manuel Neuer to Bayern Munich
5		DF	Nicolas Plestan released
8		MF	Hao Junmin to Shandong Luneng Taishan F.C.
9		FW	Edu on loan to Beşiktaş J.K.
10		MF	Ali Karimi to Persepolis
13		DF	Lukas Schmitz to Werder Bremen
15		FW	Angelos Charisteas to Panetolikos F.C.
19		FW	Mario Gavranović on loan to 1. FSV Mainz 05
20		MF	Vasileios Pliatsikas on loan to MSV Duisburg
23		DF	Danilo Avelar loan return to Karpaty Lviv
24		MF	Christian Pander to Hannover 96
27		MF	Ciprian Deac on loan to Rapid București
40		MF	Anthony Annan on loan to Vitesse Arnhem
--		MF	Tore Reginiussen to Odense BK, previously on loan at Tromsø IL
--		FW	Gerald Asamoah released, previously on loan at FC St. Pauli

=== VfL Wolfsburg ===
In:

No.	Pos.	Nation	Player
2		DF	Patrick Ochs from Eintracht Frankfurt
6		MF	Aleksandr Hleb from FC Barcelona, previously on loan at Birmingham City
9		FW	Srđan Lakić from 1. FC Kaiserslautern
10		MF	Thomas Hitzlsperger from West Ham United
11		DF	Hasan Salihamidžić from Juventus FC
15		DF	Christian Träsch from VfB Stuttgart
16		DF	Sotirios Kyrgiakos from Liverpool
20		FW	Rasmus Jönsson from Helsingborgs IF
22		MF	Mateusz Klich from Cracovia
23		DF	Marco Russ from Eintracht Frankfurt
25		DF	Chris from Eintracht Frankfurt
26		DF	Hrvoje Čale from Trabzonspor

Out:

No.	Pos.	Nation	Player
11		MF	Cícero loan return to Tombense
15		MF	Karim Ziani to Kayserispor, previously on loan
16		DF	Fabian Johnson to 1899 Hoffenheim
22		MF	Kevin Wolze to MSV Duisburg
23		FW	Grafite to Al-Ahli Dubai
25		FW	Dieumerci Mbokani loan return to AS Monaco
27		MF	Akaki Gogia on loan to FC Augsburg
28		MF	Diego on loan to Atlético Madrid
34		DF	Simon Kjær on loan to A.S. Roma
37		DF	Sergei Karimov to MSV Duisburg
--		FW	Nassim Ben Khalifa on loan to BSC Young Boys, previously on loan at 1. FC Nürnberg

=== Borussia Mönchengladbach ===
In:

No.	Pos.	Nation	Player
2		DF	Matthias Zimmermann from Karlsruher SC
8		MF	Lukas Rupp from Karlsruher SC
9		MF	Raúl Bobadilla loan return from Aris Thessaloniki
15		FW	Joshua King on loan from Manchester United
17		DF	Oscar Wendt from F.C. Copenhagen
20		FW	Mathew Leckie from Adelaide United
23		MF	Yuki Otsu from Kashiwa Reysol
26		MF	Michael Bradley loan return from Aston Villa

Out:

No.	Pos.	Nation	Player
2		DF	Sebastian Schachten to FC St. Pauli
5		DF	Anderson Bamba on loan to Eintracht Frankfurt
6		MF	Michael Fink loan return to Beşiktaş J.K.
20		DF	Jean-Sébastien Jaurès retired
23		DF	Christian Dorda to SpVgg Greuther Fürth
25		FW	Mohamadou Idrissou to Eintracht Frankfurt
27		DF	Jens Wissing to SC Paderborn 07
29		FW	Fabian Bäcker to Alemannia Aachen
30		GK	Logan Bailly on loan to Neuchâtel Xamax
40		FW	Karim Matmour to Eintracht Frankfurt
--		MF	Marcel Meeuwis to VVV-Venlo, previously on loan at Feyenoord

=== Hertha BSC ===
In:

No.	Pos.	Nation	Player
7		DF	Maik Franz from Eintracht Frankfurt
8		MF	Andreas Ottl from Bayern Munich
11		FW	Tunay Torun from Hamburger SV
17		MF	Änis Ben-Hatira from Hamburger SV
18		MF	Peter Niemeyer from Werder Bremen, previously on loan
24		DF	John Brooks from Hertha BSC II
33		FW	Abu-Bakarr Kargbo from Hertha BSC II
35		GK	Thomas Kraft from Bayern Munich

Out:

No.	Pos.	Nation	Player
15		MF	Sascha Bigalke to SpVgg Unterhaching
16		FW	Rob Friend to Eintracht Frankfurt
17		FW	Valeri Domovchiyski to MSV Duisburg
25		DF	Lennart Hartmann to Alemannia Aachen
27		MF	Marvin Knoll on loan to Dynamo Dresden
--		MF	Daniel Beichler on loan to MSV Duisburg, previously on loan at FC St. Gallen
--		DF	Kaká on loan to APOEL, previously on loan at S.C. Braga

=== FC Augsburg ===
In:

No.	Pos.	Nation	Player
15		DF	Sebastian Langkamp from Karlsruher SC
19		FW	Patrick Mayer from 1. FC Heidenheim
21		DF	Dominic Peitz from 1. FC Union Berlin
22		FW	Edmond Kapllani loan return from SC Paderborn 07
25		FW	Dawda Bah from HJK Helsinki
26		MF	Lorenzo Davids from NEC
28		MF	Akaki Gogia on loan from VfL Wolfsburg
33		FW	Sascha Mölders from FSV Frankfurt

Out:

No.	Pos.	Nation	Player
14		MF	Kees Kwakman to FC Groningen
16		MF	Ibrahima Traoré to VfB Stuttgart
19		MF	Sören Bertram loan return to Hamburger SV
21		DF	Dominic Peitz on loan to Hansa Rostock
22		DF	Lukas Sinkiewicz to VfL Bochum
27		FW	Michael Thurk released
28		MF	Moritz Leitner loan return to Borussia Dortmund
33		MF	Daniel Framberger to TSV Neusäß

== 2. Bundesliga ==
=== Eintracht Frankfurt ===
In:

No.	Pos.	Nation	Player
4		DF	Gordon Schildenfeld from SK Sturm Graz
5		DF	Stefan Bell from 1. FSV Mainz 05, previously on loan at 1860 Munich
6		DF	Dominik Schmidt from Werder Bremen
8		MF	Matthias Lehmann from FC St. Pauli
10		FW	Erwin Hoffer on loan from S.S.C. Napoli, previously on loan at 1. FC Kaiserslautern
11		MF	Ümit Korkmaz loan return form VfL Bochum
15		DF	Constant Djakpa from Bayer 04 Leverkusen, previously on loan at Hannover 96
18		FW	Mohammadou Idrissou from Borussia Mönchengladbach
19		DF	Habib Bellaïd loan return from CS Sedan Ardennes
21		FW	Karim Matmour from Borussia Mönchengladbach
22		GK	Thomas Kessler on loan from 1. FC Köln, previously on loan at FC St. Pauli
23		DF	Anderson Bamba on loan from Borussia Mönchengladbach
25		FW	Marcos Alvarez from Bayern Munich II
--		FW	Rob Friend from Hertha BSC

Out:

No.	Pos.	Nation	Player
2		DF	Patrick Ochs to VfL Wolfsburg
3		DF	Nikola Petković to Red Star Belgrade, previously on loan at Al-Ahli
4		DF	Maik Franz to Hertha BSC
10		MF	Halil Altıntop to Trabzonspor
17		FW	Martin Fenin to Energie Cottbus
18		FW	Ioannis Amanatidis released
19		DF	Kevin Kraus to SpVgg Greuther Fürth
22		GK	Ralf Fährmann to FC Schalke 04
23		DF	Marco Russ to VfL Wolfsburg
25		MF	Marcel Heller to Dynamo Dresden
29		DF	Chris to VfL Wolfsburg

=== FC St. Pauli ===
In:

No.	Pos.	Nation	Player
3		DF	Lasse Sobiech on loan from Borussia Dortmund
6		MF	Patrick Funk on loan from VfB Stuttgart
13		GK	Philipp Tschauner from 1860 Munich
19		FW	Mahir Sağlık from VfL Bochum
20		DF	Sebastian Schachten from Borussia Mönchengladbach
25		MF	Kevin Schindler from Werder Bremen

Out:

No.	Pos.	Nation	Player
2		DF	Florian Lechner to Karlsruher SC
6		DF	Bastian Oczipka loan return to Bayer 04 Leverkusen
13		FW	Gerald Asamoah loan return to FC Schalke 04
14		DF	Marcel Eger to Brentford F.C.
19		FW	Richard Sukuta-Pasu loan return to Bayer 04 Leverkusen
20		MF	Matthias Lehmann to Eintracht Frankfurt
25		GK	Mathias Hain retired
26		GK	Thomas Kessler loan return to 1. FC Köln
32		DF	Davidson Drobo-Ampem on loan to Esbjerg fB, previously on loan

=== VfL Bochum ===
In:

No.	Pos.	Nation	Player
6		DF	Lukas Sinkiewicz from FC Augsburg
11		MF	Takashi Inui from Cerezo Osaka
14		MF	Denis Berger from Kickers Offenbach
15		DF	Hólmar Örn Eyjólfsson from West Ham United F.C.
21		FW	Daniel Ginczek on loan from Borussia Dortmund
23		MF	Christoph Kramer on loan from Bayer 04 Leverkusen II
26		DF	Jonas Acquistapace from VfL Bochum II
32		MF	Enes Uzun from VfL Wolfsburg Youth
34		GK	Jonas Ermes from VfL Bochum II

Out:

No.	Pos.	Nation	Player
11		FW	Mahir Sağlık to FC St. Pauli
15		FW	Roman Prokoph to Kapfenberger SV
20		MF	Ümit Korkmaz loan return to Eintracht Frankfurt
23		MF	Marc Rzatkowski on loan to Arminia Bielefeld
25		DF	Antar Yahia to Al Nassr FC
27		FW	Zlatko Dedič on loan to Dynamo Dresden
--		GK	Daniel Fernandes released, previously on loan at Panserraikos F.C.
--		DF	Christian Fuchs to 1. FSV Mainz 05, previously on loan
--		FW	Stanislav Šesták to MKE Ankaragücü, previously on loan

=== SpVgg Greuther Fürth ===
In:

No.	Pos.	Nation	Player
4		DF	Kevin Kraus from Eintracht Frankfurt
6		MF	Heinrich Schmidtgal from Rot-Weiß Oberhausen
10		MF	Sebastian Tyrała from VfL Osnabrück
18		DF	Christian Dorda from Borussia Mönchengladbach
21		MF	Robert Zillner from SpVgg Unterhaching
22		FW	Dani Schahin loan return from Dynamo Dresden
25		FW	Olivier Occean from Kickers Offenbach

Out:

No.	Pos.	Nation	Player
6		DF	Kim Falkenberg to Alemannia Aachen
10		FW	Miroslav Slepička loan return to Dinamo Zagreb
11		MF	Burak Kaplan loan return to Bayer 04 Leverkusen
18		MF	Leonhard Haas to FC Ingolstadt
22		GK	Alexander Walke loan return to Red Bull Salzburg
27		MF	Nicolai Müller to 1. FSV Mainz 05
28		FW	Stefan Vogler on loan to Kickers Offenbach

=== FC Erzgebirge Aue ===
In:

No.	Pos.	Nation	Player
7		FW	Ronny König from Rot-Weiß Oberhausen
8		FW	Mike Könnecke form VfL Wolfsburg II
9		FW	Christian Cappek from Wacker Burghausen
23		MF	Nicolas Höfler on loan from SC Freiburg
25		FW	Guido Koçer from SV Babelsberg 03

Out:

No.	Pos.	Nation	Player
3		DF	Tomasz Kos retired
7		DF	Thomas Birk to Chemnitzer FC
31		MF	Patrick Milchraum to Karlsruher SC

=== Energie Cottbus ===
In:

No.	Pos.	Nation	Player
3		MF	Ivica Banović from SC Freiburg, previously on loan at MSV Duisburg
6		FW	Charles Uchenna Nwaogu from Flota Świnoujście
8		FW	Dimitar Rangelov on loan from Borussia Dortmund, previously on loan at Maccabi Tel Aviv
9		FW	Mustafa Kučuković from SønderjyskE
11		MF	Alexander Ludwig from 1860 Munich
19		FW	Tobias Steffen on loan from Bayer 04 Leverkusen II
20		MF	Konstantin Engel from VfL Osnabrück
22		FW	Martin Fenin from Eintracht Frankfurt
37		MF	Christian Müller from Arminia Bielefeld
--		DF	Christopher Schorch on loan from 1. FC Köln

Out:

No.	Pos.	Nation	Player
6		MF	Nils Miatke to FC Carl Zeiss Jena
7		DF	Takahito Soma to Vissel Kobe
9		FW	Emil Jula to MSV Duisburg
20		MF	Shao Jiayi to MSV Duisburg
22		MF	Heiko Schwarz to Wacker Burghausen
26		FW	Nils Petersen to Bayern Munich

=== Fortuna Düsseldorf ===
In:

No.	Pos.	Nation	Player
1		GK	Robert Almer from Austria Wien
3		DF	Juanan from Real Madrid Castilla
4		MF	Karim Aouadhi from Club Africain
10		FW	Ken Ilsø from FC Midtjylland, previously on loan
16		FW	Villyan Bijev on loan from Liverpool F.C.
20		FW	Adriano Grimaldi from 1. FSV Mainz 05 II
23		FW	Robbie Kruse from Melbourne Victory
26		MF	Jules Schwadorf on loan from Bayer 04 Leverkusen II
33		GK	Markus Krauss from VfB Stuttgart II

Out:

No.	Pos.	Nation	Player
1		GK	Michael Melka to Rot-Weiß Oberhausen
3		MF	Claus Costa to VfL Osnabrück
4		DF	Tiago to Newcastle Jets
10		MF	Marco Christ to SV Wehen Wiesbaden
15		FW	Patrick Zoundi to 1. FC Union Berlin
19		FW	Marcel Gaus to FSV Frankfurt

=== MSV Duisburg ===
In:

No.	Pos.	Nation	Player
2		MF	Vasileios Pliatsikas on loan from FC Schalke 04
3		DF	Markus Bollmann from Arminia Bielefeld
7		MF	Daniel Brosinski from Wehen Wiesbaden
9		FW	Valeri Domovchiyski from Hertha BSC
10		MF	Jürgen Gjasula from FSV Frankfurt
13		DF	Sergei Karimov from VfL Wolfsburg
17		MF	Kevin Wolze from VfL Wolfsburg
23		GK	Florian Fromlowitz from Hannover 96
27		FW	Emil Jula from Energie Cottbus
28		MF	Daniel Beichler on loan from Hertha BSC, previously on loan at FC St. Gallen
32		FW	Flamur Kastrati from FC Twente, previously on loan at VfL Osnabrück
33		MF	Shao Jiayi from Energie Cottbus
--		DF	Stephen Hennen from MSV Duisburg II
--		GK	Felix Wiedewald from Werder Bremen
--		DF	Džemal Berberović from Litex Lovech

Out:

No.	Pos.	Nation	Player
1		GK	Marcel Herzog released
2		DF	Julian Koch loan return to Borussia Dortmund
4		MF	Ivica Banović loan return to SC Freiburg
10		MF	Filip Trojan loan return to 1. FSV Mainz 05
11		MF	Olcay Şahan to 1. FC Kaiserslautern
18		GK	David Yelldell to Bayer 04 Leverkusen
19		FW	Stefan Maierhofer loan return to Wolverhampton Wanderers
20		MF	Ivica Grlić retired
22		FW	Manuel Schäffler loan return to 1860 Munich
24		MF	Kevin Grund to Rot-Weiss Essen
28		DF	Olivier Veigneau released
32		MF	Sefa Yılmaz to Kayserispor
--		MF	Michael Blum to Hansa Rostock, previously on loan
--		MF	Yannick Stark to FSV Frankfurt, previously on loan at SV Darmstadt 98

=== TSV 1860 Munich ===
In:

No.	Pos.	Nation	Player
--		FW	Manuel Schäffler loan return from MSV Duisburg
--		MF	Eke Uzoma loan return form Arminia Bielefeld
--		MF	Sandro Kaiser loan return from Arminia Bielefeld
--		MF	Arne Feick from Arminia Bielefeld
--		DF	Dennis Malura from Rot-Weiß Erfurt
--		GK	Timo Ochs from 1. FC Nürnberg
--		DF	Collin Benjamin from Hamburger SV

Out:

No.	Pos.	Nation	Player
3		DF	Stefan Bell loan return to 1. FSV Mainz 05
8		MF	Aleksandar Ignjovski loan return to OFK Beograd
12		GK	Philipp Tschauner to FC St. Pauli
14		MF	Florin Lovin released
18		MF	Alexander Ludwig to Energie Cottbus
24		DF	Tobias Schilk on loan to 1. FC Heidenheim

=== Alemannia Aachen ===
In:

No.	Pos.	Nation	Player
2		DF	Kim Falkenberg form SpVgg Greuther Fürth
3		DF	Andreas Korte from Alemannia Aachen II
4		MF	Kevin Maek from Werder Bremen II
6		MF	Bas Sibum from NEC
7		FW	Marco Stiepermann on loan from Borussia Dortmund
10		FW	Anouar Hadouir from Roda JC
11		FW	Fabian Bäcker from Borussia Mönchengladbach
12		GK	Boy Waterman from AZ, previously on loan at De Graafschap
14		DF	Mario Erb from Bayern Munich II
18		DF	Jonas Strifler from Dynamo Dresden
22		DF	Lennart Hartmann from Hertha BSC
--		FW	Henrik Ojamaa loan return from Fortuna Sittard
--		MF	Reinhold Yabo on loan from 1. FC Köln

Out:

No.	Pos.	Nation	Player
2		DF	Nico Herzig to Wehen Wiesbaden
7		MF	Zoltán Stieber to 1. FSV Mainz 05
10		MF	Thorsten Burkhardt to Wehen Wiesbaden
14		FW	Babacar Gueye on loan to FSV Frankfurt
18		MF	Tolgay Arslan loan return to Hamburger SV
21		FW	Juvhel Tsoumou to Preston North End F.C.
37		MF	Marco Höger to FC Schalke 04

=== 1. FC Union Berlin ===
In:

No.	Pos.	Nation	Player
9		FW	John Jairo Mosquera from Werder Bremen, previously on loan
--		MF	Markus Karl from FC Ingolstadt 04
--		FW	Simon Terodde on loan from 1. FC Köln
--		FW	Patrick Zoundi from Fortuna Düsseldorf
--		MF	Marc Pfertzel from AO Kavala
--		FW	Silvio from FC Zürich, previously on loan at FC Lausanne-Sport

Out:

No.	Pos.	Nation	Player
3		DF	Dominic Peitz to FC Augsburg
6		DF	Bernd Rauw to Rot-Weiß Erfurt
8		MF	Macchambes Younga-Mouhani released
10		FW	Santi Kolk on loan to NAC Breda
11		FW	Kenan Şahin released
13		GK	Christoph Haker to Berlin AK 07
14		MF	Paul Thomik released
22		FW	Karim Benyamina to FSV Frankfurt
23		MF	Björn Brunnemann released

=== SC Paderborn 07 ===
In:

No.	Pos.	Nation	Player
8		FW	Matt Taylor from Rot Weiss Ahlen
9		FW	Nick Proschwitz from FC Thun
10		MF	Mehmet Kara from Preußen Münster
14		FW	Thomas Bertels from SC Verl
17		MF	Alban Meha from Eintracht Trier
24		GK	Jens Grahl on loan from 1899 Hoffenheim
30		DF	Jens Wissing from Borussia Mönchengladbach
31		FW	Sven Krause loan return form 1. FC Saarbrücken
--		GK	Sebastian Lange loan return from SC Wiedenbrück 2000

Out:

No.	Pos.	Nation	Player
3		DF	Jukka Raitala loan return to 1899 Hoffenheim
4		DF	Toni Wachsmuth to Chemnitzer FC
10		FW	Edmond Kapllani loan return to FC Augsburg
22		GK	Daniel Masuch to Preußen Münster
25		MF	Stefan Parensen released
27		DF	Thomas Rath to SC Paderborn 07 II
34		MF	Adrian Jevrić released

=== FSV Frankfurt ===
In:

No.	Pos.	Nation	Player
8		MF	Vyacheslav Hleb from Dinamo Minsk
22		FW	Karim Benyamina from 1. FC Union Berlin
--		FW	Marcel Gaus from Fortuna Düsseldorf
--		GK	Pierre Kleinheider from 1. FSV Mainz 05 II
--		DF	Nils Texeira from Kickers Offenbach
--		MF	Daniel Gordon from Rot-Weiß Oberhausen
--		MF	Ju Tae Yun from Yonsei University
--		DF	Alexander Huber from Kickers Offenbach
--		FW	Babacar Gueye on loan from Alemannia Aachen
--		DF	Alexander Ujma from FSV Frankfurt Youth
--		DF	Tobias Henneböle from FSV Frankfurt Youth
--		FW	Macauley Chrisantus on loan from Hamburger SV, previously on loan at Karlsruher SC
--		MF	Yannick Stark from MSV Duisburg, previously on loan at SV Darmstadt 98
--		MF	Zafer Yelen from Trabzonspor

Out:

No.	Pos.	Nation	Player
4		DF	Kai-Fabian Schulz loan return to Hamburger SV
6		MF	Christian Müller to RB Leipzig
7		MF	Jaouhar Mnari released
8		MF	Mike Wunderlich on loan to Viktoria Köln
9		FW	Sascha Mölders to FC Augsburg
10		MF	Jürgen Gjasula to FC Augsburg
15		FW	Uğur Albayrak released
17		DF	Stefan Hickl to Kickers Offenbach
19		GK	Pablo Álvarez released
24		MF	Benjamin Pintol released
27		FW	Aziz Bouhaddouz to SV Wehen Wiesbaden
30		FW	Cidimar to Dynamo Dresden

=== FC Ingolstadt 04 ===
In:

No.	Pos.	Nation	Player
3		DF	Andreas Schäfer from Karlsruher SC
7		MF	Christoph Knasmüllner from Internazionale
8		MF	Leonhard Haas from SpVgg Greuther Fürth
13		MF	José-Alex Ikeng from Werder Bremen II
20		DF	Kristoffer Andersen from VfL Osnabrück
21		GK	Ramazan Özcan from 1899 Hoffenheim
22		FW	Ahmed Akaïchi from Étoile du Sahel

Out:

No.	Pos.	Nation	Player
2		DF	Amaechi Igwe released
8		MF	Markus Karl to 1. FC Union Berlin
11		FW	Sebastian Zielinsky released
12		GK	Michael Lutz to Waldhof Mannheim
21		FW	Márkó Futács loan return to Werder Bremen

=== Karlsruher SC ===
In:

No.	Pos.	Nation	Player
--		MF	Marcus Piossek from Rot Weiss Ahlen
--		DF	Dennis Kempe form VfR Aalen
--		GK	Dirk Orlishausen from Rot-Weiß Erfurt
--		FW	Anton Fink loan return from VfR Aalen
--		FW	Bogdan Müller from FC Schalke 04 II
--		FW	Moses Lamidi from Rot-Weiß Oberhausen
--		MF	Patrick Milchraum from Erzgebirge Aue
--		MF	Timo Kern from Karlsruher SC II
--		DF	Florian Lechner from FC St. Pauli
--		MF	Steffen Haas from Kickers Offenbach
--		DF	Niklas Hoheneder from Sparta Prague, previously on loan at Austria Wien
--		FW	Klemen Lavrič from FC St. Gallen
--		DF	Giuseppe Aquaro from CSKA Sofia

Out:

No.	Pos.	Nation	Player
2		DF	Matthias Zimmermann to Borussia Mönchengladbach
5		DF	Christian Demirtas released
6		MF	Stefan Rieß to FC Lustenau 07
8		MF	Michael Mutzel released
10		MF	Massimilian Porcello released
11		DF	Andreas Schäfer to FC Ingolstadt 04
15		FW	Niklas Tarvajärvi on loan to Turun Palloseura
18		FW	Macauley Chrisantus loan return to Hamburger SV
19		FW	Serhat Akın released
22		MF	Marco Engelhardt released
23		DF	Matthias Langkamp released
24		DF	Sebastian Langkamp to FC Augsburg
26		MF	Lukas Rupp to Borussia Mönchengladbach
29		GK	Kristian Nicht released
41		FW	Denis Omerbegović released
42		DF	Kiliann Witschi released
45		DF	Martin Hudec to VfL Osnabrück

=== Eintracht Braunschweig ===
In:

No.	Pos.	Nation	Player
18		MF	Oliver Petersch from Rot-Weiß Oberhausen
20		MF	Nico Zimmermann from 1. FC Saarbrücken
21		FW	Pierre Merkel from SC Idar-Oberstein

Out:

No.	Pos.	Nation	Player
10		FW	Marco Calamita to VfR Aalen
20		MF	Dennis Lemke to FC Carl Zeiss Jena
21		MF	Patrick Amrhein to SpVgg Unterhaching
38		FW	Karim Bellarabi to Bayer Leverkusen

=== Hansa Rostock ===
In:

No.	Pos.	Nation	Player
2		DF	Pavel Košťál from SC Wiener Neustadt
11		MF	Marek Mintál from 1. FC Nürnberg
17		MF	Timo Perthel from Werder Bremen, previously on loan at Sturm Graz
18		MF	Michael Blum from MSV Duisburg, previously on loan
33		FW	Tino Semmer from Rot-Weiß Erfurt

Out:

No.	Pos.	Nation	Player
9		MF	Daniel Becker released
11		FW	Enrico Neitzel to Anker Wismar
14		FW	Malick Bolivard to SV Babelsberg 03
17		DF	René Lange released
21		GK	Andreas Kerner to RB Leipzig
23		MF	Hendrik Großöhmichen released
24		MF	Tom Trybull to Werder Bremen
32		DF	Martin Stoll to Dynamo Dresden

=== Dynamo Dresden ===
In:

No.	Pos.	Nation	Player
1		GK	Dennis Eilhoff from Arminia Bielefeld
3		MF	Alexander Schnetzler from VfL Osnabrück
4		DF	Cheikh Gueye from FC Metz
5		DF	Romain Brégerie from FC Metz, previously on loan at LB Châteauroux
7		MF	Marcel Heller from Eintracht Frankfurt
8		MF	Filip Trojan from 1. FSV Mainz 05, previously on loan at MSV Duisburg
9		MF	Pavel Fořt from Arminia Bielefeld
10		FW	Mickaël Poté from OGC Nice, previously on loan at Le Mans FC
16		DF	Martin Stoll from Hansa Rostock
18		FW	Cidimar from FSV Frankfurt
19		MF	Yiannis Papadopoulos from Olympiacos
20		MF	Marvin Knoll on loan from Hertha BSC
22		FW	Zlatko Dedič on loan from VfL Bochum
33		DF	Jens Möckel from Rot-Weiß Erfurt
37		DF	Toni Leistner from Dynamo Dresden II

Out:

No.	Pos.	Nation	Player
1		GK	Axel Keller to Heidenauer SV
3		DF	Tim Kister to VfR Aalen
4		MF	Denny Herzig to Eintracht Trier
5		DF	Thomas Hübener to Arminia Bielefeld
8		MF	Timo Röttger to RB Leipzig
10		FW	Dani Schahin loan return to SpVgg Greuther Fürth
18		MF	Jonas Strifler to Alemannia Aachen
20		MF	Thomas Franke to TSG Neustrelitz
21		DF	Dennis Bührer to Bahlinger SC
22		DF	Florian Grossert to SV Babelsberg 03
26		MF	Maik Wagefeld to Hallescher FC
33		FW	Alexander Esswein to 1. FC Nürnberg

== See also ==
- 2011–12 Bundesliga
- 2011–12 2. Bundesliga
