= 2014–15 SC Paderborn 07 season =

SC Paderborn 07
2014–15 season
- Chairman: Wilfried Finke
- Manager: André Breitenreiter
- Stadium: Benteler Arena
- Bundesliga: 18th (relegated)
- DFB-Pokal: First round
Home colours	Away colours	Third colours

The 2014–15 SC Paderborn 07 season was the club's first ever season in the Bundesliga.

== Summary ==
After four rounds of the season, Paderborn were leading the Bundesliga table on eight points after two wins and two draws.

== Current squad ==
Note: Flags indicate national team as defined under FIFA eligibility rules; some limited exceptions apply. Players may hold more than one non-FIFA nationality.

No.	Pos.	Nation	Player
1	GK	GER	Lukas Kruse
2	DF	GER	Uwe Hünemeier (captain)
3	DF	ESP	Rafa
4	DF	GER	Lukas Rupp
5	DF	GER	Patrick Ziegler
6	MF	GER	Marvin Bakalorz
7	MF	GER	Jens Wemmer
8	MF	GER	Mario Vrančić
9	FW	GER	Stefan Kutschke
10	FW	TUR	Mahir Sağlık
11	MF	GER	Moritz Stoppelkamp
12	GK	GER	Alexander Nübel
13	DF	GER	Christian Strohdiek
14	MF	GER	Thomas Bertels
15	FW	GER	Elias Kachunga

No.	Pos.	Nation	Player
17	MF	ALB	Alban Meha
19	GK	GER	Nico Burchert
20	MF	GER	Marc Vucinovic
21	MF	GER	Daniel Brückner
22	DF	GER	Michael Heinloth
23	MF	MNE	Mirnes Pepić
24	FW	GER	Viktor Maier
25	DF	GER	Martin Amedick
26	DF	GER	Florian Hartherz
27	MF	ALG	Idir Ouali
28	DF	GER	Tim Welker
30	MF	GER	Süleyman Koç
33	GK	GER	Daniel Lück
34	FW	GER	Marvin Ducksch (on loan from Dortmund)

=== Players out on loan ===
Note: Flags indicate national team as defined under FIFA eligibility rules; some limited exceptions apply. Players may hold more than one non-FIFA nationality.

No.	Pos.	Nation	Player
29	FW	NED	Rick ten Voorde (at FC Dordrecht)
31	FW	GER	Saliou Sané (at Holstein Kiel)
—	MF	GER	Sebastian Schonlau (at SC Verl)

== Transfers ==
=== In ===
Note: Flags indicate national team as defined under FIFA eligibility rules; some limited exceptions apply. Players may hold more than one non-FIFA nationality.

No.	Pos.	Nation	Player
3	DF	ESP	Rafa (from Getafe)
4	DF	GER	Lukas Rupp (from Borussia Mönchengladbach)
6	MF	GER	Marvin Bakalorz (from Eintracht Frankfurt)
9	FW	GER	Stefan Kutschke (from Wolfsburg)
11	MF	GER	Moritz Stoppelkamp (from TSV 1860 München)
15	FW	GER	Elias Kachunga (from Borussia Mönchengladbach)
27	MF	ALG	Idir Ouali (from Dynamo Dresden)

=== Out ===
Note: Flags indicate national team as defined under FIFA eligibility rules; some limited exceptions apply. Players may hold more than one non-FIFA nationality.

No.	Pos.	Nation	Player
—	MF	GER	Manuel Zeitz (at Energie Cottbus)
—	DF	LTU	Markus Palionis

== Competitions ==
=== Bundesliga ===
==== League table ====
Pos	Team	Pld	W	D	L	GF	GA	GD	Pts	Qualification or relegation
14	VfB Stuttgart	34	9	9	16	42	60	−18	36	
15	Hertha BSC	34	9	8	17	36	52	−16	35	
16	Hamburger SV (O)	34	9	8	17	25	50	−25	35	Qualification for the relegation play-offs
17	SC Freiburg (R)	34	7	13	14	36	47	−11	34	Relegation to 2. Bundesliga
18	SC Paderborn (R)	34	7	10	17	31	65	−34	31	Relegation to 2. Bundesliga

Source: DFB
Rules for classification: 1) points; 2) goal difference; 3) number of goals scored
(O) Play-off winners; (R) Relegated

==== Results summary ====
Overall								Home						Away					
Pld	W	D	L	GF	GA	GD	Pts	W	D	L	GF	GA	GD	W	D	L	GF	GA	GD
32	7	10	15	30	62	−32	31	4	6	6	20	29	−9	3	4	9	10	33	−23

Last updated: 10 May 2015.
Source: Competitive matches

==== Results by round ====
Round	1	2	3	4	5	6	7	8	9	10	11	12	13	14	15	16	17	18	19	20	21	22	23	24	25	26	27	28	29	30	31	32	33	34
Ground	H	A	H	H	A	H	A	H	A	H	A	H	A	H	A	H	A	A	H	A	A	H	A	H	A	H	A	H	A	H	A	H	A	H
Result	D	W	D	W	L	L	D	W	L	W	L	D	L	D	D	L	D	L	L	D	W	L	L	L	L	D	L	W	L	D	W	L	L	L
Position	6	2	5	1	7	11	9	7	8	7	9	10	11	10	10	12	10	13	14	15	12	15	16	16	16	17	17	16	16	17	15	17		18

Updated to match(es) played on 10 May 2015. Source: Competitive matches
A = Away; H = Home; W = Win; D = Draw; L = Loss

==== Matches ====
24 August 2014 1	SC Paderborn 07	2–2	1. FSV Mainz 05	Paderborn
15:30 CEST (UTC+02:00)	Kachunga 37'; Brückner (yellow card) 44'; Vrančić (yellow card) 61'; Hünemeier 87'	Report	Okazaki 33'; Brosinki (yellow card) 45'; Park Joo-Ho (yellow card) 67'; Koo 90' (pen.)	Stadium: Benteler Arena; Attendance: 14,824; Referee: Peter Sippel

30 August 2014 2	Hamburger SV	0–3	SC Paderborn 07	Hamburg
15:30 CEST (UTC+02:00)		Report	Kachunga 29'; Vrančić 68'; Stoppelkamp 87'	Stadium: Volksparkstadion; Attendance: 54,553; Referee: Bastian Dankert

13 September 2014 3	SC Paderborn 07	0–0	1. FC Köln	Paderborn
15:30 CEST (UTC+02:00)		Report	Zoller (yellow card) 40'; Lehmann (yellow card) 52'	Stadium: Benteler Arena; Attendance: 14,993; Referee: Peter Gagelmann

20 September 2014 4	SC Paderborn 07	2–0	Hannover 96	Paderborn
15:30 CEST (UTC+02:00)	Kachunga 71'; Stoppelkamp 90' (yellow card) 90'	Report		Stadium: Benteler Arena; Attendance: 15,000; Referee: Knut Kircher

23 September 2014 5	FC Bayern Munich	4–0	SC Paderborn 07	Munich
20:00 CEST (UTC+02:00)	Götze 8', 78'; Lewandowski 14'; Müller 85'	Report		Stadium: Allianz Arena; Attendance: 71,000; Referee: Sascha Stegemann

27 September 2014 6	SC Paderborn 07	1–2	Borussia Mönchengladbach	Paderborn
15:30 CEST (UTC+02:00)	Vrančić (yellow card) 44'; Wemmer 70'	Report	Herrmann 8'; Raffael 14'; Sommer (yellow card) 88'	Stadium: Benteler Arena; Attendance: 15,000; Referee: Marco Fritz

4 October 2014 7	Bayer 04 Leverkusen	2–2	SC Paderborn 07	Leverkusen
15:30 CEST (UTC+02:00)	Jedvaj (yellow card) 24'; Bender 42' (yellow card) 44'; Son (yellow card) 53'; Bellarabi 90'	Report	Hünemeier (yellow card) 6'; Koç 20'; Bakalorz (red card) 72'; Brückner (yellow card) 80'; Stoppelkamp 87'; Rupp (yellow card) 90+3'	Stadium: BayArena; Attendance: 30,210; Referee: Günter Perl

19 October 2014 8	SC Paderborn 07	3–1	Eintracht Frankfurt	Paderborn
17:30 CEST (UTC+02:00)	Ducksch 66'; Hünemeier 79'; Kutschke 85'	Report	Ignjovski (yellow card) 37'; Meier 66'	Stadium: Benteler Arena; Attendance: 15,000; Referee: Deniz Aytekin

25 October 2014 9	TSG 1899 Hoffenheim	1–0	SC Paderborn 07	Sinsheim
15:30 CEST (UTC+02:00)	Volland 73' (yellow card) 88'; Schipplock (yellow card) 85'	Report	Heinloth (yellow card) 80'; Ouali (yellow card) 82'; Kachunga (yellow card) 87'	Stadium: Rhein-Neckar Arena; Attendance: 25,712; Referee: Robert Hartmann

2 November 2014 10	SC Paderborn 07	3–1	Hertha BSC	Paderborn
17:30 CET (UTC+01:00)	Bakalorz 28'; Kachunga 52'; Meha 75'	Report	Pekarík (yellow card) 30'; Kalou 41'; Niemeyer (yellow card) 42'	Stadium: Benteler Arena; Attendance: 14,630; Referee: Jochen Drees

8 November 2014 11	FC Augsburg	3–0	SC Paderborn 07	Augsburg
15:30 CET (UTC+01:00)	Werner 7', 47'; Feulner (yellow card) 31'; Callsen-Bracker 68'; Baba (yellow card) 89'	Report	Bakalorz (yellow card) 32'; Stoppelkamp (yellow card) 39'; Ziegler (yellow card) 45'	Stadium: SGL arena Attendance: 27,755; Referee: Daniel Siebert

22 November 2014 12	SC Paderborn 07	2–2	Borussia Dortmund	Paderborn
15:30 CET (UTC+01:00)	Rupp 60'; Bakalorz (yellow card) 64'; Hartherz (yellow card) 76'; Sağlık 81' (yellow card) 85'	Report	Aubameyang 12' (yellow card) 84'; Reus 45+1'	Stadium: Benteler Arena; Attendance: 15,000; Referee: Wolfgang Stark

29 November 2014 13	SV Werder Bremen	4–0	SC Paderborn 07	Bremen
15:30 CET (UTC+01:00)				Stadium: Weserstadion; Attendance: 41,800; Referee: Knut Kircher

6 December 2014 14	SC Paderborn 07	1–1	SC Freiburg	Paderborn
15:30 CET (UTC+01:00)	Kachunga (yellow card) 60' (goal) 89'; Sağlık (yellow card) 90'	Report	Darida 18' (pen.) (yellow card) 74'; Höfler (yellow card) 63'; Mehmedi (yellow card) 77'; Guédé (yellow card) 90+3'	Stadium: Benteler Arena; Attendance: 14,738; Referee: Peter Sippel

14 December 2014 15	VfL Wolfsburg	1–1	SC Paderborn 07	Wolfsburg
17:30 CET (UTC+01:00)	Rafa 17' (o.g.); Perišić (yellow card) 20'; Naldo (yellow card) 50'; Luiz Gustavo (yellow card) 57'; Arnold (yellow card) 73'	Report	Hünemeier (yellow card) 24'; Strohdiek (yellow card) 29'; Meha 51' (pen.)	Stadium: Volkswagen Arena; Attendance: 26,044; Referee: Manuel Gräfe

17 December 2014 16	SC Paderborn 07	1–2	FC Schalke 04	Paderborn
20:00 CET (UTC+01:00)	Ayhan 31' (o.g.)	Report	Choupo-Moting 44'; Aogo (yellow card) 48'; Ayhan (yellow card) 67'; Neustädter (yellow card) 71' (goal) 78'	Stadium: Benteler Arena; Attendance: 15,000; Referee: Marco Fritz

20 December 2014 17	VfB Stuttgart	0–0	SC Paderborn 07	Stuttgart
15:30 CET (UTC+01:00)	Didavi (yellow card) 61'	Report	Vrančić (yellow card) 6'; Stoppelkamp (yellow card) 16'; Rupp (yellow card) 42'	Stadium: Mercedes-Benz Arena; Attendance: 55,000; Referee: Tobias Stieler

31 January 2015 18	1. FSV Mainz 05	5–0	SC Paderborn 07	Mainz
15:30 CET (UTC+01:00)	Mallı 6', 46' de Blasis 69'; Allagui 82'; Geis 87' (pen.)	Report	Rafa (yellow card) 32'	Stadium: Coface Arena; Attendance: 27,114; Referee: Robert Hartmann

4 February 2015 19	SC Paderborn 07	0–3	Hamburger SV	Paderborn
20:00 CET (UTC+01:00)	Ziegler (yellow card) 1'	Report	Van der Vaart 2' (pen.); Stieber (yellow card) 15' (goal) 90+1'; Jiráček (yellow card) 31'; Jansen 72'	Stadium: Benteler Arena; Attendance: 15,000; Referee: Peter Gagelmann

7 February 2015 20	1. FC Köln	0–0	SC Paderborn 07	Cologne
15:30 CET (UTC+01:00)	Lehmann (yellow card) 79'	Report	Meha (yellow card) 55'; Stoppelkamp (yellow card) 88'	Stadium: RheinEnergieStadion; Attendance: 49,500; Referee: Christian Dingert

15 February 2015 21	Hannover 96	1–2	SC Paderborn 07	Hanover
17:30 CET (UTC+01:00)	Schulz (yellow card) 33'; Marcelo 66'; Sané (yellow card) 78'; Pereira (yellow card) 90+2'	Report	Heinloth (yellow card) 58'; Lakić 72'; Meha 79'	Stadium: Niedersachsenstadion; Attendance: 38,300; Referee: Jochen Drees

21 February 2015 22	SC Paderborn 07	0–6	FC Bayern Munich	Paderborn
15:30 CET (UTC+01:00)	Hartherz (red card) 62'	Report	Lewandowski 24', 37'; Robben 63' (pen.), 86'; Ribéry 72'; Weiser 78'	Stadium: Benteler Arena; Attendance: 15,000; Referee: Bastian Dankert

1 March 2015 23	Borussia Mönchengladbach	2–0	SC Paderborn 07	Mönchengladbach
15:30 CET (UTC+01:00)	Johnson 18'; Herrmann 81'	Report	Rupp (yellow card) 54'; Vrančić (yellow card) 62'	Stadium: Borussia-Park; Attendance: 53,152; Referee: Michael Weiner

8 March 2015 24	SC Paderborn 07	0–3	Bayer 04 Leverkusen	Paderborn
17:30 CET (UTC+01:00)	Ziegler (yellow card) 61'	Report	Spahić (yellow card) 36'; Papadopoulos 73'; Son 84', 90+3'	Stadium: Benteler Arena; Attendance: 14,905; Referee: Daniel Siebert

14 March 2015 25	Eintracht Frankfurt	4–0	SC Paderborn 07	Frankfurt
15:30 CET (UTC+01:00)	Stendera (yellow card) 15' (goal) 42'; Meier 27'; Aigner (yellow card) 55'; Valdez 82' (yellow card) 82'	Report	Strohdiek (yellow card) 24'; Koç (yellow card) 25'; Kutschke (yellow card) 45+2'; Hünemeier (yellow card) 58'; Lakić (yellow card) 84'; Kachunga (yellow card) 89'	Stadium: Commerzbank-Arena; Attendance: 46,000; Referee: Guido Winkmann

21 March 2015 26	SC Paderborn 07	0–0	TSG 1899 Hoffenheim	Paderborn
15:30 CET (UTC+01:00)		Report	Bičakčić (yellow card) 55' (yellow-red card) 65'; Rudy (yellow card) 83'; Modeste (yellow card) 90+1'	Stadium: Benteler Arena; Attendance: 14,401; Referee: Markus Schmidt

5 April 2015 27	Hertha BSC	2–0	SC Paderborn 07	Berlin
17:30 CEST (UTC+02:00)	Stocker 68'; Beerens (yellow card) 71'; Schulz 88'	Report	Brückner (yellow card) 18'; Ziegler (yellow card) 50'; Rafa (yellow card) 67'; Lakić (yellow card) 80'	Stadium: Olympiastadion; Attendance: 44,031; Referee: Peter Sippel

11 April 2015 28	SC Paderborn 07	2–1	FC Augsburg	Paderborn
15:30 CEST (UTC+02:00)	Hünemeier (yellow card) 16'; Kachunga 48'; Lakić 60'	Report	Højbjerg 52' (yellow card) 84'; Parker (yellow card) 82'	Stadium: Benteler Arena; Attendance: 14,446; Referee: Tobias Stieler

18 April 2015 29	Borussia Dortmund	3–0	SC Paderborn 07	Dortmund
15:30 CEST (UTC+02:00)	Hummels (yellow card) 7'; Mkhitaryan 48'; Aubameyang 55'; Kagawa 80'	Report		Stadium: Westfalenstadion; Attendance: 80,667; Referee: Felix Brych

26 April 2015 30	SC Paderborn 07	2–2	SV Werder Bremen	Paderborn
15:30 CEST (UTC+02:00)	Vrančić 25' (yellow card) 72'; Stoppelkamp 27'; Heinloth (yellow card) 33' (yellow-red card) 78'	Report	Bargfrede (yellow card) 35'; Selke 45'; Hajrović 75'	Stadium: Benteler Arena; Attendance: 15,000; Referee: Florian Meyer

2 May 2015 31	SC Freiburg	1–2	SC Paderborn 07	Freiburg im Breisgau
15:30 CEST (UTC+02:00)	Petersen 40'; Schuster (yellow card) 67'	Report	Brückner (yellow card) 38'; Rupp 70', 80'; Kachunga (yellow card) 83'; Ziegler (yellow card) 89'	Stadium: Dreisamstadion; Attendance: 24,000; Referee: Manuel Gräfe

10 May 2015 32	SC Paderborn 07	1–3	VfL Wolfsburg	Paderborn
15:30 CEST (UTC+02:00)	Rupp 90+1'	Report	Klose 16'; Dost 25', 82' (yellow card) 72'; Caligiuri (yellow card) 46'; Perišić (yellow card) 77'	Stadium: Benteler Arena; Attendance: 14,659; Referee: Markus Schmidt

16 May 2015 33	FC Schalke 04	1–0	SC Paderborn 07	Gelsenkirchen
15:30 CEST (UTC+02:00)	Farfán (yellow card) 56'; Hünemeier 88' (o.g.); Goretzka (yellow card) 90+2'; Nastasić (yellow card) 90+3'	Report	Brückner (yellow card) 55'; Ziegler (yellow card) 90'	Stadium: Veltins-Arena; Attendance: 61,973; Referee: Bastian Dankert

23 May 2015 34	SC Paderborn 07	1–2	VfB Stuttgart	Paderborn
15:30 CEST (UTC+02:00)	Vucinovic 4'; Stoppelkamp (yellow card) 77'; Lakić (yellow card) 85'	Report	Didavi 36'; Ginczek 72' (yellow card) 79'; Kostić (yellow card) 90+2'	Stadium: Benteler Arena; Attendance: 15,000; Referee: Deniz Aytekin

=== DFB-Pokal ===
17 August 2014 Round 1	RB Leipzig	2–1 (a.e.t.)	SC Paderborn 07	Leipzig
18:30 CEST (UTC+02:00)	Jung 43'; Frahn (yellow card) 60'; Khedira (yellow card) 99'; Fandrich 109'	Report	Hartherz (yellow card) 17'; Koç 27'; Bakalorz (yellow card) 29'; Ziegler (yellow card) 88'; Strohdiek (yellow card) 102'	Stadium: Red Bull Arena; Attendance: 24,438; Referee: Harm Osmers
