= Gökhan Töre =

Turkish-German footballer (born 1992)

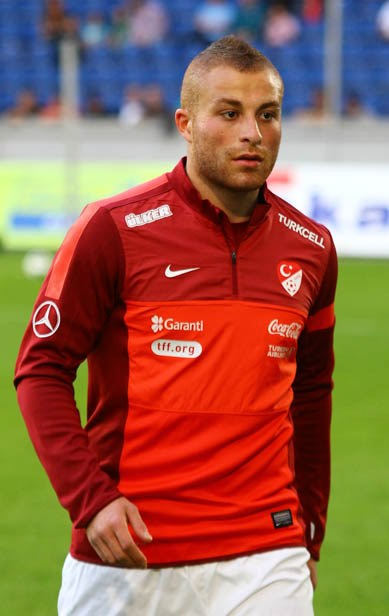
- Töre in 2013

Personal information
- Date of birth: 20 January 1992 (age 34)
- Place of birth: Cologne, Germany
- Height: 1.76 m (5 ft 9 in)
- Position: Winger

Youth career
- 1999–2003: SV Adler Dellbrück
- 2003–2009: Bayer Leverkusen
- 2009–2011: Chelsea

Senior career*
| Years | Team | Apps | (Gls) |
| 2011–2012 | Hamburger SV | 22 | (0) |
| 2012–2014 | Rubin Kazan | 5 | (0) |
| 2013–2014 | → Beşiktaş (loan) | 30 | (4) |
| 2014–2019 | Beşiktaş | 55 | (8) |
| 2016–2017 | → West Ham United (loan) | 5 | (0) |
| 2019–2020 | Yeni Malatyaspor | 23 | (1) |
| 2020–2022 | Beşiktaş | 32 | (3) |
| 2022–2023 | Adana Demirspor | 3 | (1) |
| 2023 | Ankaragücü | 3 | (0) |
| 2023–2024 | Konyaspor | 3 | (0) |

International career
| 2007 | Turkey U15 | 3 | (0) |
| 2007–2008 | Turkey U16 | 14 | (1) |
| 2008 | Turkey U17 | 18 | (3) |
| 2009–2010 | Turkey U21 | 2 | (0) |
| 2011 | Turkey A2 | 1 | (0) |
| 2011–2015 | Turkey | 26 | (0) |
- * Club domestic league appearances and goals

Gökhan Töre (Turkish pronunciation: [ɟœcˈhan ˈtœɾe]; born 20 January 1992) is a Turkish-German former professional footballer who plays as a winger.

Töre began his club career at Hamburger SV before joining Russian Premier League side Rubin Kazan in the summer of 2012. He made only seven first-team appearances for Rubin Kazan and in June 2013, the midfielder went on loan to Turkish club Beşiktaş. In 2014, Töre signed for Beşiktaş permanently on a five-year deal.

Born in Germany, he has been capped over 20 times for Turkey since making his debut in 2011.

== Early years ==
Töre was discovered by Frank Arnesen, former head talent scout of Chelsea, when he was playing for the Bayer Leverkusen youth team. Töre mostly spent his time in the reserves, where he helped his team to win the Premier Reserve League and Premier Reserve League South in the 2010–11 season. He made the most appearances during the season, along with Milan Lalkovič, with 16 starts and he also scored four goals. He had been selected for 13 matchday squads during the 2010–11 season, but was not able to make his senior league debut for the team. Töre made his debut for Chelsea in a pre-season game against Crystal Palace coming on as a 76th-minute substitute for Daniel Sturridge.

== Club career ==
=== Hamburger SV ===
Töre joined Hamburger SV from Chelsea, becoming the third player to switch between the two sides during the 2011 summer transfer period, following Jacopo Sala and Michael Mancienne. On 30 July 2011, Töre made his competitive debut against VfB Oldenburg in Marschweg-Stadion in a DFB-Pokal Round 1 encounter that resulted in a 2–1 win for HSV. Töre made his senior league debut in the Hamburg starting line-up against Borussia Dortmund in the 2011–12 season opener, on 6 August 2011. Before December, Töre managed six assists in 17 games.

=== Rubin Kazan ===
On 26 July 2012, Töre completed a transfer to Russian club Rubin Kazan, signing a four-year deal. He was sent off for the first time in his career on 23 September 2012 in a 1–0 home win over Kuban Krasnodar.

=== Beşiktaş ===
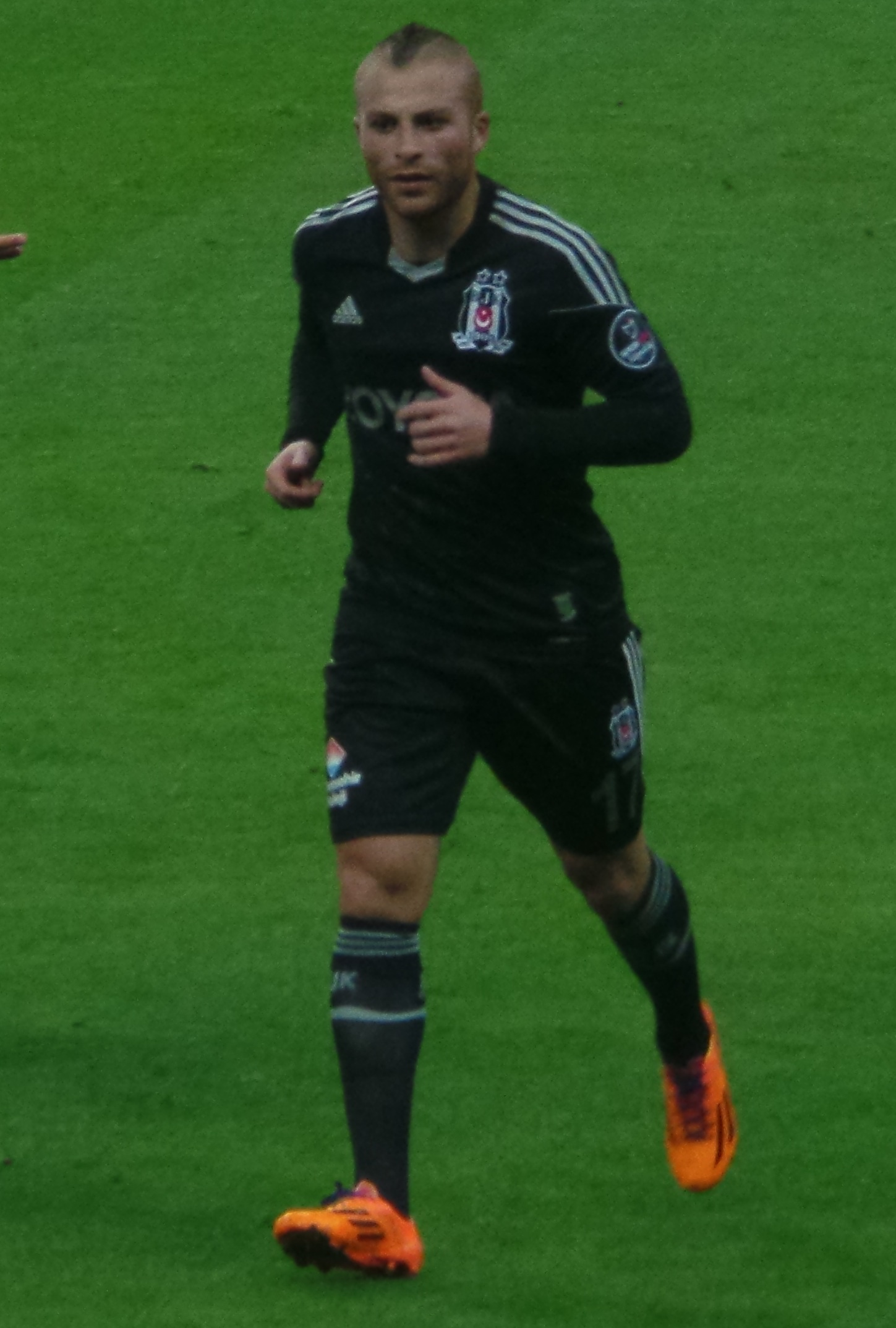
Töre in action for Beşiktaş in February 2014

In June 2013, Töre signed a season-long loan deal with Beşiktaş, scoring his first goal on his debut against Trabzonspor in a 2–0 home win. On 27 August 2013, Töre netted his second goal against Kayseri Erciyesspor in a 4–2 away win.

In early August 2014, Töre joined Beşiktaş permanently on a five-year deal for a transfer fee believed to be about €4.5 million.

==== Loan to West Ham United ====
On 11 July 2016, West Ham United confirmed the signing of Töre from Beşiktaş on a season-long loan with a view to a permanent deal. He joined the Hammers for a fee of £2.5 million with an option to buy for a further £10 million. On 21 August 2016, he provided his first assist in a West Ham shirt with a cross from the left wing, assisting Michail Antonio's 85th-minute header which decided the game against Bournemouth as West Ham won 1–0. He played his last game for West Ham on 1 October 2016, against Middlesbrough In October 2016, he picked up a femoral injury which was estimated to keep him out of the game for five weeks. The injury kept him out of the team for the remainder of the season. His loan ended with him having played eight times only for West Ham; five in the Premier League, two in the Europa League, against Astra Giurgiu, and once in the EFL Cup, against Accrington Stanley. Töre attributed the start of his season-long injury problems to an aggressive tackle from a teammate at a pre-season training camp.

=== Yeni Malatyaspor ===
In July 2019, Töre joined Yeni Malatyaspor on a 1+1 year contract.

=== Ankaragücü ===
On 5 March 2023, Töre signed with Ankaragücü until the end of the 2022–23 season.

=== Konyaspor ===
On 19 September 2023, Töre signed with Konyaspor.

== International career ==
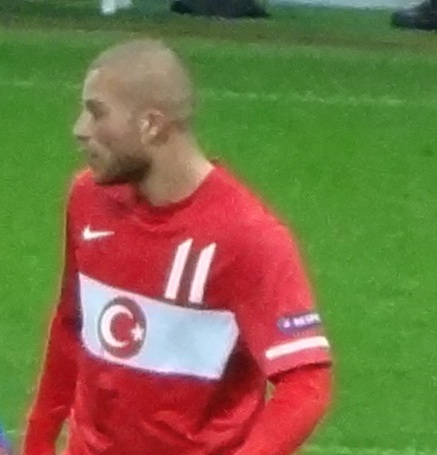
Töre playing for Turkey in 2011

Töre has been a member of the Turkey national team at several age levels since 2007. In 2008, he was part of the national team squad at the UEFA Euro Under-17 Football Championship, in which Turkey were beaten by France on penalties in the semi-finals. Töre also played against France, later subbed in the 41st minute. When he was 17, he was called up to the under-21 team in September 2009, during the 2011 UEFA European Under-21 Championship qualification campaign. He was subbed on for Tunay Torun in the 36th minute against Georgia.

Turkey manager, Guus Hiddink – having seen Töre's performances in training when the duo were both at Chelsea – told Töre that he liked his performances and that he had potential, and suggested he joined the A2 national team first to improve himself. Töre was called up to the senior team for the first time by Hiddink in May 2011 for the Euro 2012 qualification match against Belgium. He made his debut for the national team on 10 August 2011 in a friendly match against Estonia in Istanbul. On 2 September 2011, he was subbed on for team captain Emre Belözoğlu in the 60th minute, against Kazakhstan in a Euro 2012 qualification encounter, which ended in a 2–1 victory for Turkey.

== Personal life ==
Töre was born in Cologne, the oldest of three siblings, to Turkish parents from Samsun, Turkey. In an interview, he stated that he likes the playing style of Sergio Agüero and Lionel Messi. From October 2017 to June 2019, he was married to Turkish actress Esra Bilgiç. In February 2020, he married architect Buket Büyükdere. Their first child, a daughter named Adel, was born in January 2021.

=== Controversies ===
Töre and a friend allegedly entered the national team hotel in October 2013 after Turkey's World Cup qualifying match against the Netherlands and threatened both Ömer Toprak and Hakan Çalhanoğlu with a firearm. Töre had allegedly been stewing over a reported affair between his former girlfriend and Ömer Toprak's friend. The incident was made public by Çalhanoğlu in an interview with German TV station ZDF. In June 2015, Çalhanoğlu and Töre reconciled.

In the early hours of 21 April 2014, Töre was accidentally shot in a nightclub in Istanbul. The winger sustained a shoulder injury and later required surgery.

== Career statistics ==
=== Club ===
As of match played 18 January 2022

Appearances and goals by club, season and competition
| Club | Season | League | | | National cup (Note: Includes DFB-Pokal and Turkish Cup.) | | League cup (Note: Includes EFL Cup.) | | Continental (Note: Includes UEFA Europa League and UEFA Champions League.) | | Total | |
| Club | Season | Division | Apps | Goals | Apps | Goals | Apps | Goals | Apps | Goals | Apps | Goals |
|---|---|---|---|---|---|---|---|---|---|---|---|---|
| Hamburger SV | 2011–12 | Bundesliga | 22 | 0 | 2 | 0 | — | | — | | 24 | 0 |
| Rubin Kazan | 2012–13 | Russian Premier League | 5 | 0 | 0 | 0 | — | | 2 | 0 | 7 | 0 |
| Beşiktaş (loan) | 2013–14 | Süper Lig | 30 | 4 | 1 | 0 | — | | 2 | 0 | 33 | 4 |
| Beşiktaş | 2014–15 | Süper Lig | 28 | 4 | 3 | 1 | — | | 12 | 4 | 43 | 9 |
| Beşiktaş | 2015–16 | Süper Lig | 24 | 4 | 6 | 1 | — | | 5 | 1 | 35 | 6 |
| Beşiktaş | 2017–18 | Süper Lig | 1 | 0 | 0 | 0 | — | | 0 | 0 | 1 | 0 |
| Beşiktaş | 2018–19 | Süper Lig | 2 | 0 | 0 | 0 | — | | 6 | 0 | 8 | 0 |
| Beşiktaş | Total | | 108 | 13 | 12 | 3 | — | | 28 | 5 | 148 | 21 |
| West Ham United (loan) | 2016–17 | Premier League | 5 | 0 | 0 | 0 | 1 | 0 | 2 | 0 | 8 | 0 |
| Yeni Malatyaspor | 2019–20 | Süper Lig | 23 | 1 | 2 | 1 | — | | 3 | 0 | 28 | 2 |
| Beşiktaş | 2020–21 | Süper Lig | 20 | 3 | 1 | 0 | — | | 1 | 0 | 22 | 3 |
| Beşiktaş | 2021–22 | Süper Lig | 12 | 0 | 0 | 0 | — | | 4 | 0 | 16 | 0 |
| Beşiktaş | Total | | 32 | 3 | 1 | 0 | — | | 5 | 0 | 38 | 3 |
| Career total | | | 172 | 16 | 15 | 3 | 1 | 0 | 37 | 5 | 225 | 24 |

=== International ===
As of match played 13 October 2015

Appearances and goals by national team and year
| National team | Year | Apps | Goals |
|---|---|---|---|
| Turkey | 2011 | 7 | 0 |
| Turkey | 2012 | 6 | 0 |
| Turkey | 2013 | 6 | 0 |
| Turkey | 2014 | 3 | 0 |
| Turkey | 2015 | 4 | 0 |
| Total | | 26 | 0 |

== Honours ==
Beşiktaş

- Süper Lig: 2015–16, 2020–21
- Türkiye Kupası: 2020–21
- Turkish Super Cup: 2021

Turkey

- UEFA Under-17 Championship: Semi Finalists: 2008

Individual

- Süper Lig Team of the Season: 2014–15
