= Stefan Hickl =

German footballer

Personal information
- Date of birth: 11 April 1988 (age 38)
- Place of birth: Frankfurt, West Germany
- Height: 1.89 m (6 ft 2 in)
- Position: Defender

Team information
- Current team: SG Ober-Erlenbach

Youth career
- –2001: TSG 51 Frankfurt
- 2001–2003: SV Viktoria Preußen 07
- 2003–2006: FSV Frankfurt

Senior career*
Years	Team	Apps	(Gls)
2006–2011	FSV Frankfurt	45	(0)
2006–2011	FSV Frankfurt II	22	(2)
2011–2012	Kickers Offenbach	15	(0)
2012	FSV Frankfurt II	8	(0)
2013	SV Darmstadt 98	13	(0)
2013–2015	Viktoria Köln	15	(0)
2015	TuS Koblenz	14	(0)
2015–2017	TuS Merzhausen	30	(3)
2017–2018	SF Friedrichsdorf	8	(2)
2018–2019	TuS Merzhausen	12	(0)
2020–	SG Ober-Erlenbach	0	(0)
- * Club domestic league appearances and goals

Stefan Hickl (born 11 April 1988 in Frankfurt am Main) is a German footballer who plays for SG Ober-Erlenbach. He played in the 2. Bundesliga for FSV Frankfurt.
