= Yasin Kocatepe =

Turkish footballer

Personal information
- Date of birth: 8 September 1991 (age 35)
- Place of birth: Fulda, Germany
- Height: 1.87 m (6 ft 2 in)
- Position: Midfielder

Youth career
- SC Borussia Fulda
- SC Paderborn

Senior career*
Years	Team	Apps	(Gls)
2011–2012	SC Paderborn	1	(0)
2012–2013	SC Pfullendorf	17	(0)
2013	Orduspor	1	(0)
2013–2014	Altınordu	2	(1)
Total		21	(1)
- * Club domestic league appearances and goals

Yasin Kocatepe (born 8 September 1991) is a German former professional footballer who played as a midfielder. He made his Süper Lig debut on 11 May 2013.
