= Tobias Henneböle =

German footballer

Personal information
- Date of birth: 19 May 1992 (age 34)
- Place of birth: Bad Soden, Germany
- Height: 1.92 m (6 ft 4 in)
- Position: Centre-back

Youth career
- 1997–2004: JFC Werheim
- 2004–2008: Eintracht Frankfurt
- 2008–2011: FSV Frankfurt

Senior career*
Years	Team	Apps	(Gls)
2011–2012	FSV Frankfurt II	25	(1)
2012–2015	VfL Wolfsburg II	73	(3)
2015–2016	Mallorca	1	(0)
2016–2017	Eintracht Trier	18	(0)
2017–2018	Borussia Fulda	31	(2)
Total		148	(6)
- * Club domestic league appearances and goals

Tobias Henneböle (born 19 May 1992) is a German former professional footballer who played as a central defender.

== Club career ==
Born in Bad Soden, Henneböle started his career at JFC Werheim in 1997, aged five. In 2004, he moved to Eintracht Frankfurt, being four years in the club's youth setup before joining FSV Frankfurt.

Henneböle made his senior debuts with the latter's B-side in the 2010–11 campaign, in Regionalliga. On 29 August 2012, he moved to another reserve team, VfL Wolfsburg II in the same division.

In July 2015 Henneböle joined RCD Mallorca on a trial basis, and signed a two-year deal with the club on 3 August. He made his professional debut on 22 August, playing the full 90 minutes in a 2–0 Segunda División away loss against AD Alcorcón.
