= Sergej Schmik =

German footballer

Personal information
- Date of birth: 27 November 1989 (age 36)
- Place of birth: Olgino, Soviet Union
- Height: 1.79 m (5 ft 10 in)
- Position: Full-back

Youth career
- 1996–2005: SSG Paderborn
- 2005–2010: SC Paderborn

Senior career*
Years	Team	Apps	(Gls)
2010–2012	SC Paderborn	1	(0)
2012–2013	SV Wilhelmshaven	17	(0)
2013–2014	SV Meppen	48	(2)
2014–2018	Hessen Kassel	126	(7)
2018–2021	SC Verl	39	(0)
Total		231	(9)

Managerial career
- 2020–: SC Verl (assistant)
- * Club domestic league appearances and goals

Sergej Schmik (born 27 November 1989) is a German former professional footballer and coach who is assistant manager of SC Verl. He played as a full-back and had a spell in the 2. Bundesliga with SC Paderborn 07.

== Career ==
After starting his career at SC Paderborn 07, Schmik joined SV Wilhelmshaven in the summer of 2012. He left Wilhemshaven in January 2013 to join SV Meppen. In the summer of 2014, he signed for Hessen Kassel. After making over 100 appearances for the club over a four-year period, Schmik signed for SC Verl in summer 2018. In 2020 Schmik became the assistant manager at SC Verl alongside his playing duties.
