= Süleyman Koç =

Turkish-German footballer

Personal information
- Date of birth: 9 June 1989 (age 37)
- Place of birth: Berlin, Germany
- Height: 1.78 m (5 ft 10 in)
- Position: Right winger

Youth career
- –2007: Berliner AK 07

Senior career*
Years	Team	Apps	(Gls)
2007–2008	Berliner AK 07	13	(1)
2008–2010	Türkiyemspor Berlin	61	(9)
2010–2011	SV Babelsberg 03	26	(2)
2012–2014	SV Babelsberg 03	43	(10)
2014–2016	SC Paderborn 07	69	(5)
2017–2019	Çaykur Rizespor	54	(10)
2019–2021	Adana Demirspor	31	(1)
2021–2025	Erzurumspor	68	(4)
2025	Adanaspor	6	(0)
- * Club domestic league appearances and goals as of 15 June 2025

Süleyman Koç (born 9 June 1989) is a Turkish-German footballer.

Koç was sentenced in December 2011 by the Landgericht Berlin to three years and nine months in prison for a number of robberies and battery. In the summer of 2012, he was moved to an open prison, thus being able to return to playing for SV Babelsberg 03. In January 2014, he joined 2. Bundesliga club SC Paderborn 07.

On 10 January 2019, Koç joined Adana Demirspor on a 2.5-year contract.
