= Jens Wissing =

German footballer (born 1988)

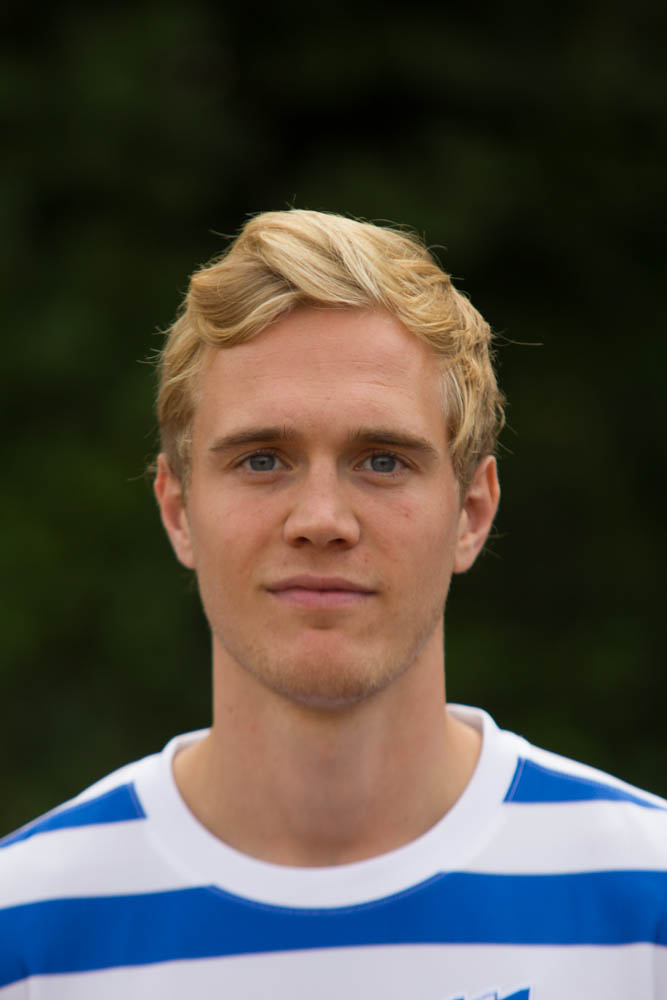
- Jens Wissing in 2013

Personal information
- Date of birth: 2 January 1988 (age 38)
- Place of birth: Gronau, North Rhine-Westphalia, West Germany
- Height: 1.85 m (6 ft 1 in)
- Position: Leftback

Team information
- Current team: Al-Ittihad (manager)

Youth career
- 1993–2001: SC Gronau
- 2001–2004: Schalke 04
- 2004–2007: Preußen Münster

Senior career*
Years	Team	Apps	(Gls)
2007–2010	Preußen Münster	85	(2)
2010–2011	Borussia M'gladbach II	9	(0)
2010–2011	Borussia M'gladbach	3	(0)
2011–2013	SC Paderborn 07	11	(0)
2013–2014	MSV Duisburg	0	(0)
Total		108	(2)

Managerial career
- 2014–2019: Gievenbeck
- 2026: Gamba Osaka
- 2026–: Al-Ittihad
- * Club domestic league appearances and goals

Jens Wissing (born 2 January 1988) is a German football manager and former footballer. He is the current manager of Saudi Pro League club Al-Ittihad.

== Playing career ==
Wissing first played for the youth wings of SG Gronau, FC Schalke 04, and SC Preußen Münster between 2001 and 2007.

Wissing became part of the adult team after being recruited by Roger Schmidt for the 2007–08 Westfalenliga season. The German Sports Association (DSB) awarded Wissing the title of "Athlete of the Year" in 2009. Between 2010 and 2014, he played for Borussia Mönchengladbach II, SC Paderborn 07, and MSV Duisburg, quitting in January 2014 due to a sports injury without participating in any matches for Duisburg.

== Managerial career ==
After his retirement as a player, Wissing served as the manager for 1. FC Gievenbeck for five years from 2014 until 2019. In July 2019, he joined Borussia Mönchengladbach II becoming the assistant manager under Heiko Vogel and later, Arie van Lent. He then moved to PSV in July 2021 joining Roger Schmidt as his assistant manager. Wissing then moved to Benfica a year later reuniting with Roger Schmidt as his assistant manager once again. In June 2025, he moved to Red Bull Sallzburg to become assistant manager to Thomas Letsch.

=== Gamba Osaka ===
On 12 December 2025, Wissing got his first coaching role in a top flight league when he became the manager for J1 League club Gamba Osaka. On 16 May 2026, he led the club to the AFC Champions League Two title following a 1–0 victory over Al-Nassr in the final.

=== Al-Ittihad ===
On 10 July 2026, Wissing became the head coach of Saudi Pro League side Al-Ittihad on a 3-year deal.

== Career statistics ==
Appearances and goals by club, season and competition
Club	Season	League			DFB-Pokal		Other		Total	
Club	Season	Division	Apps	Goals	Apps	Goals	Apps	Goals	Apps	Goals
SC Preußen Münster	2006–07	Oberliga Westfalen	1	0	—		—		1	0
SC Preußen Münster	2007–08	Oberliga Westfalen	34	0	—		5 (Note: Appearances in Westphalian Cup)	1	39	1
SC Preußen Münster	2008–09	Regionalliga West	30	1	1	0	4	0	35	1
SC Preußen Münster	2009–10	Regionalliga West	20	1	1	0	3	0	24	1
SC Preußen Münster	Total		85	2	2	0	12	1	99	3
Borussia M'gladbach II	2010–11	Regionalliga West	9	0	—		—		9	0
Borussia M'gladbach	2010–11	Bundesliga	3	0	1	0	—		4	0
Paderborn 07	2011–12	Bundesliga	3	0	1	0	—		4	0
Paderborn 07	2012–13	2. Bundesliga	8	0	0	0	0	0	8	0
Paderborn 07	Total		11	0	1	0	0	0	12	0
Career total			108	2	4	0	12	1	124	3

== Managerial statistics ==
As of match played 15 August 2026

Managerial record by team and tenure
Team	Nat.	From	To	Record								Ref.
Team	Nat.	From	To	G	W	D	L	GF	GA	GD	Win %	Ref.
Gamba Osaka	(Japan)	1 January 2026	9 July 2026	27	10	11	6	41	30	+11	37.04	
Al-Ittihad	(Saudi Arabia)	10 July 2026	present	5	4	1	0	12	4	+8	80.00	
Career Total				32	14	12	6	46	32	+14	43.75	

== Honours ==
=== Manager ===
Gamba Osaka

- AFC Champions League Two: 2025–26
