= Michael Heinloth =

German footballer

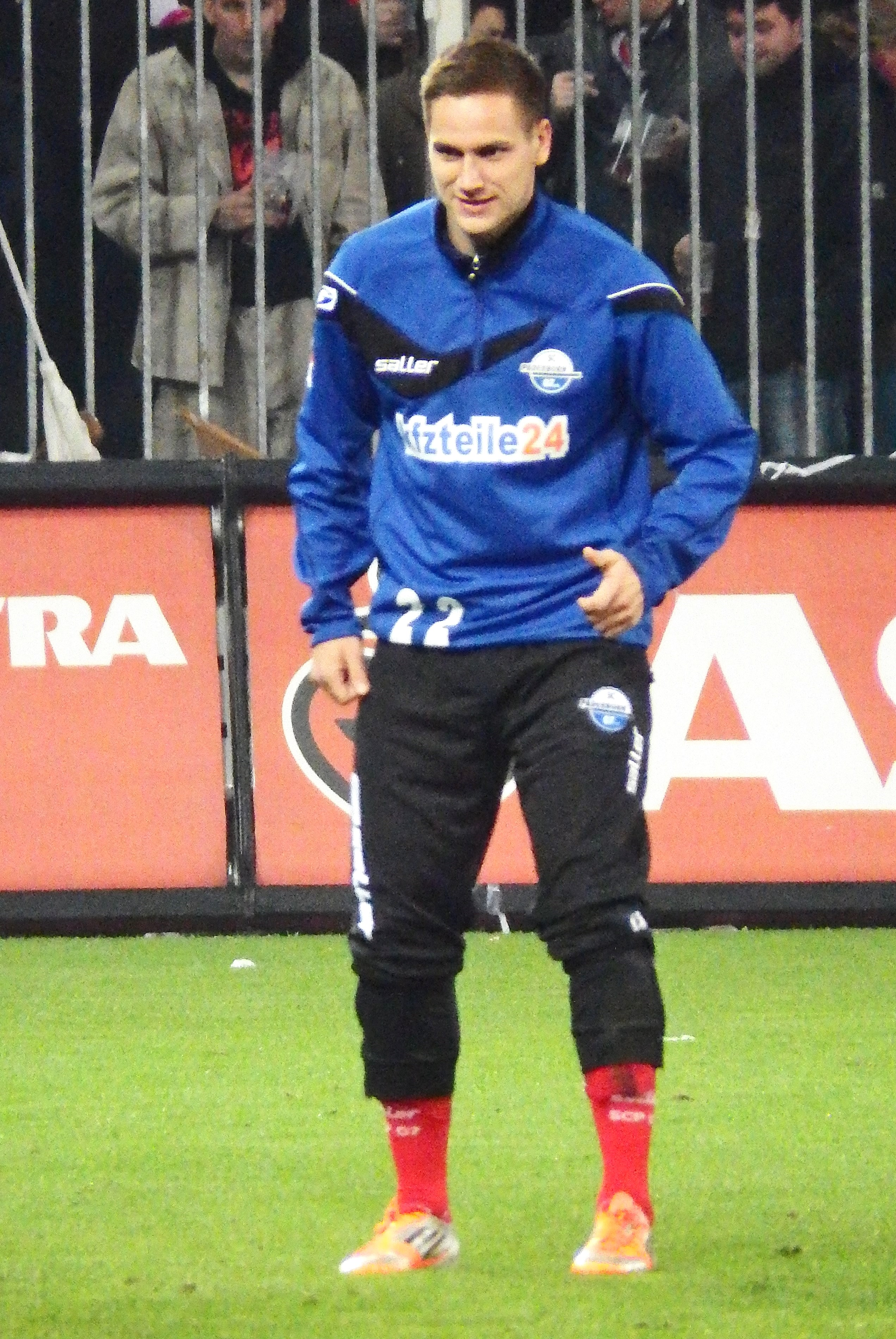
- Heinloth with SC Paderborn in 2013

Personal information
- Date of birth: 9 February 1992 (age 34)
- Place of birth: Roth, Germany
- Height: 1.75 m (5 ft 9 in)
- Position: Right-back

Youth career
- 1996–2003: DJK Allersberg
- 2003–2011: 1. FC Nürnberg

Senior career*
Years	Team	Apps	(Gls)
2010–2014	1. FC Nürnberg II	69	(1)
2014–2016	SC Paderborn	64	(0)
2016–2018	NEC	48	(4)
2018–2019	Zagłębie Sosnowiec	29	(0)
2019–2022	FC Ingolstadt 04	80	(0)
- * Club domestic league appearances and goals as of 15 May 2022

Michael Heinloth (born 9 February 1992) is a German professional footballer who plays as a right-back.

== Club career ==
Heinloth joined SC Paderborn 07 in 2014 from 1. FC Nürnberg. He made his Bundesliga debut at 20 September 2014 against Hannover 96 in a 2–0 home win. He played the first 71 minutes, before being substituted by Stefan Kutschke.

On 18 July 2016, he signed a two-year contract at NEC Nijmegen.

On 20 July 2018, he signed a year contract at Zagłębie Sosnowiec. He made his debut in an Ekstraklasa match against Zagłębie Lubin on 3 October 2018.
