= Daniel Lück =

German footballer

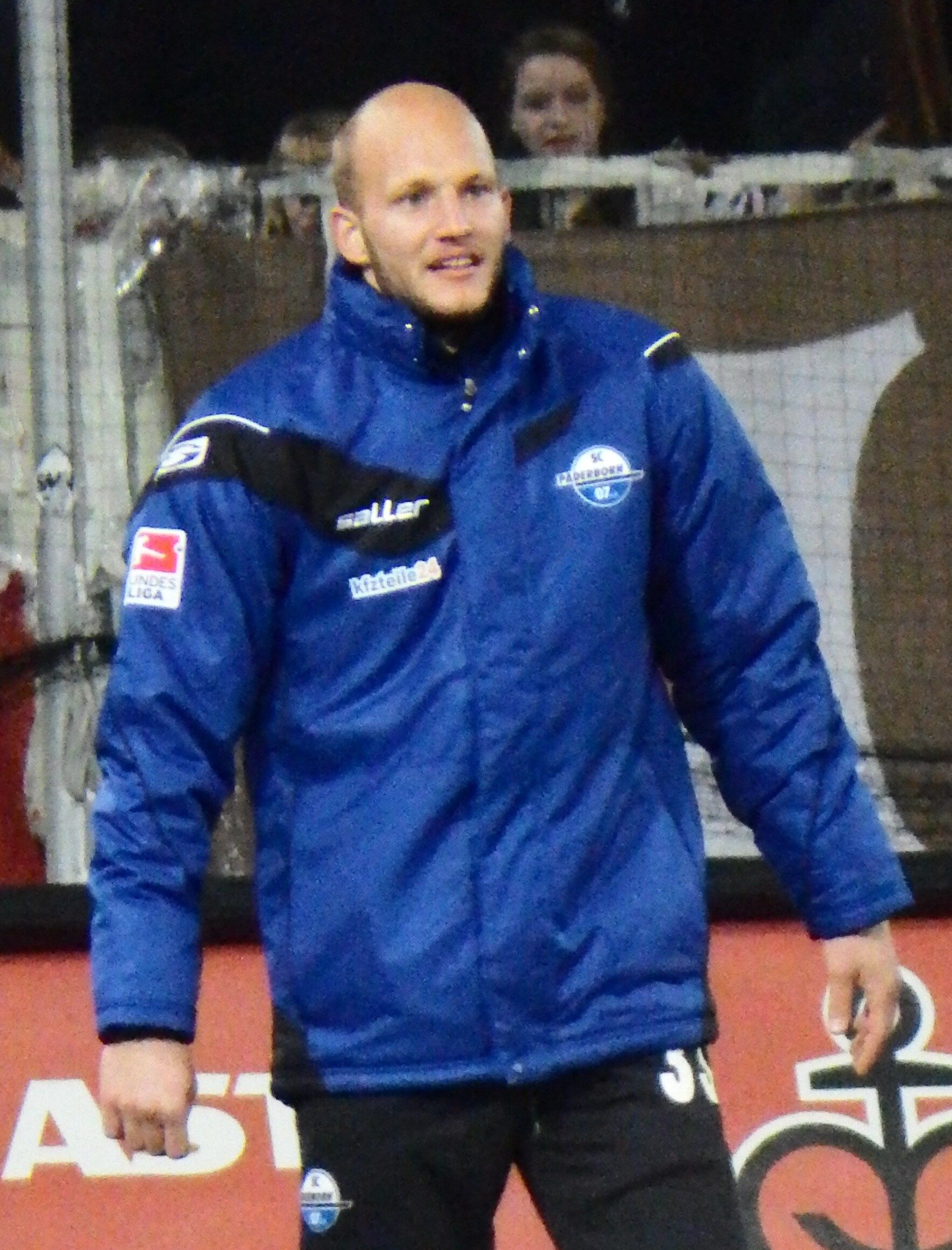
- Lück with SC Paderborn

Personal information
- Date of birth: 18 May 1991 (age 35)
- Place of birth: Oberkochen, Germany
- Height: 1.89 m (6 ft 2 in)
- Position: Goalkeeper

Senior career*
Years	Team	Apps	(Gls)
2010–2012	1899 Hoffenheim II	16	(0)
2012–2015	SC Paderborn	11	(0)
2015–2016	Energie Cottbus	22	(0)
2016–2017	Sturm Graz	2	(0)
Total		51	(0)
- * Club domestic league appearances and goals

Daniel Lück (born 18 May 1991) is a German former professional footballer who played as a goalkeeper.

== Career statistics ==
Appearances and goals by club, season and competition
Club	Season	League			DFB-Pokal		Total	
Club	Season	Division	Apps	Goals	Apps	Goals	Apps	Goals
1899 Hoffenheim II	2010–11	Regionalliga Süd	7	0	—		7	0
1899 Hoffenheim II	2011–12	Regionalliga Süd	9	0	—		6	0
1899 Hoffenheim II	Total		16	0	—		16	0
SC Paderborn	2012–13	2. Bundesliga	5	0	0	0	5	0
SC Paderborn	2013–14	2. Bundesliga	6	0	0	0	6	0
SC Paderborn	2014–15	Bundesliga	0	0	0	0	0	0
SC Paderborn	Total		11	0	0	0	0	0
Energie Cottbus	2015–16	3. Liga	22	0	1	0	23	0
Sturm Graz	2016–17	Austrian Bundesliga	2	0	2	0	4	0
Career total			51	0	3	0	54	0
