= Tim Welker =

German footballer

Personal information
- Full name: Tim Welker
- Date of birth: 8 September 1993 (age 33)
- Place of birth: Zierenberg, Germany
- Height: 1.88 m (6 ft 2 in)
- Position: Centre back

Youth career
- Hessen Kassel
- KSV Baunatal
- SC Paderborn 07

Senior career*
Years	Team	Apps	(Gls)
2012–2015	SC Paderborn 07	2	(0)
2014–2015	SC Paderborn 07 II	20	(0)
2015–2017	Hessen Kassel	13	(0)
2017–2019	TSV Steinbach	20	(0)
2017–2019	TSV Steinbach II	2	(0)
- * Club domestic league appearances and goals as of 01:03, 27 August 2019 (UTC)

Tim Welker is a German footballer who plays as a centre back, most recently for TSV Steinbach.
