= Sven Krause =

German footballer

Personal information
- Date of birth: 19 January 1986 (age 40)
- Place of birth: Paderborn, West Germany
- Height: 1.83 m (6 ft 0 in)
- Position: Striker

Team information
- Current team: SV Lippstadt 08
- Number: 10

Youth career
- –1998: TuRa Elsen
- 1998–2004: Paderborn 07

Senior career*
Years	Team	Apps	(Gls)
2004–2012	Paderborn 07	28	(8)
2007–2008	→ Preußen Münster (loan)	11	(4)
2011	→ 1. FC Saarbrücken (loan)	6	(1)
2012–2013	Wiedenbrück 2000	16	(6)
2013–2015	Lippstadt 08	49	(11)
2015–2016	SV Heide Paderborn	10	(2)
- * Club domestic league appearances and goals

Sven Krause (born 19 January 1986) is a retired German footballer.
