= Sebastian Lange =

German footballer

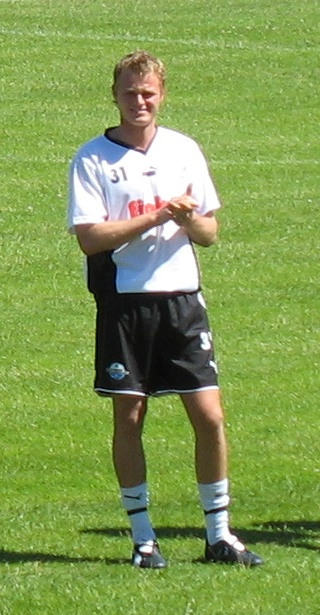
- Sebastian Lange SCP.

Personal information
- Date of birth: 16 October 1987 (age 39)
- Place of birth: Paderborn, West Germany
- Height: 1.86 m (6 ft 1 in)
- Position: Goalkeeper

Team information
- Current team: SC Verl (sporting director)

Youth career
- DJK Mastbruch
- –2006: SC Paderborn 07

Senior career*
Years	Team	Apps	(Gls)
2006–2013	SC Paderborn 07	3	(0)
2010–2012	→ Wiedenbrück (loan)	39	(0)
2013–2022	SC Verl	93	(0)

Managerial career
- 2017–2021: SC Verl (goalkeeper coach)
- 2022–: SC Verl (sporting director)
- * Club domestic league appearances and goals

Sebastian Lange (born 16 October 1987) is a German former footballer.
