= Daniel Brückner =

German footballer (born 1981)

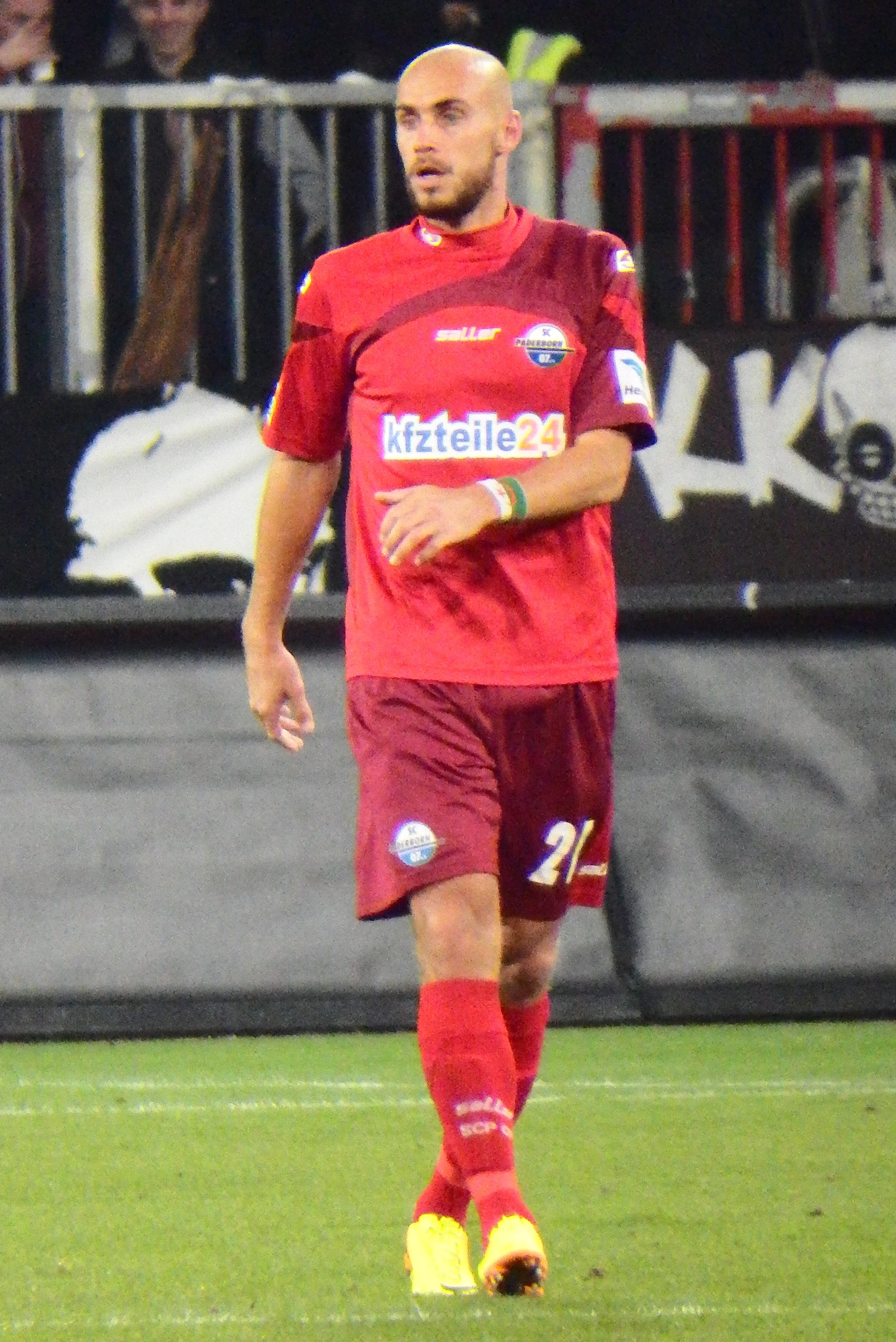
- Brückner playing for Paderborn in 2013

Personal information
- Date of birth: 14 February 1981 (age 45)
- Place of birth: Rostock, East Germany
- Height: 1.83 m (6 ft 0 in)
- Position: Midfielder

Team information
- Current team: Niendorfer TSV
- Number: 21

Youth career
- SV West Eimsbüttel
- Vorwärts/Wacker Billsted

Senior career*
Years	Team	Apps	(Gls)
2001–2004	HEBC Hamburg		
2004–2006	Werder Bremen II	45	(3)
2006–2008	Rot-Weiß Erfurt	68	(13)
2008	Greuther Fürth	7	(0)
2009–2016	SC Paderborn	197	(14)
2016–2018	Rot-Weiß Erfurt	71	(3)
2018–	Niendorfer TSV	49	(6)
- * Club domestic league appearances and goals as of 11:46, 28 September 2020 (UTC)

Daniel Brückner (born 14 February 1981) is a German footballer who plays as a midfielder for Niendorfer TSV.

== International career ==
Although born in Germany, Brückner's father is Algerian and the player has indicated that he has received Algerian citizenship and is interested in representing the country in international competition.
