= Manuel Zeitz =

German footballer (born 1990)

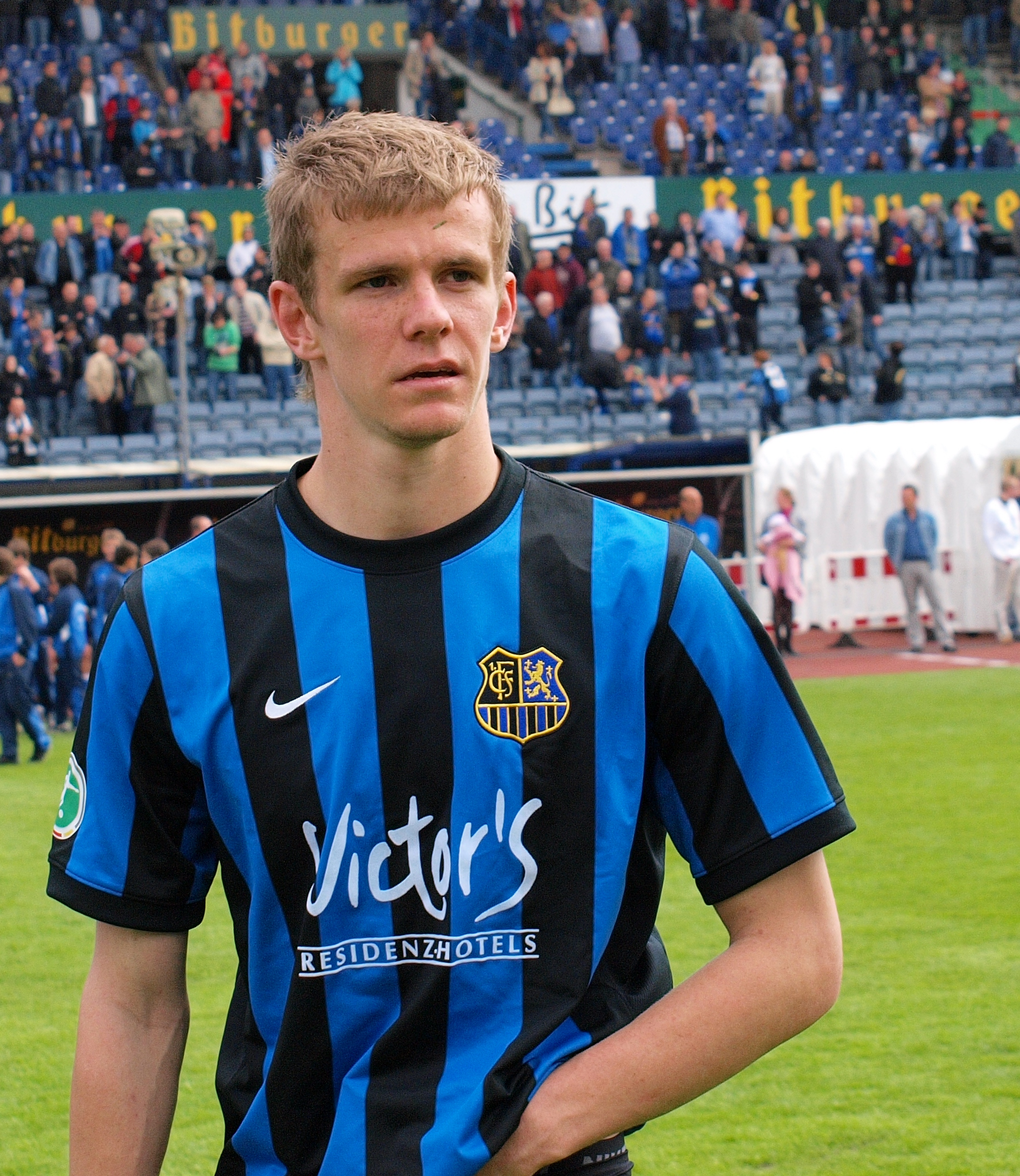
- Zeitz in 2011 in his first spell with 1. FC Saarbrücken

Personal information
- Date of birth: 1 August 1990 (age 36)
- Place of birth: Völklingen, Federal Republic of Germany
- Height: 1.80 m (5 ft 11 in)
- Position: Midfielder

Team information
- Current team: FC Rastpfuhl
- Number: 8

Youth career
- 1994–2004: SC Großrosseln
- 2004–2008: 1. FC Saarbrücken

Senior career*
Years	Team	Apps	(Gls)
2008–2011	1. FC Saarbrücken	90	(25)
2011–2012	1. FC Nürnberg II	26	(4)
2011–2012	1. FC Nürnberg	0	(0)
2012–2014	SC Paderborn	33	(2)
2014	→ 1. FC Saarbrücken (loan)	16	(0)
2014–2016	Energie Cottbus	46	(2)
2015	Energie Cottbus II	1	(0)
2016–2026	1. FC Saarbrücken	273	(21)
2026–	FC Rastpfuhl	0	(0)

International career
2010	Germany U20	2	(0)
- * Club domestic league appearances and goals as of 30 May 2026

Manuel Zeitz (born 1 August 1990) is a German professional footballer who plays as a midfielder for sixth-tier Saarlandliga club FC Rastpfuhl.

== Club career ==
Zeitz was born in Völklingen. He joined 1. FC Saarbrücken in 2004, having previously played for SC Großrosseln, and made his debut for the club in the Oberliga Südwest during the 2008–09 season. Saarbrücken won the league this year, and promotion to the Regionalliga West, and Zeitz established himself as a key player, scoring 11 goals in 32 matches as the club won the title, and a second consecutive promotion. He has been an ever-present in Saarbrücken's first half-season in the 3. Liga, and was named as the best defensive midfielder in the league for this period by the magazine Kicker. He signed for 1. FC Nürnberg at the start of the 2011–12 season. After one season playing solely for the reserves, he first signed for SC Paderborn 07 on loan for one year, before signing a regular two-year contract until June 2015. In January 2014 he returned to Saarbrücken on loan for the remainder of the season, but was unable to prevent them being relegated from the 3. Liga. He then signed a two-year contract until June 2016 for Energie Cottbus, also in the 3. Liga.

== International career ==
Zeitz has been capped twice for Germany's under-20 team, making his debut on 6 September 2010 against Switzerland.

== Honours ==
- Oberliga Südwest (V): 2009
- Regionalliga West (IV): 2010
