= 2012–13 SSV Jahn Regensburg season =

Jahn Regensburg
2012–13 season
- Chairman: Ulrich Weber
- Manager: Franciszek Smuda
- Stadium: Jahnstadion, Regensburg, Bavaria
- 2. Bundesliga: 18th
- DFB-Pokal: 1st Round
- Top goalscorer: League: Francky Sembolo (8); All: Francky Sembolo (8)
- Highest home attendance: 12,500 (sell-out)
- Lowest home attendance: 5,100

The 2012–13 SSV Jahn Regensburg season was the 106th season in the club's football history. In 2012–13 the club played in the 2. Bundesliga, the second tier of German football. It was the club's first season back in this league, having won promotion from the 3. Liga in 2011–12 after a play-off victory over Karlsruher SC.

The club also took part in the 2012–13 edition of the DFB-Pokal, the German Cup, but was knocked out by Bundesliga side FC Bayern Munich in the first round.

== Review and events ==
After a string of losses, manager Oscar Corrochano was suspended on 4 November 2012 and sporting director Franz Gerber took over until the end of 2012. On 2 January 2013, Franciszek Smuda was announced as new manager. His contract ran until the end of the 2012–13 and would have been automatically extended for another season if Regensburg avoided relegation. But Regensburg's relegation was clear on matchday 31 and Smuda said that he would not coach in the 3. Liga.

== Matches ==
=== Legend ===
Win Draw Loss Void Postponed

=== Friendly matches ===
| 27 June 2012 | Auswahl Regen | 0–7 | Jahn Regensburg |
| 18:30 CEST | | Report (in German) | Kurz 17'; Hein 19'; Schmid 25'; M. Müller 54'; Kialka 70'; J. Müller 73', 82' |

| 6 July 2012 | Jahn Regensburg | 1–1 | SV Wehen Wiesbaden | Lengfeld (Bad Abbach) |
| 18:00 CEST | Laurito 3' | Report (in German) | Mintzel 9' |

| 7 July 2012 | FC Aiterhofen-Geltolfing | 0–8 | Jahn Regensburg | Aiterhofen |
| 17:00 CEST | | Report (in German) | Kialka 4' (pen.), 33', 36'; Schmid 16', 25'; Hein 47'; Ramon 58'; Amachaibou 86' (pen.) |

| 12 July 2012 | Jahn Regensburg | 2–5 | FC Petrolul Ploiesti | Warngau |
| 18:00 CEST | Kialka 63'; S. Hofmann 68' | Report (in German) | Grozav 3', 36', 78'; Younés 33', 52' | Stadium: Sportplatz am Flugplatz 1 |

| 13 July 2012 | TSV Buchbach | 1–0 | Jahn Regensburg | Buchbach |
| 18:30 CEST | Staudigl 63' | Report (in German) | | Stadium: SMR-Arena |

| 17 July 2012 | Jahn Regensburg | 3–1 | Bayern Munich II | Parsberg |
| 18:00 CEST | Dedola 53', 90'; Kialka 75' | Report (in German) | Vastic 76' |

| 20 July 2012 | 1. FC Köln | 2–0 | Jahn Regensburg | Windischgarsten |
| 18:00 CEST | Bröcker 50', 61' | Report (in German) |

| 29 July 2012 | Jahn Regensburg | 3–2 | Lech Poznań | Regensburg |
| 17:00 CEST | Kialka 51', 80' (pen.); Amachaibou 56' | Report (in German) | Lovrencsics 34'; Bereszyński 36' |

| 6 September 2012 | Jahn Regensburg | 0–0 | RB Salzburg | Regensburg |
| 17:00 CEST | | Report (in German) | | Stadium: Jahnstadion; Attendance: 250 |

| 13 October 2012 | SpVgg Hankofen-Hailing | 1–4 | Jahn Regensburg | Hankofen |
| 14:30 CEST | Richter 45' | Report (in German) | Erfen 47'; Neunaber 58'; Kialka 72'; Hofmann 89' |

| 9 January 2013 | Jahn Regensburg | 6–0 | SV Fortuna Regensburg | Burgweinting |
| 18:00 CET | J.-P. Müller; Kamavuaka; Sembolo; Haag; Ramon | Report (in German) |

| 10 January 2013 | Jahn Regensburg | 5–2 | TV Schierling | Burgweinting |
| 19:00 CET | Djuricin; Amachaibou; Smarzoch; Hadziresiz | Report (in German) | Brandl; Gröber | Attendance: 250 |

| 11 January 2013 | FC Dingolfing | 0–5 | Jahn Regensburg | Dingolfing |
| 17:00 CET | | Report (in German) | Sembolo; Kialka; Hofmann (pen.); Amachaibou (pen.) | Stadium: Isarwald-Stadion |

| 15 January 2013 | Jahn Regensburg | 2–2 | Eskişehirspor | Belek |
| | Haag 7'; Ramon 21' | Report (in German) | Dursun 10'; Aydın 86' |

| 17 January 2013 | Jahn Regensburg | 1–1 | Sariyerspor | Belek |
| | Amachaibou 80' | Report (in German) | 2' |

| 19 January 2013 | Jahn Regensburg | 2–1 | FC Ordabasy | Belek |
| | Weidlich 70'; Sembolo 80' | Report (in German) | 22' |

| 20 January 2013 | Jahn Regensburg | 3–3 | FC Metalurh Donetsk | Belek |
| | Djuricin 62' (pen.), 90'; Haag 78' | Report (in German) | Makrides 12'; Nelson 35'; 73' |

| 23 January 2013 | Jahn Regensburg | 1–0 | SV Seligenporten | Burgweinting |
| 18:30 CET | Curiel Artiaga | Report (in German) |

| 27 January 2013 | 1. FC Nürnberg | 0–5 | Jahn Regensburg | Nuremberg |
| 18:30 CET | | Report (in German) | Carlinhos 6'; Ramon 13'; Djuricin 75'; Amachaibou 80', 85' | Stadium: Valznerweiher |

| 6 February 2013 | SpVgg Grün-Weiss Deggendorf | 0–7 | Jahn Regensburg | Deggendorf |
| 18:00 CET | | Report (in German) | Ramon 10', 31'; Carlinhos 24' de Guzman 36'; Nachreiner 55'; Müller 67', 72' |

| 20 February 2013 | SV Heimstetten | 2–2 | Jahn Regensburg | Heimstetten |
| 18:15 CET | 30'; 42' (pen.) | Report (in German) | Ramon 23'; Koke 86' | Stadium: Sportpark Heimstetten |

=== 2. Bundesliga ===
| 4 August 2012 1 | 1860 München | 1–0 | Jahn Regensburg | Munich |
| 13:00 CEST | Wojtkowiak 8' | Report (in German) | | Stadium: Allianz Arena; Attendance: 45,300; Referee: Bastian Dankert (Rostock) |

| 11 August 2012 2 | Jahn Regensburg | 2–0 | MSV Duisburg | Regensburg |
| 13:30 CEST | Rahn 36' (pen.); Sembolo 60' | Report (in German) | | Stadium: Jahnstadion; Attendance: 7,818; Referee: Marco Fritz (Korb) |

| 24 August 2012 3 | Hertha BSC | 2–1 | Jahn Regensburg | Berlin |
| 18:00 CEST | Allagui 41'; Wagner 43' | Report (in German) | Sembolo 57' | Stadium: Olympic Stadium; Attendance: 28,000; Referee: Harm Osmers (Hannover) |

| 2 September 2012 4 | Jahn Regensburg | 0–1 | VfL Bochum | Regensburg |
| 13:30 CEST | | Report (in German) | Scheidhauer 79' | Stadium: Jahnstadion; Attendance: 5,912; Referee: Marcel Unger (Halle) |

| 15 September 2012 5 | Eintracht Braunschweig | 1–0 | Jahn Regensburg | Braunschweig |
| 13:00 CEST | Kruppke 67' | Report (in German) | | Stadium: Eintracht-Stadion; Attendance: 19,670; Referee: Christian Fischer (Hemer) |

| 22 September 2012 6 | Jahn Regensburg | 0–1 | Energie Cottbus | Regensburg |
| 13:00 CEST | | Report (in German) | Sørensen 4' | Stadium: Jahnstadion; Attendance: 5,500; Referee: Sascha Stegemann (Niederkassel) |

| 25 September 2012 7 | SV Sandhausen | 1–2 | Jahn Regensburg | Sandhausen |
| 17:30 CEST | Pischorn 37' | Report (in German) | J.-P. Müller 45+1'; Wießmeier 90' | Stadium: Hardtwaldstadion; Attendance: 2,400; Referee: Robert Kampka (Mainz) |

| 28 September 2012 8 | Jahn Regensburg | 3–0 | FC St. Pauli | Regensburg |
| 18:00 CEST | Sembolo 24', 55'; J.-P. Müller 44' | Report (in German) | | Stadium: Jahnstadion; Attendance: 10,500; Referee: Frank Willenborg (Osnabrück) |

| 7 October 2012 9 | Erzgebirge Aue | 3–1 | Jahn Regensburg | Aue |
| 13:30 CEST | Hochscheidt 34'; Sylvestr 58'; König 89' | Report (in German) | Rahn 86' (pen.) | Stadium: Sparkassen-Erzgebirgsstadion; Attendance: 7,400; Referee: Tobias Christ (Münchweiler) |

| 20 October 2012 10 | Jahn Regensburg | 2–3 | 1. FC Köln | Regensburg |
| 13:00 CEST | Müller 5'; Rahn 67' (pen.) | Report (in German) | Ujah 87'; Maroh 90'; Bigalke 90' | Stadium: Jahnstadion; Attendance: 11,465; Referee: Robert Kempter (Sauldorf) |

| 28 October 2012 11 | FSV Frankfurt | 3–1 | Jahn Regensburg | Frankfurt |
| 13:30 CET | Leckie 13'; Görlitz 84'; Bambara 90+1' | Report (in German) | Sembolo 84' | Stadium: Frankfurter Volksbank Stadion; Attendance: 3,301; Referee: Christian Fischer (Hemer) |

| 2 November 2012 12 | Jahn Regensburg | 0–2 | SC Paderborn | Regensburg |
| 18:00 CET | | Report (in German) | Hofmann 13'; Zeitz 87' | Stadium: Jahnstadion; Attendance: 5,410; Referee: Norbert Grudzinski (Hamburg) |

| 11 November 2012 13 | FC Ingolstadt | 4–2 | Jahn Regensburg | Ingolstadt |
| 13:30 CET | Leitl 48' (pen.); Schäffler 70'; Eigler 85' (pen.); Caiuby 90' | Report (in German) | Machado 17'; Amachaibou 80' | Stadium: Audi Sportpark; Attendance: 9,473; Referee: Marcel Unger (Halle) |

| 18 November 2012 14 | Jahn Regensburg | 3–3 | Union Berlin | Regensburg |
| 13:30 CET | Ramon 27'; Sembolo 28'; Amachaibou 81' | Report | Terodde 31', 56'; Jopek 75' | Stadium: Jahnstadion; Attendance: 5,553; Referee: Martin Petersen (Stuttgart) |

| 23 November 2012 15 | Jahn Regensburg | 1–3 | Aalen | Regensburg |
| 18:00 CET | Haag 44' | Report | Valentini 76'; Lechleiter 84'; Reichwein 88' | Stadium: Jahnstadion; Attendance: 5,100; Referee: Harm Osmers (Hanover) |

| 27 November 2012 16 | 1. FC Kaiserslautern | 1–1 | Jahn Regensburg | Kaiserslautern |
| 17:30 CET | Bunjaku 45' | Report | Haag 14' | Stadium: Fritz-Walter-Stadion; Attendance: 24,729; Referee: Markus Wingenbach (Diez) |

| 30 November 2012 17 | Jahn Regensburg | 0–0 | Dynamo Dresden | Regensburg |
| 18:00 CET | | Report | | Stadium: Jahnstadion; Attendance: 7,410; Referee: Christian Bandurski (Oberhausen) |

| 9 December 2012 18 | Jahn Regensburg | 1–1 | 1860 München | Regensburg |
| 13:30 CET | S. Hofmann 57' (pen.) | Report | Stoppelkamp 85' | Stadium: Jahnstadion; Attendance: 12,500 (sell-out); Referee: Bibiana Steinhaus (Hanover) |

| 16 December 2012 19 | MSV Duisburg | 4–2 | Jahn Regensburg | Duisburg |
| 13:30 CET | Šukalo 52'; Jovanović 61'; Brandy 63'; Brosinski 88' | Report | Sembolo 11'; Laurito 40' | Stadium: Schauinsland-Reisen-Arena; Attendance: 10,741; Referee: Christian Fischer (Hemer) |

| 3 February 2013 20 | Jahn Regensburg | 1–5 | Hertha BSC | Regensburg |
| 13:30 CET | Denis-Danso Weidlich 78' | Report | Ramos 52'; Ronny 56', 85'; Wagner 68'; Knoll 90' | Stadium: Jahnstadion; Attendance: 10,212; Referee: Guido Winkmann (Kerken) |

| 10 February 2013 21 | VfL Bochum | 0–2 | Jahn Regensburg | Bochum |
| 13:30 CET | | Report | Djuricin 47', 87' | Stadium: rewirpowerSTADION; Attendance: 10,685; Referee: Tobias Christ (Münchweiler) |

| 15 February 2013 22 | Jahn Regensburg | 0–1 | Eintracht Braunschweig | Regensburg |
| 18:00 CET | | Report | Kumbela 15' | Stadium: Jahnstadion; Attendance: 6,289; Referee: Robert Kampka (Mainz) |

| 24 February 2013 23 | Energie Cottbus | 1–1 | Jahn Regensburg | Cottbus |
| 13:30 CET | Schulze 65' | Report | Carlinhos 17' | Stadium: Stadion der Freundschaft; Attendance: 6,492; Referee: Markus Schmidt (Stuttgart) |

| 1 March 2013 24 | Jahn Regensburg | 1–3 | SV Sandhausen | Regensburg |
| 18:00 CET | Olajengbesi 30'; Löning 45+1'; Riemann 90+2' | Report | Carlinhos 42' | Stadium: Jahnstadion; Attendance: 6,123; Referee: Jochen Drees (Münster-Sarmsheim) |

| 8 March 2013 25 | FC St. Pauli | 3–2 | Jahn Regensburg | Hamburg |
| 18:00 CET | Gogia 18'; Ginczek 66'; Bruns 90' | Report | Koke 23'; Kamavuaka 89' | Stadium: Millerntor-Stadion; Attendance: 27,000; Referee: Marcel Unger (Halle) |

| 17 March 2013 26 | Jahn Regensburg | 1–1 | Erzgebirge Aue | Regensburg |
| 13:30 CET | Koke 26' | Report | Schlitte 12' | Stadium: Jahnstadion; Attendance: 6,771; Referee: Frank Willenborg (Osnabrück) |

| 31 March 2013 27 | 1. FC Köln | 2–1 | Jahn Regensburg | Cologne |
| 13:30 CEST | McKenna 28'; Royer 87' | Report | Djuricin 73' | Stadium: RheinEnergieStadion; Attendance: 45,600; Referee: Martin Petersen (Stuttgart) |

| 6 April 2013 28 | Jahn Regensburg | 1–4 | FSV Frankfurt | Regensburg |
| 13:00 CEST | Hein 78' (pen.) | Report | Stark 56'; Yelen 72'; Kapllani 84', 89' (pen.) | Stadium: Jahnstadion; Attendance: 7,000; Referee: Florian Steuer (Menden) |

| 14 April 2013 29 | SC Paderborn | 0–0 | Jahn Regensburg | Paderborn |
| 13:30 CEST | | Report | | Stadium: Energieteam Arena; Attendance: 6,290; Referee: Bibiana Steinhaus (Hanover) |

| 19 April 2013 30 | Jahn Regensburg | 1–2 | FC Ingolstadt | Regensburg |
| 18:00 CEST | Sembolo 22' | Report | Korkmaz 7'; Heller 29' | Stadium: Jahnstadion; Attendance: 5,322; Referee: Norbert Grudzinski (Hamburg) |

| 26 April 2013 31 | Union Berlin | 1–0 | Jahn Regensburg | Berlin |
| 18:00 CEST | Mattuschka 63' (pen.) | Report | | Stadium: Stadion An der Alten Försterei; Attendance: 16,857; Referee: Harm Osmers (Hanover) |

| 3 May 2013 32 | VfR Aalen | 2–1 | Jahn Regensburg | Aalen |
| 18:00 CEST | Lechleiter 26'; Hübner 78' | Report | J.-P. Müller 29' | Stadium: Scholz-Arena; Attendance: 5,632; Referee: Christian Bandurski (Oberhausen) |

| 12 May 2013 33 | Jahn Regensburg | 1–3 | 1. FC Kaiserslautern | Regensburg |
| 13:30 CEST | Ziereis 27' | Report | Hoffer 12'; Idrissou 20'; Orban 84' | Stadium: Jahnstadion; Attendance: 8,105; Referee: Thorsten Kinhöfer (Herne) |

| 19 May 2013 34 | Dynamo Dresden | 3–1 | Jahn Regensburg | Dresden |
| 13:30 CEST | Fořt 50', 54'; Fiél 83' (pen.) | Report | Koke 86' | Stadium: Glücksgas Stadium; Attendance: 29,703; Referee: Markus Schmidt (Stuttgart) |

=== DFB-Pokal ===
| 20 August 2012 1st Round | Jahn Regensburg | 0 – 4 | Bayern Munich | Regensburg |
| 20:30 CEST | | Report (in German) | Mandžukić 32', 80'; Shaqiri 60'; Pizarro 88' | Stadium: Jahnstadion; Attendance: 12,500 (sell-out); Referee: Guido Winkmann (Kerken) |

== Squad ==
=== Squad and statistics ===
==== Squad, matches played and goals scored ====
Squad Season 2012–13
| No. | Player | Nat. | Birthdate | at Jahn since | previous club | League matches | League goals | Cup matches | Cup goals |
Goalkeepers
| 1 | Michael Hofmann | German | 3 November 1972 | 2010 | 1860 München | 12 | 0 | 1 | 0 |
| 26 | Timo Ochs | German | 17 October 1981 | 2013 | 1860 München | 13 | 0 | 0 | 0 |
| 33 | Patrick Wiegers | German | 19 April 1990 | 2010 | SpVgg Grün-Weiss Deggendorf | 9 | 0 | 0 | 0 |
| 40 | Bernhard Hendl | Austria | 17 October 1981 | 2013 | VfB Stuttgart II | 0 | 0 | 0 | 0 |
Defenders
| 3 | Christian Rahn | German | 15 June 1979 | 2012 | Greuther Fürth | 21 | 3 | 1 | 0 |
| 6 | André Laurito | German | 24 November 1983 | 2010 | Eintracht Bamberg | 23 | 1 | 1 | 0 |
| 8 | Jonatan Kotzke | German | 8 July 1986 | 2012 | 1860 München | 18 | 0 | 1 | 0 |
| 22 | Mario Neunaber | German | 17 March 1982 | 2011 | Hessen Kassel | 13 | 0 | 1 | 0 |
| 28 | Sebastian Nachreiner | German | 23 November 1988 | 2010 | FC Dingolfing | 30 | 0 | 1 | 0 |
| 32 | Carlinhos | Brazil | 22 June 1994 | 2013 | Bayer 04 Leverkusen | 13 | 2 | 0 | 0 |
| 38 | Philipp Ziereis | German | 14 March 1993 | 2007 | SV Schwarzhofen | 11 | 1 | 1 | 0 |
Midfielders
| 7 | Abdenour Amachaibou | German | 2 January 1987 | 2012 | SpVgg Unterhaching | 19 | 2 | 1 | 0 |
| 10 | Romain Dedola | France | 2 January 1989 | 2012 | FC Ingolstadt | 0 | 0 | 0 | 0 |
| 11 | Patrick Haag | German | 9 March 1990 | 2012 | Karlsruher SC | 22 | 2 | 1 | 0 |
| 13 | Jim-Patrick Müller | German | 4 August 1989 | 2011 | Greuther Fürth | 16 | 4 | 1 | 0 |
| 17 | Oliver Hein | German | 20 March 1990 | 2007 | FC Dingolfing | 28 | 1 | 1 | 0 |
| 18 | Marius Müller | German | 5 October 1990 | 2012 | FSV Frankfurt | 0 | 0 | 0 | 0 |
| 19 | Koray Altinay | German | 11 October 1991 | 2012 | Bayern Munich | 14 | 0 | 0 | 0 |
| 20 | Denis-Danso Weidlich | German | 8 July 1986 | 2012 | Rot-Weiß Erfurt | 22 | 1 | 0 | 0 |
| 24 | Tim Erfen | German | 22 October 1982 | 2012 | SSV Jahn Regensburg | 11 | 0 | 0 | 0 |
| 30 | Julian de Guzman | Canada | 25 March 1981 | 2013 | FC Dallas | 15 | 0 | 0 | 0 |
| 34 | Wilson Kamavuaka | Congolese | 29 March 1990 | 2012 | 1. FC Nürnberg | 28 | 1 | 0 | 0 |
| 37 | Julian Wießmeier | German | 4 November 1992 | 2012 | 1. FC Nürnberg | 19 | 1 | 0 | 0 |
Forwards
| 4 | Ramon | Brazil | 4 April 1991 | 2012 | Junior Team | 24 | 2 | 0 | 0 |
| 9 | Sebastian Hofmann | German | 12 September 1983 | 2011 | FC Ingolstadt | 9 | 0 | 0 | 0 |
| 10 | Koke | Spain | 27 April 1983 | 2013 | FC Baku | 8 | 3 | 0 | 0 |
| 12 | Francky Sembolo | Congo | 9 August 1985 | 2012 | SV Wilhelmshaven | 32 | 8 | 1 | 0 |
| 14 | Thiemo-Jérôme Kialka | German | 12 January 1989 | 2012 | 1. FC Köln | 7 | 0 | 0 | 0 |
| 21 | Thomas Kurz | German | 3 April 1988 | 2011 | Bayern Munich | 2 | 0 | 0 | 0 |
| 25 | Markus Smarzoch | German | 14 April 1990 | 2011 | Freier TuS Regensburg | 11 | 0 | 1 | 0 |
| 31 | Benedikt Schmid | German | 19 November 1990 | 2010 | 1. FC Bad Kötzting | 0 | 0 | 0 | 0 |
| 35 | Pedro Beck-Gomez | Brazil | 13 August 1992 | 2012 | Junior Team | 2 | 0 | 0 | 0 |
| 39 | Marco Djuricin | Austria | 12 December 1992 | 2012 | Hertha BSC | 16 | 3 | 1 | 0 |
Last updated: 19 May 2013

=== Transfers ===
==== In ====
| No. | Pos. | Nat. | Name | Age | EU | Moving from | Type | Transfer window | Ends | Transfer fee | Source |
|---|---|---|---|---|---|---|---|---|---|---|---|
| 7 | MF | (Germany) | Abdenour Amachaibou | 25 | EU | SpVgg Unterhaching | End of contract | Summer | 2014 | N/A | |
| 11 | MF | (Germany) | Patrick Haag | 22 | EU | Karlsruher SC | End of contract | Summer | 2014 | N/A | |
| 20 | MF | (Germany) | Denis-Danso Weidlich | 25 | EU | Rot-Weiß Erfurt | End of contract | Summer | 2014 | N/A | |
| 8 | DF | (Germany) | Jonatan Kotzke | 25 | EU | 1860 Munich | End of contract | Summer | 2014 | N/A | |
| 19 | MF | (Germany) | Koray Altinay | 20 | EU | Bayern Munich | End of contract | Summer | 2014 | N/A | |
| 18 | MF | (Germany) | Marius Müller | 21 | EU | FSV Frankfurt | End of contract | Summer | 2014 | N/A | |
| 12 | FW | (Republic of the Congo) | Francky Sembolo | 26 | | SV Wilhelmshaven | End of contract | Summer | 2013 | Free | |
| 3 | DF | (Germany) | Christian Rahn | 33 | EU | SpVgg Greuther Fürth | End of contract | Summer | 2013 | Free | |
| 39 | FW | (Austria) | Marco Djuricin | 19 | EU | Hertha BSC | Loan | Summer | 2013 | | |
| 37 | MF | (Germany) | Julian Wießmeier | 19 | EU | 1. FC Nürnberg | Loan | Summer | 2013 | | |
| 34 | MF | (Germany) | Wilson Kamavuaka | 22 | EU | 1. FC Nürnberg | Loan | Summer | 2013 | | |
| 32 | DF | (Brazil) | Carlinhos | 18 | | Bayer Leverkusen | Loan | Winter | 2013 | | |
| 26 | GK | (Germany) | Timo Ochs | 30 | EU | 1860 Munich | Transfer | Winter | 2013 | N/A | |
| 30 | MF | (Canada) | Julian de Guzman | 31 | EU | FC Dallas (United States) | End of contract | Winter | 2013 | Free | |
| 10 | FW | (Spain) | Koke | 29 | EU | Baku (Azerbaijan) | End of contract | Winter | 2013 | Free | |
| 40 | GK | (Austria) | Bernhard Hendl | 19 | EU | VfB Stuttgart | Transfer | Winter | 2013 | N/A | |

==== Out ====
| No. | Pos. | Nat. | Name | Age | EU | Moving to | Type | Transfer window | Transfer fee | Source |
|---|---|---|---|---|---|---|---|---|---|---|
| 12 | MF | (Turkey) | Selçuk Alibaz | 22 | | Karlsruher SC | End of contract | Summer | Free | |
| 11 | FW | (Germany) | Michael Klauß | 25 | EU | VfR Aalen | End of contract | Summer | Free | |
| 3 | DF | (Germany) | Ronny Philp | 23 | EU | FC Augsburg | End of contract | Summer | Free | |
| 7 | FW | (Germany) | Tobias Schweinsteiger | 30 | EU | Bayern Munich II | End of contract | Summer | Free | |
| 2 | DF | (Germany) | Stefan Binder | 33 | EU | | End of career | Summer | N/A | |
| 29 | MF | (Germany) | Christian Bickel | 21 | EU | SC Freiburg | End of loan | Summer | N/A | |
| 8 | MF | (Germany) | Tobias Schlauderer | 28 | EU | | End of career | Summer | N/A | |
| 36 | FW | (Germany) | Jürgen Schmid | 30 | EU | | End of career | Summer | N/A | |
| 40 | GK | (Germany) | Björn Bussmann | 21 | EU | VfL Osnabrück | End of contract | Summer | Free | |
| 5 | DF | (Socialist Federal Republic of Yugoslavia) | Mersad Selimbegović | 30 | | | End of contract | Summer | N/A | |
| 23 | MF | (Germany) | Martin Zurawsky | 21 | EU | | End of contract | Summer | N/A | |
| 4 | MF | (Germany) | Yusuf Kasal | 24 | EU | | End of contract | Summer | N/A | |
| 10 | MF | (Germany) | Mahmut Temür | 22 | EU | Rot-Weiß Erfurt | End of contract | Summer | N/A | |
| 35 | FW | (Romania) | Ruben Popa | 23 | EU | | End of contract | Summer | N/A | |
| 10 | MF | (France) | Romain Dedola | 23 | EU | | End of contract | Winter | Free | |
| 14 | FW | (Germany) | Thiemo-Jérôme Kialka | 23 | EU | Fortuna Köln (Germany) | End of contract | Winter | Free | |
| 18 | MF | (Germany) | Marius Müller | 21 | EU | | Loan | Winter | N/A | |
