= Fath =

Fath may refer to:

== People ==
Given name

- Abol Fath Khan (1755/56 – 1787), third Shah of the Zand dynasty, ruler of the Persian Empire in 1779
- Abu'l-Fath, 14th-century Samaritan chronicler
- Abu'l-Fath an-Nasir ad-Dailami (died 1053), imam of the Zaidi state in Yemen
- Abu'l-Fath Musa (died 1034), Shaddadid ruler in Armenia
- Abu'l-Fath Yusuf, 12th-century Persian vizier to Arslan-Shah of Ghazna
- al-Fath ibn Khaqan (ca. 817/818 – 861), Abbasid writer and official, friend and chief adviser of Caliph al-Mutawakkil
- al-Fath ibn Khaqan (al-Andalus) (died 1134), Andalusian writer
- Fatḥ al-Din Ibn Sayyid al-Nās (1272–1334), Egyptian theologian
- Fath al-Qal'i, ruler of Aleppo in 1016
- Fath-Ali Khan Afshar (fl. 1747-1748), Afsharid chieftain in northern Iran
- Fath-Ali Khan Daghestani (fl. 1716-20), Lezgian nobleman who served as vizier to the Safavid king (shah) Sultan Husayn
- Fath-Ali Khan Qajar (1686–1726), Persian military commander
- Fath-Ali Shah Qajar (1772–1834), second Qajar Emperor (Shah) of Iran
- Fath Muhammad (1704–1725), General of Mysore, India
- Fath Shah (fl. 1486-1516), ruler of Kashmir
- Mirza Fath-ul-Mulk Bahadur (1816/18 – 1856), last Crown Prince of the Mughal Empire

Surname

- Abu'l-Musafir al-Fath (died 929), the last Sajid amir of Azerbaijan
- Farah Fath (born 1984), American actress
- Georges Fath (1818–1900), French playwright, illustrator and writer
- Jacques Fath (1912–1954), French fashion designer
- Josef Fath (1911–1985), German footballer
- Helmut Fath (1929–1993), German sidecar racer and engineer
- Ibrahim Khan Fath-i-Jang (reigned 1617–1624), Subahdar of Bengal
- Mahmud Abu al-Fath (1885–1958), Egyptian journalist
- Saoud Fath (born 1980), Qatari footballer
- Sébastien Fath (born 1968), French historian
- Sinān ibn al-Fatḥ (c. early 10th century), mathematician from Harran, Upper Mesopotamia
- Steffen Fäth (born 1990), German handball player
- Taj al-Din Shah-i Shahan Abu'l Fath (c. 1349 – 1403), Mihrabanid malik of Sistan

== Places ==
- Fath, Iran, a village in Kohgiluyeh and Boyer-Ahmad Province
- Fath Air Base, Iran
- Fath Bagh, a village in Anjirabad Rural District, in the Central District of Gorgan County, Golestan Province, Iran
- Fath Expressway, Tehran, Iran
- Fath Oil Field, an area of offshore oil production approximately 60 miles (97 km) from Dubai
- Fath al Bu Sa`id, a village in Muscat, in northeastern Oman
- Fath-e Maqsud, a village in Gerdeh Rural District, in the Central District of Namin County, Ardabil Province, Iran
- Fath ol Jalil, a village in Sarkhun Rural District, Qaleh Qazi District, Bandar Abbas County, Hormozgan Province, Iran
- Fath ol Mobin District, Shush County, Khuzestan Province, Iran

== Organisations ==
- Al-Fatat, 20th-century Arab nationalist organization
- Al-Fatat SC, a Kuwaiti football club
- Fath Riadi de Nador, a Moroccan football club
- Fath Tehran F.C., an Iranian football club
- Fath Union Sport, a Moroccan football club based in Rabat

== Other uses ==
- Fath (cannon), Iranian naval artillery
- Fath (newspaper), a defunct Iranian newspaper
- Al-Fattāḥ, a name of God in Islam
- Al-Fath, a surah (chapter) of the Qur'an
- Al-Fath (magazine) (1926–1948), Islamist political magazine in Egypt
- Al-Fatat (periodical) (1892–1894), Egyptian women's magazine
- Al-Fath Mosque, Cairo, Egypt
- Al-Fatah Mosque, Kigali, Kigali, Rwanda
- Al-Fath Al-Mubin, Syrian opposition military
- Al-Fatah Brigade, armed Islamist insurgent group in Syria
- Ababil-100 or Al-Fat'h, Iraqi short-range ballistic missile
- Operation Fath ol-Mobin, a major Iranian military operation during the Iran-Iraq War
- Operation Fath 1, a joint Iranian and Iraqi Kurdish military operation during the Iran-Iraq War
- Order of Fath, a military award of the Iranian armed forces

== See also ==
- Fatah (disambiguation)
- Fattah (disambiguation)
- Fateh (disambiguation)
- Fath al-Bari, a Sunni commentary in Sahih al-Bukhari, written by Ibn Hajr Asqalani
- Fathul Bari Mat Jahya (born 1980), Malaysian Islamic scholar
- Ravayat-e Fath, an Iranian documentary TV series about the Iran-Iraq War
- Takmilat Fath al-Mulhim, a commentary by Muhammad Taqi Usmani completing the commentary of Shabbir Ahmad Usmani on Sahih Muslim
