= Fateh =

Fateh (فاتح, Fātiḥ) is an Arabic-language name that translates to "conqueror". It is used in many other languages across the Muslim world and in societies that have significant Islamic influence.

== As a given name ==
- Fateh (name)
  - Fateh (rapper), Indian-Canadian rapper
  - Fateh Singh (disambiguation)
- Fatih (name)

== Groups and places ==
- Fatah, a Palestinian nationalist political party
- Fateh Oil Field, an oil-producing area situated near Dubai in the United Arab Emirates
- Fateh squad, a Balochistan Liberation Army faction
- Al Fateh Grand Mosque, a mosque in Bahrain
- El Fateh, a city in Egypt
- Al Fateh Sports Club, a Saudi Arabian multi-sports club
- Al-Fateh, an Arabic-language children's magazine with links to Hamas

== Films ==
- Fateh (1991 film), a 1991 Hindi-language Indian film
- Fateh (2014 film), a 2014 Punjabi-language Indian film
- Fateh (2025 film), a 2025 Hindi-language Indian film

== Other ==
- Fateh-110, an Iranian tactical short-range ballistic missile
- Fateh-313, an Iranian tactical short-range ballistic missile
- Fateh-class submarine, an Iranian class of semi-heavy submarines
- "Fateh", a song by Salvage Audio Collective, Charan and Romy from the 2022 Indian film Shabaash Mithu

== See also ==
- Fatah (disambiguation)
- Fatih (disambiguation)
- Fattah (disambiguation)
- Fath (disambiguation)
- Fatteh, an Egyptian and Levantine dish
