= Fatah (disambiguation) =

Fatah is a moderate Palestinian nationalist political party, and the largest faction of the confederated multi-party Palestine Liberation Organization.

Fatah may also refer to:

== People ==
- Fatah (name)

== Political organizations ==
- Fatah al-Intifada, a Palestinian militant faction
- Fatah al-Islam, a Palestinian Islamist militant group
- Fatah Alliance, an Iraqi political coalition
- Fatah Halab, a joint-operations room of rebel factions operating in the Syrian Civil War
- Fatah Hawks, a Palestinian militant-group duo
- Fatah Special Operations Group, a Palestinian militant faction
- Fateh squad, a Balochistan Liberation Army faction

== Places ==
- Fatah Kandi, a village in West Azerbaijan Province, Iran

== Other ==
- al-Fattāḥ, a name of God in Islam

== Weapons ==
- Ababil-100 or Al-Fatah, an Iraqi short-range ballistic missile
- Fatah (multiple rocket launcher), Pakistani guided MLRS family
- Fattah-1, Iranian medium-range ballistic missile
- Fateh-110, Iranian tactical short-range ballistic missile
- Fateh-313, an Iranian tactical short-range ballistic missile

== See also ==
- Fattah (disambiguation)
- Fateh (disambiguation)
- Fath (disambiguation)
