= Kuwaiti Women's Volleyball League =

- Current season, competition or edition: 2025–26 Kuwaiti League
- Sport: Volleyball
- First season: 2021; 5 years ago
- Administrator: KVA
- No. of teams: 6 teams
- Country: Kuwait
- Confederation: AVC
- Continent: Asia
- Most titles: Al-Fatat SC / Salwa Alsabah (2 titles)
- Level on pyramid: Level 1
- Relegation to: National 2
- Domestic cups: Kuwait Cup; Kuwait Super Cup
- International cups: AVC Champions League; Arab Clubs Championship

The Kuwaiti Women's Volleyball League (Arabic : الدوري الكويتي للكرة الطائرة للسيدات ) is the top-level women's volleyball league in Kuwait. It was founded in 2021 and is organized by the Kuwait Volleyball Association. The league was established to provide a national competition for women's volleyball clubs and to support the development of the sport in Kuwait. Since its inaugural season, the league has served as the country's highest domestic competition for women's volleyball. At its launch, the league featured six participating clubs. The competition was cancelled in 2025 due to the participation of Kuwaiti clubs in Arab and West Asian competitions. In 2026, the league was also affected by the Iran war. As a result of the conflict and its impact on the sporting calendar, the league schedule was extended and completed in September 2026. By the 2026 season, participation had declined to three clubs. Despite the reduced number of teams, the league remains the highest level of women's volleyball competition in Kuwait and continues to contribute to the growth and development of women's volleyball in the country.

== Titles by Clubs ==
Titles by club
Rank	Club	Titles	Runners-up	Last title
1	Al-Fatat SC	2	2	2023–24
1	Salwa Alsabah SC	2	1	2022–23
3	Al-Arabi SC	0	1	—
4	Kuwait SC	0	0	—
4	Al Ayoun	0	0	—
4	Regency Kuwait	0	0	—

== Winners list ==
Season	Champions	Runners-up	Third place
2025/26			
2024/25	Cancelled		
2023/24	Al-Fatat SC	Salwa Alsabah SC	Al Ayoun
2022/23	Salwa Alsabah SC	Al-Fatat SC	Kuwait SC
2021/22	Salwa Alsabah SC	Al-Fatat SC	Al-Arabi SC
2020/21	Al-Fatat SC	Al-Arabi SC	Regency Kuwait

Sources :
