= Fatih (disambiguation) =

Fatih is a Turkish word of Arabic language origin meaning "the Conqueror". It may refer to:

== Given name ==
- Fatih (name)

== Places ==
- Başakşehir Fatih Terim Stadium, a football stadium in Başakşehir District, Istanbul, Turkey
- Fatih, a central district of Istanbul Province, Turkey
- Fatih Mosque (disambiguation)
- Fatih Sultan Mehmet Bridge, a motorway bridge over the Bosphorus, Istanbul, Turkey
- Fatih University, a former private university in Istanbul, Turkey

== Other uses ==
- Fatih (drillship), a drillship of Turkey
- Fatih project, a project of the Turkish government for Movement to Increase Opportunities and Technology
- Fatih (TV series), a 2013 Turkish television historical drama series
