= Marius Müller =

Marius Müller is the name of:

- Marius Müller (musician) (1958–1999), Norwegian guitarist, vocalist, songwriter and record producer
- Marius Müller (footballer, born 1990), German football midfielder
- Marius Müller (footballer, born 1993), German football goalkeeper

See also

- Marius Müller-Westernhagen (born 1948), German singer and actor
