= Fatehi =

Fatehi is a surname. Notable people with the surname include:

- Ahmed Fatehi (born 1993), Qatari footballer
- Nazanin Fatehi (born 1987), Iranian woman sentenced to death
- Nora Fatehi (born 1992), Canadian dancer, model, actress, singer, and producer

== See also ==
- Fateh (name)
