= Kasal =

Kasal may refer to:

== People ==
- Bradley Kasal (born 1966), United States Marine
- Michal Kasal (born 1994), Czech handball player
- Yusuf Kasal (born 1988), German-Turkish footballer
- Bohumil Kasal (born 1956), Czech-American Scientist

== Arts and entertainment ==
- Kasal (2014 film), Filipino film directed by Joselito Altarejos
- Kasal (2018 film), Filipino film directed by Ruel S. Bayani
- Kasal, Kasali, Kasalo (or Wedding, Together, Partaker), 2006 Filipino romantic comedy film directed by Jose Javier Reyes
