= Fethiye (disambiguation) =

Fethiye is a city and district of Muğla Province, Turkey. Fethiye may also refer to:

== People ==
- Fethiye Çetin (born 1950), Turkish lawyer

== Places ==
- Gulf of Fethiye, a gulf of the Mediterranean Sea
- Fethiye, Kahramankazan, neighborhood of Kahramankazan, Ankara Province, Turkey, formerly a village
- Fethiye, Yenişehir

== Mosques ==
- Fethiye Mosque (disambiguation)

== Other ==
- Fethiyespor, Turkish football club based in the city
- Fethiye Museum, Istanbul
