= Fatih (name) =

Fatih is a Turkish masculine given name originating from the Arabic word Fateh (Arabic: فَاتِح fātiḥ), meaning "conqueror, victor". In Turkish, it is the title of the Ottoman Sultan Mehmed II. Notable people with the name include:

== Given name ==
- Fatih Ahıskalı (born 1976), Turkish musician
- Fatih Akin (born 1973), German-Turkish film director, screenwriter, and producer
- Fatih Aksoy (born 1997), Turkish footballer
- Fatih Akyel (born 1977), Turkish footballer
- Fatih Al (born 1976), Turkish actor
- Fatih Altaylı (born 1962), Turkish journalist, columnist, and television presenter
- Fatih Artman (born 1988), Turkish actor
- Fatih Atik (born 1984), French-Turkish footballer
- Fatih Avan (born 1989), Turkish javelin thrower
- Fatih Aydın (born 1995), Turkish footballer
- Fatih Bakır (born 1977), Turkish wrestler
- Fatih Baydar (born 1983), Turkish weightlifter
- Fatih Birol (born 1958), Turkish economist
- Fatih Bozkurt (born 2000), Turkish Greco-Roman wrestler
- Fatih Çakıroğlu (born 1981), Turkish wrestler
- Fatih Candan (born 1989), Turkish-German footballer
- Fatih Çelik (born 1992), Turkish Paralympic Taekwondo practitioner
- Fatih Cengiz (born 1995), Turkish Greco-Roman wrestler
- Fatih Ceylan (born 1980), Turkish footballer
- Fatih Dönmez (born 1965), Turkish engineer and politician
- Fatih Egedik (born 1982), Turkish footballer
- Fatih Erbakan (born 1979), Turkish engineer and politician
- Fatih Erdin (born 1994), Turkish freestyle wrestler
- Fatih Erkoç (born 1953), Turkish jazz and pop music singer
- Fatih Eryıldırım (born 1979), Turkish hammer thrower
- Fatih Gul, Turkish physician and author
- Fatih Arda İpcioğlu (born 1997), Turkish ski jumper
- Fatih Kamaçi (born 1989), Dutch footballer
- Fatih Karahan (born 1982), Turkish economist
- Fatih Kaya (born 1999), German-Turkish footballer
- Fatih Keleş (born 1989), Turkish boxer
- Fatih Kıran (born 1993), German-Turkish footballer
- Fatih Kırtorun (born 1985), Turkish poet and translator
- Fatih Kısaparmak (born 1961), Turkish folk music singer and songwriter
- Fatih Kocamis (born 1974), Turkish-German mixed martial arts fighter
- Fatih Kuruçuk (born 1998), Turkish footballer
- Fatih Mehmet Maçoğlu (born 1968), Turkish politician
- Fatih Özbaş (born 1971), Turkish wrestler
- Fatih Özmen (born 1957/58), Turkish-American aerospace engineer
- Fatih Öztürk (footballer, born 1983) (born 1983), Turkish footballer
- Fatih Öztürk (footballer, born 1986) (born 1986), French-Turkish footballer
- Fatih Porikli, Turkish-American engineer
- Fatih Portakal (born 1967), Turkish journalist and television presenter
- Fatih Şahin (born 1979), Turkish politician and lawyer
- Fatih Abd Al Salam, Iraqi writer, novelist, storyteller, and journalist
- Fatih Yiğit Şanlıtürk (born 2003), Turkish footballer
- Fatih Şen (born 1984), Turkish footballer
- Fatih Şentürk, Turkish amputee footballer
- Fatih Solak (born 1980), Turkish basketball player
- Fatih Sonkaya (born 1981), Turkish footballer
- Fatih Takmaklı (born 1983), Turkish author
- Fatih Tekke (born 1977), Turkish footballer
- Fatih Terim (born 1953), Turkish football manager and player
- Fatih Tultak (born 2001), Turkish footballer
- Fatih Turan (born 1993), Turkish footballer
- Fatih Tutak (born 1985), Turkish chef
- Fatih Üçüncü (born 1989), Turkish Greco-Roman wrestler
- Fatih Yaşarlı (born 1991), Turkish freestyle wrestler
- Fatih Yiğen (born 1983), Turkish footballer
- Fatih Yiğituşağı (born 1983), Turkish footballer
- Fatih Yıldız (born 1971), Turkish diplomat
- Fatih Yılmaz (footballer, born 1989) (born 1989), German-Turkish footballer
- Fatih Yılmaz (footballer, born 2002) (born 2002), Turkish footballer

== See also ==
- Fateh (name)
- Mehmed the Conqueror (Turkish Fatih Sultan Mehmet)
