= Fatah (name) =

Fatah (Arabic: فَتْح fat·ḥ) is an Arabic name and surname, meaning "open, begin, start, commence". A variant of the name is Fattah, also spelt Fattaah (Arabic: فَتَّاح fattāḥ) which denotes the same or similar meaning.

Notable people with the name Fatah include:

- Abdul Fatah Haqqani (died 2011), Afghan alleged Taliban activist
- Abdel-Fatah Qudsiyeh (born 1953), deputy director of the Syrian National Security Bureau
- Abdoul Fatah (Malagasy politician), Malagasy politician
- Abdoul-Fatah Mustafa (born 1984), Cameroonian footballer
- Abdul Fatah Younis (1944–2011), Libyan senior military officer
- Chopy Fatah (born 1983), Kurdish singer
- Essam Abdel-Fatah (born 1965), Egyptian football referee
- Fatah Masoud (born 1989), Libyan futsal goalkeeper.
- Fatah Nsaief (born 1951), Iraqi football goalkeeper
- Fatah Said (born 1986), Moroccan footballer
- Mir-Fatah-Agha (died 1892), high-ranking Twelver Shi'a Muslim cleric in the Caucasus
- Natasha Fatah (born 1980), Canadian journalist
- Rebwar Fatah, Kurdish writer and journalist
- Ridzuan Fatah Hasan (born 1981), Singaporean football player
- Sherko Fatah (born 1964), German writer
- Tarek Fatah (1949–2023), Canadian writer, broadcaster, secularist and liberal activist
