= Fateh Singh =

Fateh Singh may refer to:

- Fateh Singh, founder of the Badal family of Badal, Punjab, India
- Fateh Singh (cricketer) (born 2004), English cricketer
- Fateh Singh (rapper) (born 1986), Indo-Canadian rapper, singer, and songwriter
- Fateh Singh (shooter), Indian army officer and Commonwealth sport shooting medalist
- Fateh Singh (Delhi politician) or Chaudhary Fateh Singh (born 1957), Indian politician from Delhi
- Fateh Singh (Sikhism) or Baba Fateh Singh, youngest son of Guru Gobind Singh Fateh Singh (Sikh leader) or Sant Fateh Singh (1911–1972), Indian Sikh leader
  - Akali Dal – Sant Fateh Singh Group, Indian political party
- Fateh Singh (Sikh warrior), Khalsa Sikh warrior, best known for avenging the deaths of the Baba Fateh Singh and Baba Zorawar Singh
- Fateh Singh of Udaipur and Mewar (1849–1930), Indian Maharana (king)
- Fateh Bahadur Singh, Indian politician from Uttar Pradesh, India
- Fateh Singh, fictional character portrayed by Sonu Sood in the 2025 Indian film Fateh

== See also ==
- Fateh (disambiguation)
- Fateh Singh Ahluwalia, Raja (king) of Kapurthala from 1801–1837
- Fateh Singh Rathore or Tiger Guru, Indian tiger conservationist
- Fateh Singh Rao Gaekwad, Maharaja of Baroda from 1778–1789
- Fatehsinghrao Gaekwad (1930–1988), titular Maharaja (king) of Baroda, India
- Fateh Singhpura railway station, Karauli, Rajasthan, India
