= Fattah =

Fattah (فتاح, Fattāḥ) may refer to:

- al-Fattāḥ, one of the names of God in Islam, and translates to "opener" or "victory giver"

== People with the given name or surname ==
Fattah is a male given name and surname in the Arabic language.

- Omar Fattah Hussain (born 1948), an Iraqi Kurdish politician
- Tamar Fattah Ramadhan Kuchar, an Iraqi Kurdish politician
- Chaka Fattah (born 1956), an American politician
- Parviz Fattah (born 1961), an Iranian politician

== Places ==
- Fattah, an alternative name for a village in West Azerbaijan Province, Iran

== Other ==
- Fattah (missile), an Iranian hypersonic medium-range ballistic missile developed by the Islamic Revolutionary Guard Corps

== See also ==
- Fatah (disambiguation)
- Fateh (disambiguation)
- Fath (disambiguation)
