= Julian de Guzman =

Canadian soccer player (born 1981)

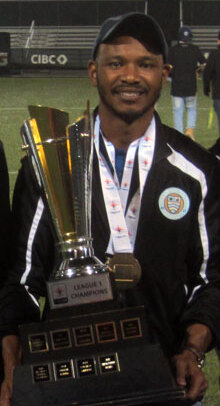
- De Guzman with Simcoe County Rovers in 2023

Personal information
- Full name: Julian Bobby de Guzman
- Date of birth: March 25, 1981 (age 45)
- Place of birth: Toronto, Ontario, Canada
- Height: 1.70 m (5 ft 7 in)
- Position: Midfielder

Youth career
- 1994–1997: North Scarborough SC
- 1997–2000: Marseille

Senior career*
Years	Team	Apps	(Gls)
2000–2001	1. FC Saarbrücken II	30	(5)
2001–2002	1. FC Saarbrücken	21	(0)
2002–2005	Hannover 96	78	(2)
2005–2009	Deportivo La Coruña	97	(1)
2009–2012	Toronto FC	65	(2)
2012	FC Dallas	12	(1)
2013	Jahn Regensburg	15	(0)
2013–2014	Skoda Xanthi	26	(0)
2015–2016	Ottawa Fury	26	(0)
Total		370	(11)

International career
1999–2001	Canada U20	13	(4)
2002–2016	Canada	89	(4)

Managerial career
- 2017: Ottawa Fury (assistant)
- 2017: Ottawa Fury (caretaker)
- 2017–2019: Ottawa Fury (general manager)
- 2021-2023: Simcoe County Rovers FC (president, sporting director)
- 2024–: New York Red Bulls (head of sport)
Medal record
Representing Canada
Men's soccer
CONCACAF Gold Cup
Third place	2002 United States
- * Club domestic league appearances and goals

Julian Bobby de Guzman (born March 25, 1981) is a Canadian soccer executive and former professional player and coach who currently serves as the Head of Sport for the New York Red Bulls in Major League Soccer.

A midfielder, De Guzman was the first Canadian to play in La Liga. While playing in Spain, he was voted 2007–08 Deportivo La Coruña Player of the Year.

De Guzman has played at both the Canadian U-20 and senior level, he was awarded the Canadian Player of the Year in 2008 and in 2007 became only the second Canadian international to be awarded the CONCACAF Gold Cup Most Valuable Player. He was the all-time cap leader of the Canada national team from November 2015, when he surpassed Paul Stalteri's previous record of 84 appearances, to November 2021, when Atiba Hutchinson surpassed De Guzman's final tally of 89 caps. From 2013 to 2016, he was captain of the Canada men's national team.

== Club career ==
=== Europe ===
De Guzman was discovered by representatives of Marseille while playing for the North Scarborough youth soccer club in Toronto. After playing with Marseille's reserve side, de Guzman became a first-team player with 1. FC Saarbrücken in the 2. Bundesliga in the 2000–01 season, where he made two appearances, and in the 2001–02 season, where he made 19 appearances. In 21 appearances he never scored.

In 2002, he joined newly promoted Hannover 96, becoming only the third Canadian to play in the Bundesliga. He made 20 appearances during 2002–03 season and 32 appearances in both 2003–04 and 2004–05 seasons.

De Guzman's contract with Hannover expired in 2005 allowing him to move to any team with no transfer fee. He was heavily linked with a move to Tottenham where he would have joined Canadian captain Paul Stalteri. He decided against the move to London due to the depth in the centre of mid-field, and instead chose to join Deportivo La Coruña in Spain becoming the first Canadian to play in La Liga. After playing a starring role in the club's remarkable turnaround in the 2007–2008 season to avoid relegation and gain a spot in the UEFA Cup, de Guzman was named the team's player of the season. In 95 appearances he scored one goal. His only goal with Deportivo came in 2005 against the Spanish giants Real Madrid. His contract with Deportivo expired in the summer of 2009.

=== Toronto FC ===
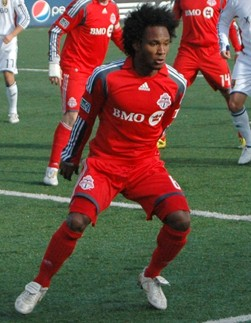
De Guzman playing for Toronto FC in 2010

In September 2009 an agreement was reached with Toronto FC for de Guzman to sign as a designated player, becoming the first ever Canadian Designated Player in league history. His contract was worth $1,910,746 annually. The Canadian midfielder signed a three-year deal to play in MLS. De Guzman made his debut for the club in an away game against the Los Angeles Galaxy on September 19, 2009. He finished the 2009 season with five appearances. De Guzman was able to convince former Deportivo teammate and friend Mista to join Toronto in July 2010. De Guzman was heavily criticized for his inconsistent performances as a designated player in the 2010 season making 36 appearances in all competitions. Much doubt was left over the future of de Guzman and Toronto on November 23 when the club failed to protect him for the 2010 MLS Expansion Draft, meaning Vancouver Whitecaps FC or Portland Timbers could select him if they were willing to take on a Designated Players Salary. However, he was untouched going through the sixth round when Vancouver selected O'Brian White which allowed Toronto to protect one player for the remaining four rounds in which they protected de Guzman . On January 5, 2011, de Guzman revealed that he would be undergoing knee surgery to repair a torn meniscus which might have plagued his performance for the last quarter of the season.

In January 2011, Toronto hired Aron Winter as the head coach of the club to bring in a new style of possession soccer, many pundits believed that this new style would benefit de Guzman's abilities and allow him to succeed within the MLS. Ten days before the new season kicked off it was revealed that de Guzman would miss this first game against Vancouver and potentially a few more, due to Winter not wanting to aggravate the recent successful surgery. De Guzman scored his first goal for Toronto in CONCACAF Champions League play against Tauro FC August 18, 2011, the game ended in a 2–0 away victory.

=== FC Dallas ===
On July 13, 2012, de Guzman was traded to FC Dallas in exchange for forward Andrew Wiedeman. De Guzman made his debut for Dallas against San Jose Earthquakes on July 18, the game ended in a 2–1 away defeat. De Guzman scored his only goal for Dallas on September 15 against Vancouver, a left footed volley more than 20 yards out six minutes into second half stoppage time.

De Guzman remained with FC Dallas through the 2012 season. His contract expired after 2012 and the club made him available for the 2012 MLS Re-Entry Draft in December 2012. de Guzman became a free agent after he went undrafted in both rounds of the draft.

=== Jahn Regensburg ===
On the last day of the 2012–13 winter transfer window, de Guzman joined SSV Jahn Regensburg. He made his debut for the team on February 3, playing all 90 minutes in a 1–5 loss against Hertha BSC. At the end of the season Jahn Regensburg was relegated from 2. Bundesliga, when De Guzman signed in January he had a clause that if they were relegated he would automatically become a free agent. He had made 15 appearances for the club.

=== Skoda Xanthi ===
Following the 2013 CONCACAF Gold Cup in late July, de Guzman signed for Skoda Xanthi in the Super League Greece. His debut came in a third round UEFA Europa League match against Standard Liège on August 1. He scored in the second leg of the series on August 8, but Skoda Xanthi would lose 4–2 on aggregate. He made his league debut for the club on August 17 in a 3–0 loss to PAOK After his contract expired, he looked for a club in or near Germany to be closer to his family, but he has not found anything as of yet.

=== Ottawa Fury ===
After several months without a club he was rumoured to be signing with Columbus Crew following a training spell with the MLS club, however a week later de Guzman signed with Ottawa Fury of the North American Soccer League on March 27, 2015. He made his debut on April 4 against the Carolina RailHawks.

On December 16, 2015, de Guzman re-signed with Ottawa for the 2016 season. He was subsequently named captain of the club on March 9, 2016.

=== Gloucester Celtic FC ===
He came out of retirement during the pandemic to play amateur soccer with local side Gloucester Celtic FC. He helped the team win the 2021 Ontario Cup.

== International career ==
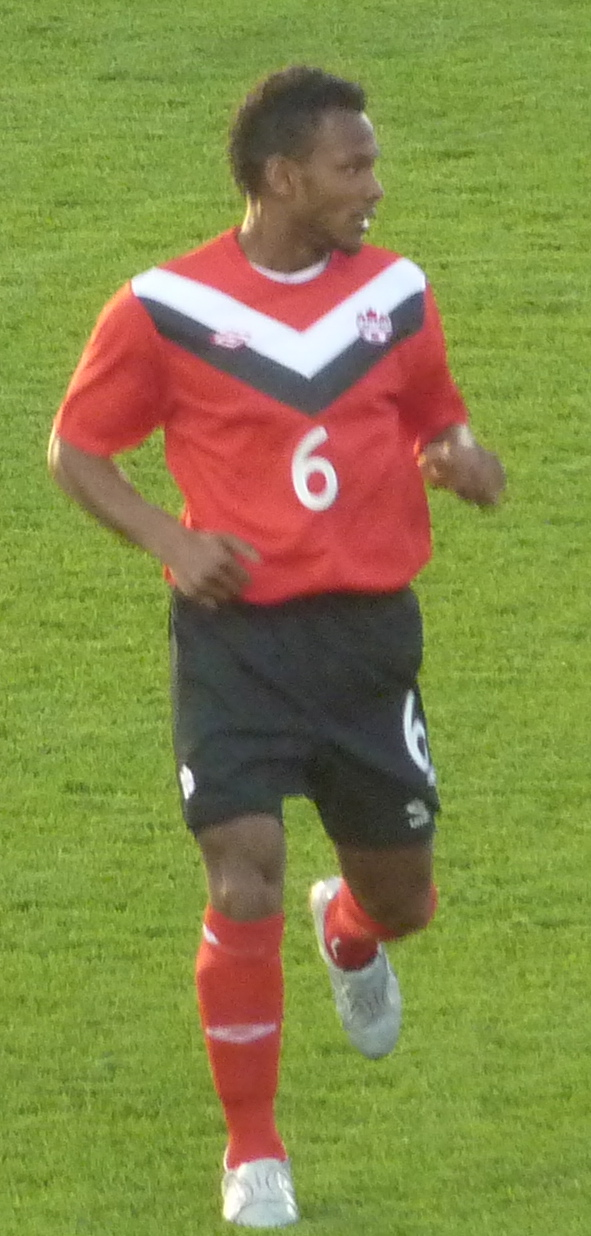
De Guzman playing against Ecuador at BMO Field on June 1, 2011

De Guzman played at the 2001 FIFA World Youth Championship in Argentina, alongside Atiba Hutchinson and Mike Klukowski among others.

He made his senior debut for Canada in a January 2002 CONCACAF Gold Cup match against Martinique. By July 2015, he earned a total of 82 caps, scoring 4 goals. He has represented Canada in 22 FIFA World Cup qualification matches.

In Canada's opening match of the 2007 CONCACAF Gold Cup, de Guzman scored twice to help defeat Costa Rica 2–1. After the conclusion of the competition, de Guzman was named tournament MVP.

De Guzman was also chosen in the 23-man roster for the 2009 CONCACAF Gold Cup, Canada won group A with seven points before being knocked out by Honduras in the quarter finals. He was later chosen in the all-tournament team along with fellow Canadian Michael Klukowski, this was the second time in a row he has been selected for this competition.

On June 1, 2011, in a friendly against Ecuador in the last minutes of play Canada was down 2–1 when de Guzman played a clever yet controversial quick free kick just outside the 18 yard box to Tosaint Ricketts who put in the net for his first ever international goal leading the Canadian team to a well earned draw. De Guzman earned his fiftieth cap for Canada's senior men's team on October 7, 2011, in a dominating 7–0 victory over Saint Lucia in a 2014 FIFA World Cup qualification match at Beausejour Stadium.

On November 17, 2015, de Guzman started for Canada against El Salvador in a 2018 World Cup qualifying match and overtook Paul Stalteri as Canada's most capped player in history earning his 85th cap.

== Coaching and executive career ==
On January 30, 2017, de Guzman announced his retirement from soccer and his transition to an assistant coaching position with the Ottawa Fury. On August 15, 2017, de Guzman was named interim head coach until the end of the 2017 season after the resignation of head coach Paul Dalglish.

On December 21, 2017, de Guzman was appointed general manager of the Ottawa Fury, alongside new head coach Nikola Popovic. He held the role until the Fury ceased operations at the end of 2019, following not receiving sanctioning to play in the US-based USL Championship.

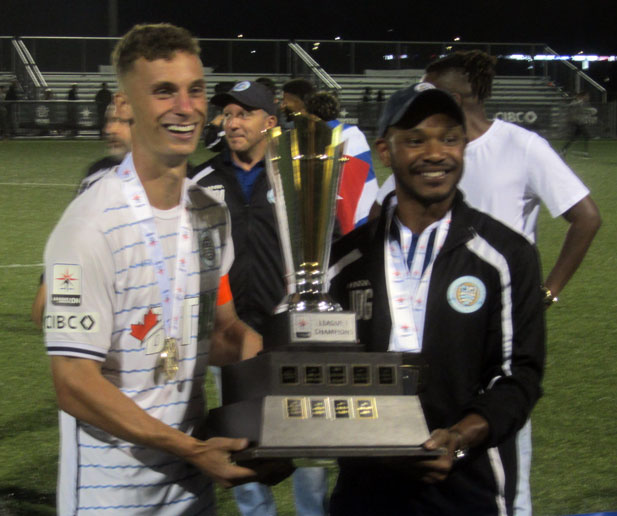
Justin Earle and Julian De Guzman with League1 Ontario Championship trophy

In 2020, it was announced that he was joining the newly formed club 1812 FC Barrie, where he will serve as president and co-owner. However, in January 2021, a major shift occurred with De Guzman departing the club, along with Peter Raco and the Barrie SC, to form a new club named Simcoe County Rovers. Serving as co-owner and Technical Director of the club, Simcoe County won the 2023 League1 Ontario title.

In February 2024, he was named Sporting Director of the New York Red Bulls in Major League Soccer.

On October 27, 2025 he was announced as the Head of Sport of the New York Red Bulls as part of a succession plan, succeeding Jochen Schneider.

== Personal life ==
De Guzman is of Filipino and Jamaican descent. Before his career, he attended Cardinal Newman Catholic High School from 1994 to 1997. His younger brother Jonathan de Guzmán also plays professional soccer for Dutch club Sparta Rotterdam and previously at Villarreal CF, Napoli, and Swansea FC, Eintracht Frankfurt and plays internationally for the Netherlands. His nephew Jaden de Guzmán is also a professional footballer.

== Career statistics ==
=== Club ===
Appearances and goals by club, season and competition
Club	Season	League			Cup		Continental		Other		Total		Ref.
Club	Season	League	Apps	Goals	Apps	Goals	Apps	Goals	Apps	Goals	Apps	Goals	Ref.
1. FC Saarbrücken II	2000–01	Oberliga Südwest	30	5	—		—		—		30	5	
1. FC Saarbrücken	2000–01	2. Bundesliga	2	0	0	0	—		—		2	0	
1. FC Saarbrücken	2001–02	2. Bundesliga	19	0	1	0	—		—		20	0	
1. FC Saarbrücken	Total		21	0	1	0	0	0	0	0	22	0	—
Hannover 96	2002–03	Bundesliga	18	0	2	0	—		—		20	0	
Hannover 96	2003–04	Bundesliga	30	2	2	0	—		—		32	2	
Hannover 96	2004–05	Bundesliga	30	0	2	0	—		—		32	0	
Hannover 96	Total		78	2	6	0	0	0	0	0	84	2	—
Deportivo La Coruña	2005–06	La Liga	22	1	4	0	4	0	—		30	1	
Deportivo La Coruña	2006–07	La Liga	20	0	3	0	—		—		23	0	
Deportivo La Coruña	2007–08	La Liga	35	0	0	0	—		—		35	0	
Deportivo La Coruña	2008–09	La Liga	20	0	3	0	5	0	—		28	0	
Deportivo La Coruña	Total		97	1	10	0	9	0	0	0	116	1	—
Toronto FC	2009	MLS	5	0	0	0	—		—		5	0	
Toronto FC	2010	MLS	25	0	3	0	6	0	—		34	0	
Toronto FC	2011	MLS	19	2	3	0	6	1	—		28	3	
Toronto FC	2012	MLS	16	0	4	0	3	0	—		23	0	
Toronto FC	Total		65	2	10	0	15	1	0	0	90	3	—
FC Dallas	2012	MLS	12	1	0	0	—		—		12	1	
Jahn Regensburg	2012–13	2. Bundesliga	15	0	0	0	—		—		15	0	
Skoda Xanthi	2013–14	Super League Greece	26	0	0	0	2	1	1	0	29	1	
Ottawa Fury	2015	NASL	15	0	1	0	—		1 (Note: Appearance in Soccer bowl)	0	17	0	
Ottawa Fury	2016	NASL	11	0	1	0	—		—		12	0	
Ottawa Fury	Total		26	0	2	0	0	0	1	0	29	0	—
Career total			370	11	29	0	26	2	1	0	426	13	—

=== International ===
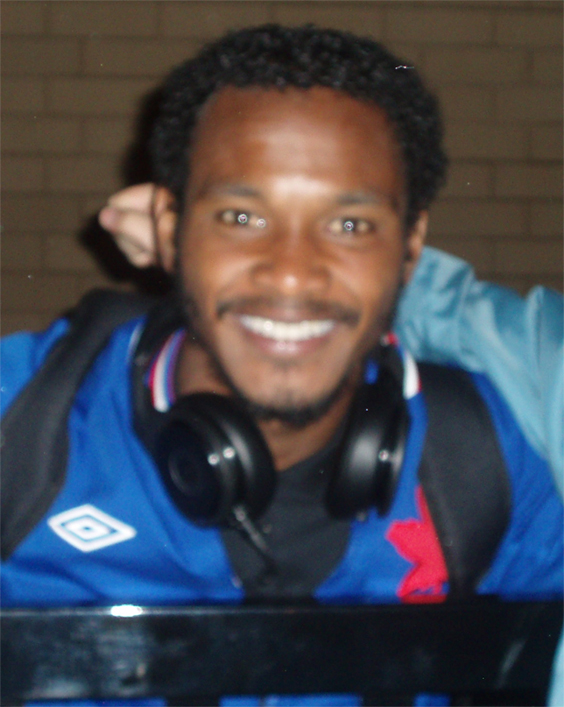
De Guzman with Canada on June 6, 2012

Appearances and goals by national team and year
National team	Year	Apps	Goals
Canada	2002	4	0
Canada	2003	2	0
Canada	2004	7	0
Canada	2005	2	0
Canada	2006	3	0
Canada	2007	10	2
Canada	2008	7	2
Canada	2009	7	0
Canada	2010	2	0
Canada	2011	8	0
Canada	2012	9	0
Canada	2013	8	0
Canada	2014	5	0
Canada	2015	11	0
Canada	2016	4	0
Total		89	4

Scores and results list Canada's goal tally first, score column indicates score after each de Guzman goal.

List of international goals scored by Julian de Guzman
No.	Date	Venue	Opponent	Score	Result	Competition
1	June 6, 2007	Miami Orange Bowl, Miami, U.S.	Costa Rica	1–1	2–1	2007 CONCACAF Gold Cup
2	June 6, 2007	Miami Orange Bowl, Miami, U.S.	Costa Rica	2–1	2–1	2007 CONCACAF Gold Cup
3	May 31, 2008	Qwest Field, Seattle, U.S.	Brazil	2–2	2–3	Friendly
4	August 20, 2008	BMO Field, Toronto, Canada	Jamaica	1–0	1–1	2010 FIFA World Cup Qualification

== Honours ==
=== Player ===
Canada

- CONCACAF Gold Cup: 3rd place, 2002

=== Individual ===
- CONCACAF Gold Cup Most Valuable Player: 2007
- CONCACAF Gold Cup All-Tournament Team: 2007, 2009
