= Kuwaiti Women's League =

- Founded: 2017
- Country: Kuwait
- Confederation: AFC
- Number of clubs: -
- Level on pyramid: 1
- Current: 2025–26 Kuwaiti Women's League

Kuwaiti Women's League was founded in 2017 organized by Kuwait Football Association as the First official Women's Championship in the Country, Set to be played 2019-20 or after as teams start to be organized and play Before kickoff.

== Teams ==
- Al-Qurain SC
- AUM
- Fumes
- Waves
- Al-Fatat SC
- Jags
- Salwa Alsabah SC

== See also ==
- AFC Women's Club Championship
