= Marco Djuricin =

Austrian footballer

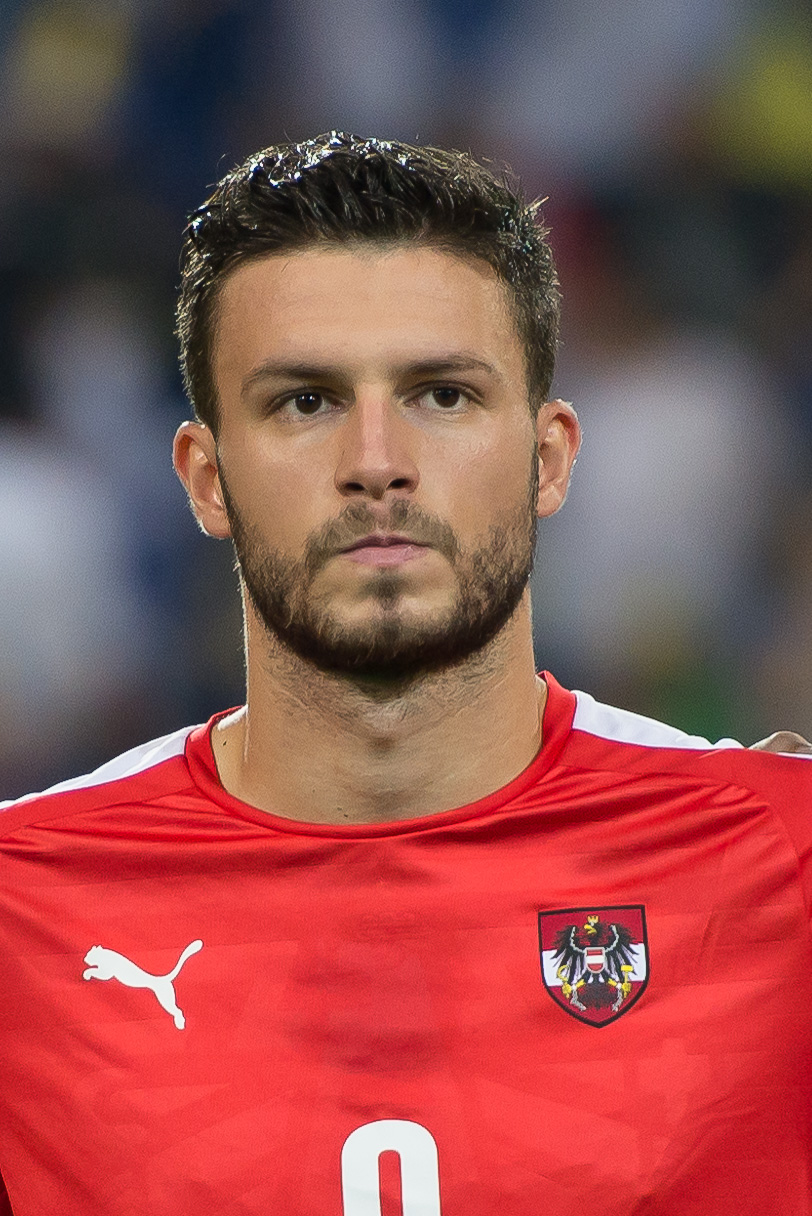
- Djuricin lining up for Austria U21 in 2014.

Personal information
- Full name: Marco Djuricin
- Date of birth: 12 December 1992 (age 33)
- Place of birth: Vienna, Austria
- Height: 1.83 m (6 ft 0 in)
- Position: Forward

Team information
- Current team: ASK Ebreichsdorf (player); Liesing ASK (individual coach)
- Number: 10

Youth career
- 1999–2003: SV Donau
- 2004–2005: Rapid Wien
- 2005–2006: Austria Wien
- 2006–2008: Rapid Wien
- 2008: FC Stadlau
- 2008–2010: Hertha BSC

Senior career*
Years	Team	Apps	(Gls)
2010–2012	Hertha BSC II	23	(12)
2010–2013	Hertha BSC	11	(2)
2012–2013	→ Jahn Regensburg (loan)	16	(3)
2012	→ Jahn Regensburg II (loan)	1	(3)
2013–2014	Sturm Graz	36	(17)
2015–2018	Red Bull Salzburg	16	(2)
2015–2016	→ Brentford (loan)	22	(4)
2016–2017	→ Ferencváros (loan)	25	(8)
2017–2018	→ Grasshoppers (loan)	23	(5)
2018–2019	Grasshoppers	23	(6)
2019–2021	Karlsruher SC	23	(0)
2021–2022	Austria Wien	48	(17)
2021–2022	Austria Wien II	1	(1)
2022–2024	Rijeka	5	(0)
2023–2024	→ Spartak Trnava (loan)	4	(3)
2025	SV Stripfing	11	(6)
2025–2026	First Vienna	9	(2)
2026	SKN St. Pölten	9	(1)
2026–	ASK Ebreichsdorf	1	(0)

International career
2008	Austria U17	5	(3)
2009	Austria U18	1	(0)
2009–2010	Austria U19	12	(4)
2012–2014	Austria U21	8	(2)
2015	Austria	2	(0)
- * Club domestic league appearances and goals as of 22:41, 12 August 2026 (UTC)

Marco Djuricin (Croatian: Marko Đuričin, Serbian: Марко Ђуричин; born 12 December 1992) is an Austrian former professional footballer who plays as a forward for 1. Niederösterreichische Landesliga club ASK Ebreichsdorf.

Djuricin came to prominence in his native Austria with Sturm Graz, scoring 24 goals in 44 appearances, before joining Red Bull Salzburg in 2015. He also played professionally in Germany, England, Hungary, Switzerland, Croatia and Slovakia and retired in 2026. Djuricin was capped twice by Austria at international level. Djuricin began coaching prior to his retirement as a professional player and is currently individual coach at Liesing ASK.

== Club career ==
=== Hertha BSC ===
A forward, Djuricin began his career with SV Donau in 1999, before have alternate spells with Rapid Wien and Austria Wien. After a short spell with FC Stadlau in 2008, he moved to Germany to enter the youth academy at Bundesliga club Hertha BSC. During the 2009–10 season, Hertha's U19 team reached the final of the DFB Youth Cup, but despite Djuricin's equaliser, Hertha lost the match 2–1 to 1899 Hoffenheim. During the 2010–11 pre-season, Djuricin was called up to the first team's training camp in his native Austria. Coach Markus Babbel was impressed by his performance during the camp and called in him up for Hertha's remaining pre-season friendlies.

==== Breakthrough and Jahn Regensburg loan ====
Djuricin made his debut for Hertha's reserve team in a 2–2 Regionalliga Nord draw with Hallescher FC on 6 August 2010. Following injuries to Patrick Ebert, Raffael and Daniel Beichler, Djuricin received his maiden first team call up on the opening day of the 2010–11 2. Bundesliga season against Rot-Weiß Oberhausen. He made his debut after just 18 minutes as a substitute for Rob Friend. Djuricin had a dream debut, scoring two second-half goals to help Hertha to a 3–2 win. He signed a new four-year contract shortly after the match. Djuricin went on to make 9 appearances during a successful 2010–11 season for Hertha, which saw the club promoted back to the Bundesliga at the first time of asking.

Djuricin spent the majority of the 2011–12 Bundesliga season with the reserves, scoring 9 goals in 16 appearances. He made two first team substitute appearances in early 2012 and was on the bench for both of Hertha's relegation playoff matches, which were lost to Fortuna Düsseldorf and consigned the club to relegation straight back to the 2. Bundesliga. During the 2012 off-season, new Hertha manager Jos Luhukay announced that Djuricin was not in his first team plans.

On 9 August 2012, Djuricin joined 2. Bundesliga club Jahn Regensburg on loan for the duration of the 2012–13 season. He missed two months of the campaign with a broken sesamoid in his foot and made 17 appearances and scored three goals in a dire season for the Jahn, with a bottom-place finish consigning the club to relegation to the 3. Liga.

Djuricin departed Hertha in June 2013, after making just 11 appearances and scoring two goals during three seasons as a first team player at the Olympiastadion.

=== Sturm Graz ===
Djuricin returned to Austria to sign a contract with Austrian Bundesliga club Sturm Graz in June 2013. He made his debut in a 0–0 UEFA Europa League second qualifying round draw with Breiðablik on 18 July 2013, the first European appearance of his career. After just two further appearances, a cruciate ligament injury saw Djuricin fail to return to the team until December. He finished the 2013–14 season with 23 appearances and seven goals. Djuricin showed good goalscoring form in the first half of the 2014–15 season, scoring 17 goals in 21 games before departing the UPC-Arena on 8 January 2015. He made 44 appearances and scored 24 goals during 18 months with Graz.

=== Red Bull Salzburg and loans ===
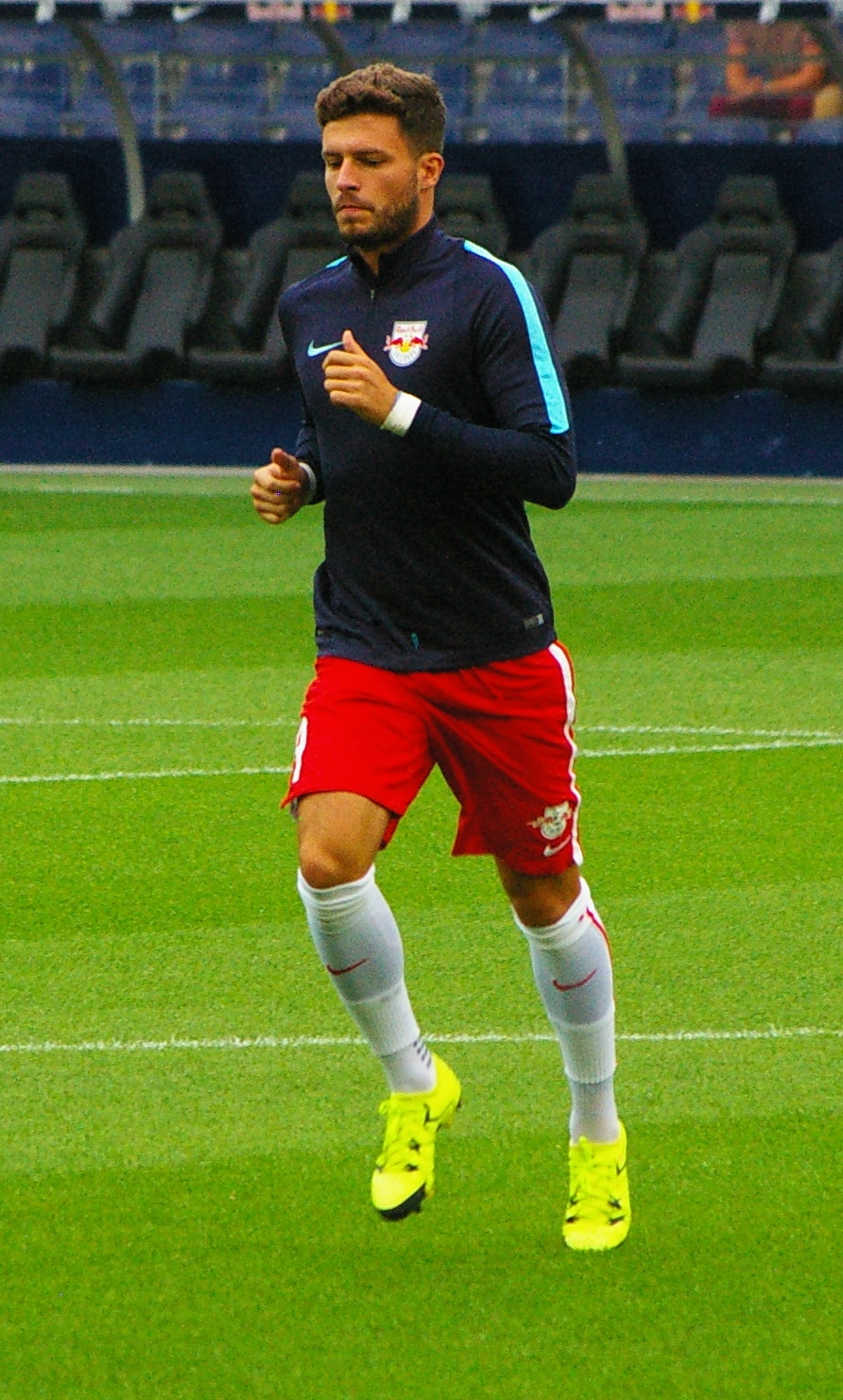
Djuricin warming up with Red Bull Salzburg in 2015

On 8 January 2015, Djuricin signed a 3 1/2-year contract with Austrian Bundesliga club Red Bull Salzburg. He scored just three goals in 16 appearances in the second half of the 2014–15 season, but received the first silverware of his career when Salzburg won the league title at the end of the campaign. He collected another medal by virtue of being an unused substitute in Salzburg's 2–0 victory over Austria Wien in the 2015 ÖFB Cup Final.

After four appearances early in the 2015–16 season, Djuricin moved to England to sign for Championship club Brentford on loan until the end of the 2015–16 season. He scored within 29 minutes of his debut in a 1–1 draw with against Leeds United on 12 September and made it two goals in three games with the winner versus Preston North End one week later. He came into form again in late October, scoring in wins over Wolverhampton Wanderers and Queens Park Rangers, the latter match being Brentford's first win over their West London rivals for fifty years. An ankle ligament injury suffered early in a 1–1 draw with Blackburn Rovers on 7 November kept Djuricin out of the team for two months. He returned to the bench in mid-January 2016 and broke back into the starting lineup in late February, but was sidelined due to illness in March. Djuricin made just two further appearances and finished the season with 4 goals from 23 appearances.

On 23 June 2016, Djuricin joined Nemzeti Bajnokság I club Ferencváros on loan for the duration of the 2016–17 season. He made 30 appearances and scored 10 goals during the season, but was left out of the matchday squad which emerged victorious in the 2017 Magyar Kupa Final. Following a further season-long loan during the 2017–18 season, Djuricin left the club when his contract expired at the end of the 2017–18 season.

=== Grasshoppers ===
In July 2017, Djuricin moved to Swiss Super League club Grasshopper Club Zürich on a season-long loan, with the option to transfer permanently. He made 25 appearances and scored 9 goals during the 2017–18 season and permanently joined the club on a two-year contract. After 24 appearances and seven goals during the 2018–19 season, Djuricin departed the club.

=== Karlsruher SC ===
On 14 June 2019, Djuricin returned to Germany to join 2. Bundesliga club Karlsruher SC on a two-year contract. He finished the 2019–20 season with 19 appearances. After making just seven appearances during the first half of the 2020–21 season, Djuricin's contract was terminated by mutual consent on 31 January 2021.

=== Austria Wien ===
On 2 February 2021, Djuricin signed a contract with Austrian Bundesliga club Austria Wien on a free transfer. In what remained of the 2020–21 season, he scored seven goals in 17 appearances, helped the club qualify for the 2021–22 Europa Conference League and signed a new three-year contract. During the 2021–22 season, Djuricin scored 11 goals in 32 appearances and helped the club qualify for the 2022–23 Europa League play-off round. He recovered from off-season myocarditis to make four appearances and score one goal during the opening weeks of the 2022–23 season, before departing the club. Djuricin made 53 appearances and scored 19 goals during 18 months at the Franz Horr Stadium.

=== HNK Rijeka and loan to Spartak Trnava ===
On 31 August 2022, Djuricin transferred to Croatian First League club Rijeka and signed a three-year contract. He made five appearances prior to the 2022–23 winter break, after which he was frozen out of the squad by incoming head coach Sergej Jakirović. On 6 July 2023, Djuricin joined Slovak First League club Spartak Trnava on loan for the duration of the 2023–24 season. Myocarditis restricted him to just 11 appearances during the season, in which he scored four goals. The result of a visit to Bayern Munich's heart specialist necessitated a six-month break from football and despite returning for the 2024–25 pre-season, Djuricin's contract was terminated.

=== SV Stripfing ===
Following a number of months training with SV Stripfing, Djuricin signed a contract with the Austrian 2. Liga club on 17 January 2025. His debut and first appearance at any level for just shy of a year came as a second-half substitute in a 2–0 Austrian Cup quarter-final defeat to TSV Hartberg on 31 January 2025. Two yellow cards received during second half injury time led to Djuricin being sent off. He made 12 appearances and scored six goals during the remainder of the 2024–25 season, at the end of which the club narrowly avoided relegation. Djuricin departed the club after the season.

=== First Vienna ===
On 30 May 2025, Djuricin signed a two-year contract with Austrian 2. Liga club First Vienna. He scored two goals in 10 appearances prior to the termination of his contract on 12 January 2026.

=== SKN St. Pölten ===
On 17 January 2026, Djuricin transferred to Austrian 2. Liga club SKN St. Pölten and signed an undisclosed-length contract on a free transfer. He made 9 appearances and scored one goal during the remainder of the 2025–26 season, which culminated in the club narrowly missing promotion to the Austrian Bundesliga. Shortly after the end of the season, Djuricin announced his retirement as a professional player and departed the club.

=== ASK Ebreichsdorf ===
In June 2026, Djuricin transferred to 1. Niederösterreichische Landesliga club ASK Ebreichsdorf.

== International career ==
Djuricin won 26 caps and scored 9 goals for Austria between under-17 and under-21 level. He scored a penalty at the 2010 UEFA European Under-19 Championship and the resulting win over the Netherlands qualified the team for the 2011 FIFA U-20 World Cup in Colombia, though he would miss the tournament through injury. He won two caps for the senior team in March 2015, in a 5–0 UEFA Euro 2016 qualifying over Liechtenstein and a 1–1 friendly draw with Bosnia and Herzegovina.

== Coaching career ==
On 18 October 2024, Djuricin was appointed under-7 coach at Austrian lower league club Liesing ASK. On 3 August 2025, he was announced as individual coach of the first team squad.

== Personal life ==
Djuricin is of Serbian and Croatian descent. His father, Goran, is a former footballer and a manager.

== Career statistics ==
=== Club ===
As of match played 8 August 2026

Appearances and goals by club, season and competition
Club	Season	League			Cup^{1}		Europe^{2}		Total		Ref.
Club	Season	League	Apps	Goals	Apps	Goals	Apps	Goals	Apps	Goals	Ref.
Hertha BSC II	2010–11	Regionalliga Nord	7	3	—		—		7	3	
Hertha BSC II	2011–12	Regionalliga Nord	16	9	—		—		16	9	
Hertha BSC II	Total		23	12	—		—		23	12	—
Hertha BSC	2010–11	2. Bundesliga	9	2	0	0	—		9	2	
Hertha BSC	2011–12	Bundesliga	2	0	0	0	—		2	0	
Hertha BSC	Total		11	2	0	0	—		11	2	—
Jahn Regensburg (loan)	2012–13	2. Bundesliga	16	3	1	0	—		17	3	
Jahn Regensburg II (loan)	2012–13	Bayernliga Süd	1	3	—		—		1	3	
Sturm Graz	2013–14	Austrian Bundesliga	18	6	3	1	2	0	23	7	
Sturm Graz	2014–15	Austrian Bundesliga	18	11	3	6	—		21	17	
Sturm Graz	Total		36	17	6	7	2	0	44	24	—
Red Bull Salzburg	2014–15	Austrian Bundesliga	13	2	1	0	2	1	16	3	
Red Bull Salzburg	2015–16	Austrian Bundesliga	3	0	1	3	1	0	5	3	
Red Bull Salzburg	Total		16	2	2	3	3	1	21	6	—
Brentford (loan)	2015–16	Championship	22	4	1	0	—		23	4	
Ferencváros (loan)	2016–17	Nemzeti Bajnokság I	25	8	3	2	2	0	30	10	
Grasshoppers (loan)	2017–18	Swiss Super League	23	5	2	4	—		25	9	
Grasshoppers	2018–19	Swiss Super League	23	6	1	1	—		24	7	
Karlsruher SC	2019–20	2. Bundesliga	17	0	2	0	—		19	0	
Karlsruher SC	2020–21	2. Bundesliga	6	0	1	0	—		7	0	
Karlsruher SC	Total		23	0	3	0	—		26	0	—
Austria Wien	2020–21	Austrian Bundesliga	17	7	0	0	—		17	7	
Austria Wien	2021–22	Austrian Bundesliga	28	9	2	1	2	1	32	11	
Austria Wien	2022–23	Austrian Bundesliga	3	1	—		1	0	4	1	
Austria Wien	Total		48	17	2	1	3	1	53	19	—
Austria Wien II	2020–21	Austrian 2. Liga	1	1	—		—		1	1	
Rijeka	2022–23	Croatian First League	5	0	0	0	—		5	0	
Spartak Trnava (loan)	2023–24	Slovak First League	4	3	1	0	6	1	11	4	
SV Stripfing	2024–25	Austrian 2. Liga	11	6	1	0	—		12	6	
First Vienna	2025–26	Austrian 2. Liga	9	2	1	0	—		10	2	
SKN St. Pölten	2025–26	Austrian 2. Liga	9	1	—		—		9	1	
ASK Ebreichsdorf	2026–27	1. Niederösterreichische Landesliga	1	0	0	0	—		1	0	
Career total			307	92	24	18	16	3	347	113	—

- 1.Includes DFB-Pokal, Austrian Cup, FA Cup, Magyar Kupa, Swiss Cup, Croatian Cup and Slovak Cup.
- 2.Includes UEFA Europa League, UEFA Champions League and UEFA Europa Conference League.

=== International ===
Appearances and goals by national team and year
National team	Year	Apps	Goals
Austria	2015	2	0
Total		2	0

== Honours ==
Red Bull Salzburg

- Austrian Bundesliga: 2014–15
- Austrian Cup: 2014–15
