= Jaden de Guzmán =

Dutch footballer (born 2007)

Personal information
- Full name: Jaden Noah de Guzmán
- Date of birth: 18 January 2007 (age 19)
- Place of birth: Rotterdam, Netherlands
- Height: 1.73 m (5 ft 8 in)
- Position: Midfielder

Team information
- Current team: Jong PSV

Youth career
- RKDEO
- 2014–2022: Feyenoord
- 2022–: PSV

Senior career*
Years	Team	Apps	(Gls)
2023–	Jong PSV	2	(0)
2026	→ Jong Sparta (loan)	2	(0)

International career^{‡}
2022	Netherlands U15	1	(0)
2023	Netherlands U16	3	(0)
2023–2024	Netherlands U17	5	(0)
2024–2025	Netherlands U18	3	(1)
2025–	Netherlands U19	2	(0)
- * Club domestic league appearances and goals as of 17 September 2026 ‡ National team caps and goals as of 15:41, 19 January 2026 (UTC)

Jaden Noah de Guzmán (born 18 January 2007) is a Dutch professional footballer who plays as a midfielder for Jong PSV.

== Club career ==
De Guzmán is a youth product of RKDEO and Feyenoord. On 23 June 2022, de Guzman signed with the PSV Eindhoven academy until 2025. He made his professional debut with Jong PSV in a 4–3 Eerste Divisie loss to FC Eindhoven on 23 October 2023. On 15 October 2024, he was named by English newspaper The Guardian as one of the best players born in 2007 worldwide. On 19 January 2026, de Guzmán joined Sparta Rotterdam on loan until the end of the season with an option to buy. He was assigned to the Jong Sparta team.

== International career ==
De Guzmán was born in the Netherlands, to a Canadian-born father of Jamaican and Filipino descent, and Dutch-born mother of Indonesian descent. He is a youth international for the Netherlands. He was called up to the Netherlands U18s in September 2024.

== Personal life ==
De Guzmán is the son of the Dutch international footballer Jonathan de Guzmán, and nephew of the Canadian international Julian de Guzman.
