= Wilson Kamavuaka =

Congolese footballer (born 1990)

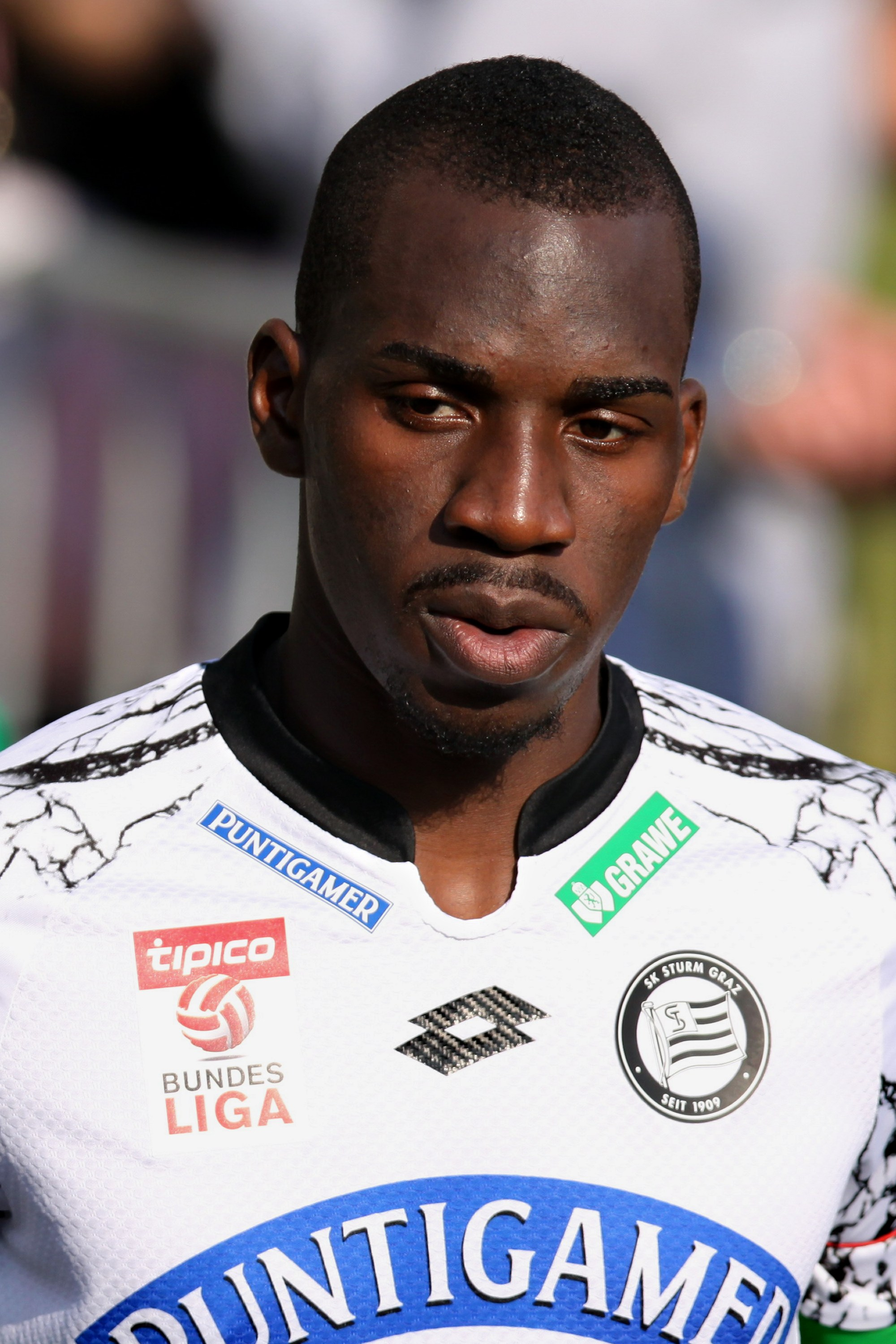
- Kamavuaka with Sturm Graz in September 2015

Personal information
- Date of birth: 29 March 1990 (age 36)
- Place of birth: Düren, West Germany
- Height: 1.88 m (6 ft 2 in)
- Positions: Defensive midfielder; centre-back

Team information
- Current team: Dudelange
- Number: 36

Youth career
- 1999–2007: Sportfreunde Düren
- 2007–2009: Alemannia Aachen

Senior career*
Years	Team	Apps	(Gls)
2009–2011	1899 Hoffenheim II	40	(4)
2011–2013	1. FC Nürnberg	5	(0)
2011–2013	1. FC Nürnberg II	24	(2)
2012–2013	→ Jahn Regensburg (loan)	28	(1)
2013–2014	KV Mechelen	16	(3)
2015–2016	Sturm Graz	38	(0)
2015	Sturm Graz II	1	(0)
2016–2017	Panetolikos	7	(0)
2017–2019	Darmstadt 98	39	(2)
2020	GKS Tychy	10	(1)
2020–2021	MSV Duisburg	26	(3)
2022	HIFK	5	(1)
2023–2025	UT Pétange	64	(8)
2026–	Dudelange	8	(0)

International career
2010–2017	DR Congo	10	(0)
- * Club domestic league appearances and goals as of 13 June 2026

Wilson Kamavuaka (born 29 March 1990) is a professional footballer who plays for Dudelange.

== Club career ==
Kamavuaka was born in Düren, Germany.

On 1 February 2015, after being without a club for seven months, Kamavuaka joined Austrian Bundesliga side Sturm Graz. He signed a contract until the end of the 2014–15 season, which includes an extension clause for another two years.

On 9 September 2016, he signed a two-year contract with Panetolikos F.C. of the Super League Greece.

In summer 2020, he moved to 3. Liga club MSV Duisburg. He signed a one-season contract with the option of another season. He left Duisburg at the end of the 2020–21 season.

On 28 March 2022, Kamavuaka signed with HIFK in Finland. His contract with HIFK was terminated on 30 June 2022.

== Career statistics ==
=== Club ===
As of 16 December 2024

Appearances and goals by club, season and competition
Club	Season	Division	League		Cup		Other		Total	
Club	Season	Division	Apps	Goals	Apps	Goals	Apps	Goals	Apps	Goals
1899 Hoffenheim II	2009–10	Oberliga Baden-Württemberg	19	3	—		—		19	3
1899 Hoffenheim II	2010–11	Regionalliga Süd	21	1	—		—		21	1
1899 Hoffenheim II	Total		40	4	—		—		40	4
1. FC Nürnberg	2011–12	Bundesliga	5	0	0	0	—		5	0
1. FC Nürnberg	2012–13	Bundesliga	0	0	0	0	—		0	0
1. FC Nürnberg	Total		5	0	0	0	—		5	0
1. FC Nürnberg II	2011–12	Regionalliga Süd	21	1	—		—		21	1
1. FC Nürnberg II	2012–13	Regionalliga Bayern	3	1	—		—		3	1
1. FC Nürnberg II	Total		24	2	—		—		24	2
Jahn Regensburg	2012–13	2. Bundesliga	28	1	0	0	—		28	1
KV Mechelen	2013–14	Belgian First Division A	16	3	1	0	2 (Note: Appearances in Europa League playoff)	0	19	3
Sturm Graz	2014–15	Austrian Bundesliga	7	0	0	0	—		7	0
Sturm Graz	2015–16	Austrian Bundesliga	31	0	4	0	2 (Note: Appearances in Europa League)	0	37	0
Sturm Graz	Total		38	0	4	0	2	0	44	0
Sturm Graz II	2014–15	Austrian Regionalliga	1	0	—		—		1	0
Panetolikos	2016–17	Super League Greece	7	0	3	0	—		10	0
Darmstadt 98	2016–17	Bundesliga	8	0	0	0	—		5	0
Darmstadt 98	2017–18	2. Bundesliga	25	2	1	0	—		26	2
Darmstadt 98	2018–19	2. Bundesliga	6	0	0	0	—		6	0
Darmstadt 98	Total		39	2	1	0	—		40	2
GKS Tychy	2019–20	I liga	10	1	1	0	—		11	1
MSV Duisburg	2020–21	3. Liga	26	3	2	0	—		28	3
HIFK	2022	Veikkausliiga	5	1	2	0	0	0	7	1
Union Titus Pétange	2023–24	Luxembourg National Division	20	3	0	0	–		20	3
Union Titus Pétange	2024–25	Luxembourg National Division	14	1	1	0	–		15	1
Union Titus Pétange	Total		34	4	1	0	0	0	35	4
Career total			274	21	13	0	4	0	292	21

=== International ===
As of match played 26 March 2017

Appearances and goals by national team and year
National team	Year	Apps	Goals
DR Congo	2010	3	0
DR Congo	2011	1	0
DR Congo	2012	0	0
DR Congo	2013	0	0
DR Congo	2014	0	0
DR Congo	2015	5	0
DR Congo	2016	0	0
DR Congo	2017	1	0
Total		10	0

== Personal life ==
Fellow professional footballer Richard Sukuta-Pasu is his second cousin.
