= Thiemo-Jérôme Kialka =

German footballer

Personal information
- Date of birth: 12 January 1989 (age 37)
- Place of birth: Hamburg, West Germany
- Height: 1.80 m (5 ft 11 in)
- Position: Forward

Youth career
- 1994–2002: TSV 08 Eppendorf-Groß-Borstel
- 2002–2007: VfL 93 Hamburg
- 2007–2008: 1. FC Köln

Senior career*
Years	Team	Apps	(Gls)
2008–2012	1. FC Köln II	76	(29)
2011–2012	1. FC Köln	0	(0)
2012–2013	Jahn Regensburg	21	(0)
2013–2015	Fortuna Köln	62	(15)
2016	VfL Köln 99	8	(12)
2017	Bonner SC	2	(0)
Total		169	(56)
- * Club domestic league appearances and goals

Thiemo-Jérôme Kialka (born 12 January 1989) is a German former professional footballer who played as a forward. He made his professional debut with Jahn Regensburg on 31 January 2012 in a 3. Liga match against VfB Stuttgart II.
