= André Laurito =

Congolese footballer

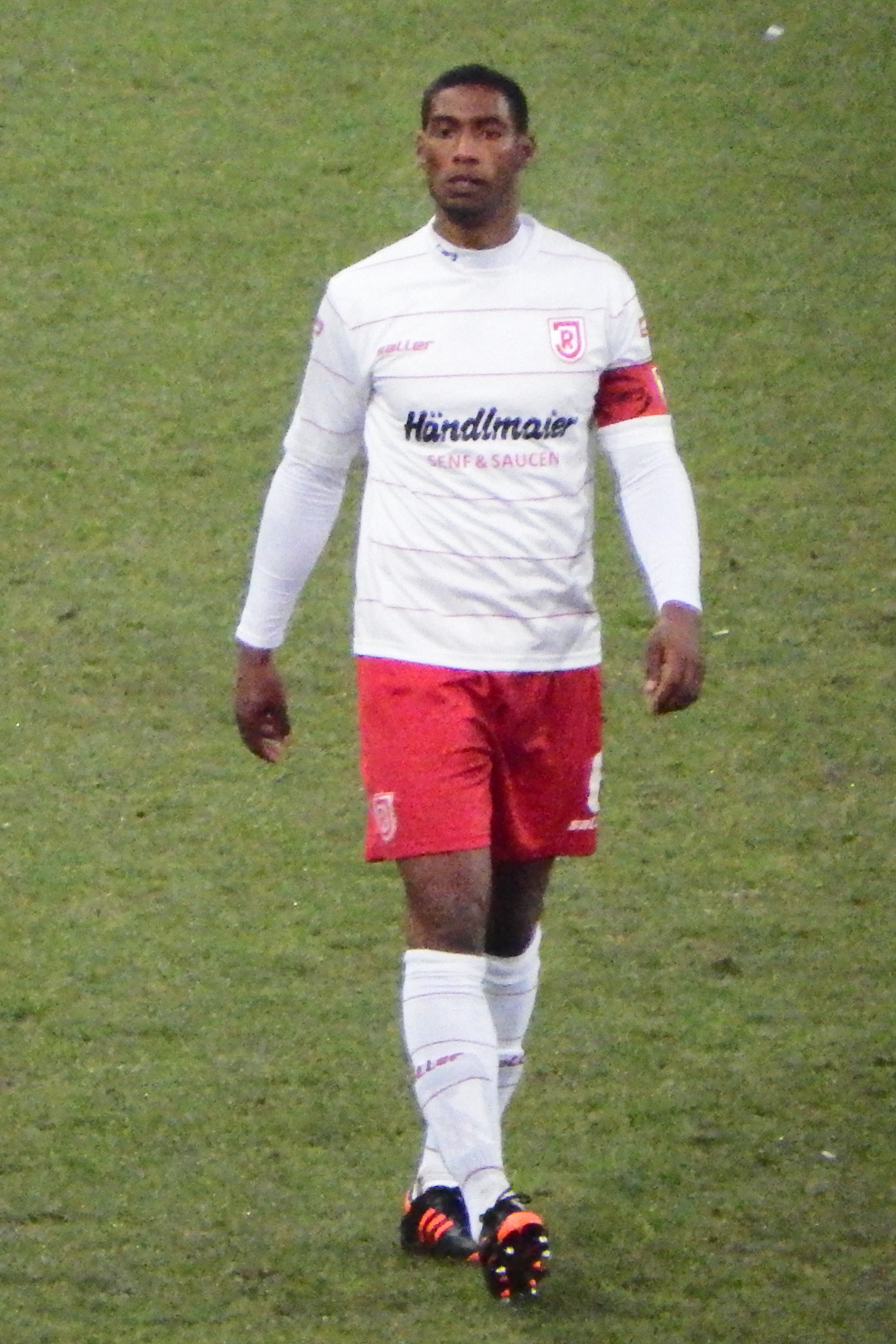
- Laurito in 2013

Personal information
- Date of birth: 24 November 1983 (age 42)
- Place of birth: Kinshasa, Zaire
- Height: 1.86 m (6 ft 1 in)
- Position: Defender

Team information
- Current team: SV Donaustauf
- Number: 4

Youth career
- TSV Klein-Linden
- –2004: FSV Steinbach

Senior career*
Years	Team	Apps	(Gls)
2004–2008	FSV Frankfurt	66	(3)
2008–2009	Viktoria Aschaffenburg	28	(0)
2009–2010	1. FC Eintracht Bamberg	22	(1)
2010–2013	SSV Jahn Regensburg	76	(8)
2013–2018	Rot-Weiß Erfurt	106	(6)
2014–2018	Rot-Weiß Erfurt II	2	(0)
2018–2019	TSV Kerspleben	0	(0)
2022–	SV Donaustauf	1	(0)
- * Club domestic league appearances and goals as of 12 November 2022

André Laurito (born 24 November 1983) is a German footballer who plays for Bayernliga club SV Donaustauf.

== Professional career ==
Laurito made his professional debut for SSV Jahn Regensburg in the opening fixture of the 2010–11 3. Fußball-Liga season away to SV Werder Bremen II.

== Personal life ==
Laurito was born in Kinshasa, Zaire to an Italian father and a Congolese mother. He emigrated to Germany at a young age.
