= Fatih Mosque (disambiguation) =

Fatih Mosque (Turkish: Fatih Camii, 'Mosque of the Conquest') may refer to:

In Albania

- Fatih Mosque, Durrës
- Fatih Sultan Mehmet Mosque, Shkodër

In Austria

- Fatih Mosque, Vienna

In Bahrain

- Fatih Mosque, Manama

In Lebanon

- Fatih Mosque, Beirut

In Germany

- Fatih Mosque, Bremen
- Fatih Mosque, Heilbronn
- Fatih Mosque, Pforzheim
- Fatih Mosque, Stadtallendorf

In the Netherlands

- Fatih Mosque, Amsterdam
- Fatih Mosque, Eindhoven
- Fatih Mosque, Maastricht

In Saudi Arabia

- Fatih Mosque, Medina

In Switzerland

- Fatih Mosque, Zug

In Turkey

- Fatih Mosque, Istanbul
- Fatih Mosque, Tirilye, Bursa Province
- Fatih Mosque, Trabzon

== See also ==
- Fethiye Mosque (disambiguation)
