= Fethiye Mosque =

Fethiye Mosque (Turkish: Fethiye Camii) can refer to a number of Ottoman mosques dedicated to the conquest (Fatih) of a city or region:

- Fethiye Mosque (Istanbul) in Istanbul, the former Byzantine Pammakaristos Church
- Fethiye Mosque (Athens), in Athens, Greece
- Fethiye Mosque (Ioannina), in Ioannina, Greece
- Fethiye Mosque (Krujë), in Krujë, Albania
- Fethiye Mosque (Naupactus), in Naupactus, Greece

== See also ==
- Fethija Mosque (Bihać)
- Fatih Mosque (disambiguation)
