= Bernhard Hendl =

Austrian footballer

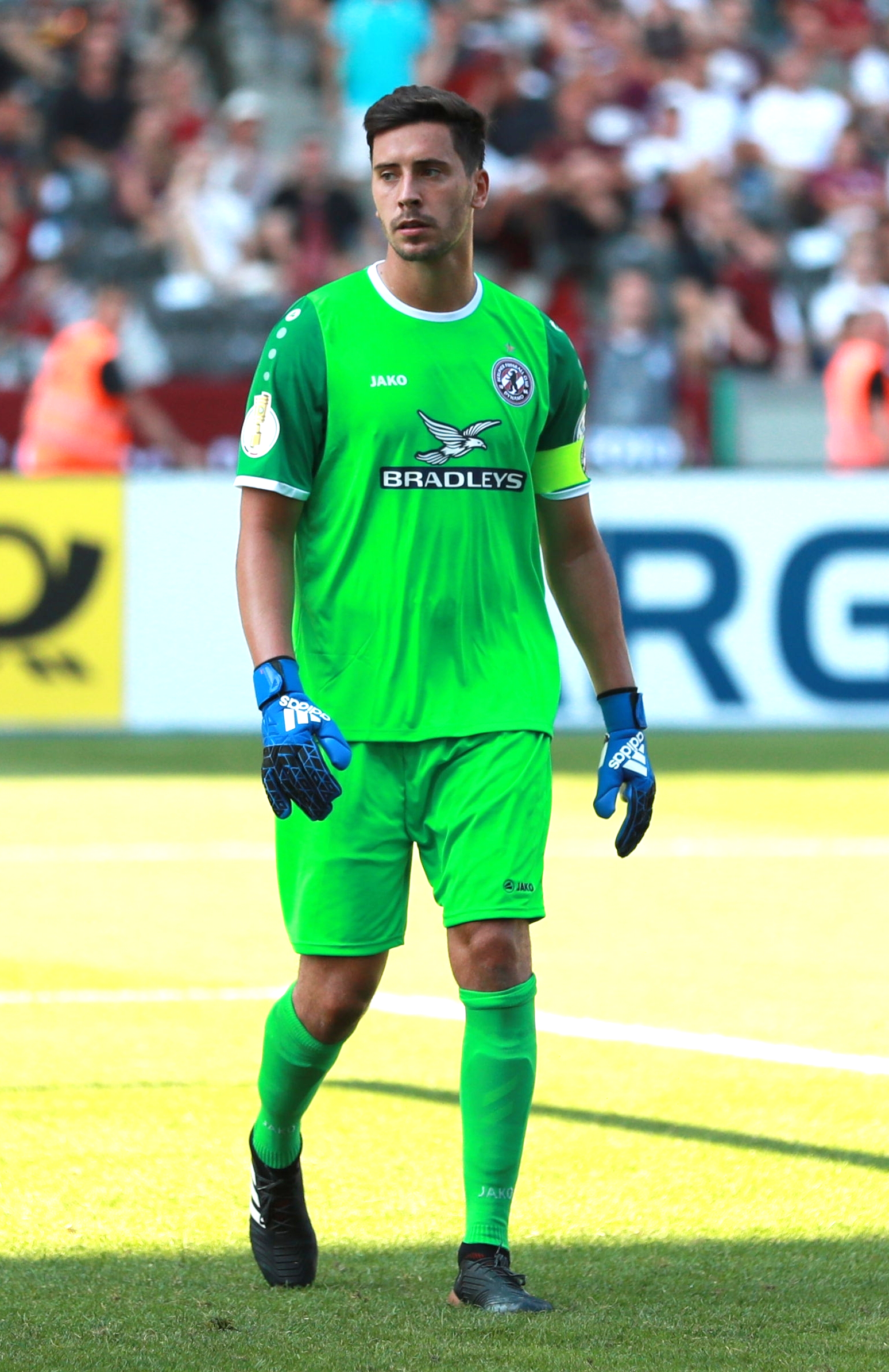
- Hendl in 2018

Personal information
- Date of birth: 9 August 1992 (age 34)
- Place of birth: Vienna, Austria
- Height: 1.97 m (6 ft 5 1/2 in)
- Position: Goalkeeper

Team information
- Current team: First Vienna FC
- Number: 1

Youth career
- 1999–2004: First Vienna FC
- 2004–2006: SK Rapid Wien
- 2006–2010: FC Admira Wacker

Senior career*
Years	Team	Apps	(Gls)
2010–2011	SV Wehen Wiesbaden	0	(0)
2012–2013	VfB Stuttgart	0	(0)
2013–2014	SSV Jahn Regensburg	24	(0)
2014–2015	1. FSV Mainz 05 II	2	(0)
2015–2019	Berliner FC Dynamo	33	(0)
2019–	First Vienna FC	6	(0)
- * Club domestic league appearances and goals as of 21:50, 4 June 2016 (UTC)

Bernhard Hendl (born 9 August 1992) is an Austrian football goalkeeper who plays for First Vienna FC. He made his professional debut for SSV Jahn Regensburg on 26 October 2013 in a 3. Liga match against FC Rot-Weiß Erfurt.
