= Abdul Fatah Haqqani =

Afghan prisoner

Abdul Fatah Haqqani عبدالفتاح حقاني
- Died: April 19, 2011
- Citizenship: Afghanistan
- Detained at: Bagram
- Charge: extrajudicial detention
- Status: released, then KIA

Abdul Fatah Haqqani (Pashto: عبدالفتاح حقاني; died April 19, 2011) was a citizen of Afghanistan who was held in the Bagram Internment Facility, and was subsequently killed by US forces.

He was killed on April 19, 2011, by a precision air strike in Burkah district, Baghlan Province. The US claimed he commanded both Taliban forces, and elements of the Islamic Movement of Uzbekistan.
