= Al-Fatat SC =

Women's sports club in Kuwait

- Full name: Al-Fatat Sports Club (نادي الفتات الرياضي)
- Founded: 1975; 50 years ago
- Chairman: Shaikha Al-Sabah
- League: Kuwaiti Women's League
Home colours	Away colours

Al-Fatat Sports Club is a women's sports organisation in Kuwait, founded in 1975. It fields teams in several sports, and it was one of the founding members of the Kuwaiti Women's League football tournament in 2017.
