= Tim Erfen =

German footballer (born 1982)

Personal information
- Date of birth: 22 October 1982 (age 44)
- Place of birth: Mönchengladbach, West Germany
- Height: 1.85 m (6 ft 1 in)
- Position: Midfielder

Youth career
- 1. FC Mönchengladbach
- Borussia Mönchengladbach
- –2001: Rheydter SV

Senior career*
Years	Team	Apps	(Gls)
2001–2002	Rheydter SV	27	(0)
2002–2003	VfL Bochum II	2	(0)
2003–2005	MSV Duisburg II	30	(3)
2005–2006	Carl Zeiss Jena	10	(1)
2006–2007	Rot Weiss Ahlen	33	(1)
2007–2008	Rot-Weiss Essen	23	(1)
2008–2009	Wuppertaler SV	12	(0)
2010–2011	Jahn Regensburg	40	(2)
2012–2013	Jahn Regensburg	21	(0)
- * Club domestic league appearances and goals

Tim Erfen (born 22 October 1982) is a German former professional footballer who played as a midfielder.

== Career ==
Erfen was born in Mönchengladbach. He made his professional debut for Wuppertaler SV Borussia during the sixth round of fixtures of the 2008–09 3. Liga season in a 4–2 home loss to Wacker Burghausen.

Until 2012, he played for SSV Jahn Regensburg in the 2. Bundesliga.
