= Fatah Kandi =

Village in West Azerbaijan, Iran

Fatah Kandi فتاح كندي
- Village
- Location within Iran
- Coordinates: 39°17′37″N 44°56′12″E
- Country: Iran
- Province: West Azerbaijan
- County: Poldasht
- Bakhsh: Central
- Rural District: Zangebar

Population (2006)
  - Total: 255
- Time zone: UTC+3:30 (IRST)
  - Summer (DST): UTC+4:30 (IRDT)

Fatah Kandi (Persian: فتاح كندي, also Romanized as Fatāḩ Kandī and Fattāḩ Kandī) is a village in Zangebar Rural District, in the Central District of Poldasht County, West Azerbaijan Province, Iran. At the 2006 census, its population was 255, in 61 families.
