= Patrick Haag =

German footballer

Personal information
- Date of birth: 9 March 1990 (age 36)
- Place of birth: Ludwigshafen, West Germany
- Height: 1.81 m (5 ft 11 1/2 in)
- Position: Midfielder

Team information
- Current team: TuS Mechtersheim

Youth career
- –2008: 1899 Hoffenheim

Senior career*
Years	Team	Apps	(Gls)
2008–2009	Karlsruher SC II	1	(0)
2009–2010	Waldhof Mannheim	20	(2)
2010–2012	Karlsruher SC II	57	(9)
2012–2014	Jahn Regensburg	43	(2)
2015–2016	Waldhof Mannheim	28	(1)
2016–2017	Arminia Ludwigshafen	14	(3)
2018–2019	FC 08 Villingen	23	(0)
2019–2020	FC 08 Villingen II	12	(0)
2020–2021	VfR Mannheim	6	(0)
2021–	TuS Mechtersheim	0	(0)
- * Club domestic league appearances and goals as of 11 February 2021

Patrick Haag (born 9 March 1990) is a German footballer who plays for TuS Mechtersheim.
