= Fatih Porikli =

Fatih Porikli is an engineer at Mitsubishi Electric Research Laboratories in Cambridge, Massachusetts. He was named a Fellow of the Institute of Electrical and Electronics Engineers (IEEE) in 2014 for his contributions to computer vision and video surveillance. Porikli is currently working as a Chief Scientist at Global Technologies Lab at Huawei, and as a professor at Australian National University.

He is affiliated with Fethullah Gulen affiliated organizations in the United States.
