= Salwa Alsabah SC =

Kuwaiti football club

- Full name: Salwa Alsabah Sporting Club
- Nickname: The blues
- Founded: 2009; 17 years ago
- League: Kuwaiti Women's League
Home colours	Away colours

Salwa Alsabah Sport Club is a Kuwaiti football organization. It was founded in 2009 and was at first dedicated to women athletes. It joined the Kuwaiti Women's League in 2017 as an official competing club.

== See also ==
- Kuwaiti Women's League
- VIVA Premier League
