= Fath ol Jalil =

Fath ol Jalil فتح الجليل
- Village
- Location within Iran
- Coordinates: 27°23′12″N 56°26′20″E
- Country: Iran
- Province: Hormozgan
- County: Bandar Abbas
- Bakhsh: Qaleh Qazi
- Rural District: Sarkhun

Population (2006)
  - Total: 216
- Time zone: UTC+3:30 (IRST)
  - Summer (DST): UTC+4:30 (IRDT)

Fath ol Jalil (Persian: فتح الجليل, also Romanized as Fatḥ ol Jalīl; also known as Fatḥoljalīl) is a village in Sarkhun Rural District, Qaleh Qazi District, Bandar Abbas County, Hormozgan Province, Iran. At the 2006 census, its population was 216, in 48 families.
