= Fatih Gul =

Turkish physician

Fatih Mehmet Gul is a Turkish physician, author, healthcare executive, podcast show host and expert in digital health and hospital management. He is currently the Chief Executive Officer of The View Hospital in Doha, Qatar, an institution affiliated with Cedars-Sinai Medical Center. He is also Honorary Professor at University College London’s Global Business School for Health.

== Early life and education ==
Fatih studied medicine at Erciyes University in Turkey, where he completed his clinical rotations and volunteered in emergency and intensive care services. His early exposure to acute care inspired his interest in systems and patient management. He later pursued executive education at Yeditepe University, Cornell University and Harvard Business School, specializing in healthcare leadership.

== Career ==
From June 2003 to November 2004, Fatih began his career at Marm Assistance, managing travel-insurance patient care and clinic operations for BP oil and gas company in Baku, Tbilisi, and Ankara. Between December 2004 and October 2008, he joined Abdul Latif Jameel, where he coordinated healthcare programs and CSR projects. He subsequently became Business Development Manager (MENA) at Acibadem Healthcare Group.

From November 2009 to April 2013, Fatih served as Country Manager for Healthcare and Social Programs at ALJ Co. In February 2013, he received the Outstanding Contribution for CSR Practices Award in the GCC from World CSR Day.

In May 2013, he founded DRFAMEG Healthcare & Consultancy Ltd, offering management consultancy services to hospitals and healthcare companies in the Middle East. He served as Managing Partner until April 2015.

From May 2015 to October 2020, Fatih was Executive Director at Dr. Soliman Fakeeh Hospital in Jeddah. From May 2017 to June 2023, he was Chief Executive Officer of Fakeeh University Hospital in Dubai, overseeing its commissioning as the first teaching hospital in Dubai. Under his leadership, the hospital achieved Joint Commission International (JCI) accreditation within its first year. Fatih was listed by Becker’s Healthcare at 101 Academic Medical Center CEOs to Know.

From August 2023 to September 2024, he returned as Chief Executive Officer of Dr. Soliman Fakeeh Hospital in Jeddah.

In April 2022, Fatih was listed among Forbes’ Top 50 Healthcare Leaders. In December of the same year, he received a Lifetime Achievement Award from the World Sustainable Business Forum. In March 2023, Fatih was again included in Forbes’ Top 100 Healthcare Leaders.

In August 2024, Newsweek named Fatih a Top Global Hospital CEO. In October 2024, he became Chief Executive Officer of The View Hospital in Doha, affiliated with Cedars-Sinai. In January 2025, he was appointed Honorary Professor at the UCL Global Business School for Health.
