= Denis Weidlich =

Ghanaian-German footballer (born 1986)

Personal information
- Full name: Denis-Danso Weidlich
- Date of birth: 8 July 1986 (age 40)
- Place of birth: Hamburg, West Germany
- Height: 1.85 m (6 ft 1 in)
- Position: Centre back

Youth career
- SC Urania
- Vorwärts-Wacker Billstedt
- –2001: Hamburger SV
- 2001–2003: London Football Academy
- 2003–2006: Southall

Senior career*
Years	Team	Apps	(Gls)
2006–2008	SV Wilhelmshaven	13	(0)
2008–2010	SV Babelsberg 03	55	(0)
2010–2012	Rot-Weiß Erfurt	67	(6)
2012–2013	Jahn Regensburg	22	(1)
2013–2015	Hansa Rostock	67	(4)
2015–2016	Holstein Kiel	29	(0)
2016–2017	Maritzburg United	39	(0)
2018–2019	Bidvest Wits	8	(0)
2019	Schwarz-Weiß Rehden	7	(0)
2022	CFC Hertha 06	16	(0)
Total		323	(11)
- * Club domestic league appearances and goals

Denis-Danso Weidlich (born 8 July 1986) is a Ghanaian-German former professional footballer who played as a centre back.

== Career ==
In June 2016, Weidlich was released by Holstein Kiel after one season with the club. He was a starter, making 32 appearances.

In summer 2016, Weidlich moved to South Africa, joining Maritzburg United. Since 2018 he is playing for Bidvest Wits.
