= Fateh (name) =

Fateh (Arabic: فَتْح) is an Arabic name and surname that means "open, begin, start, commence". Its other version is Fatah.

In Turkish, Fatih is an originally Arabic name for boys that means “conqueror”, “initiator”, “originator”. It is the title of Sultan Mehmed II, the Ottoman ruler who conquered Constantinople and ended the Eastern Roman Empire.

Notable people with the name include:

== Given name ==
- Fateh Daud, Ismaili Shi'a ruler of Multan
- Fateh Naseeb Khan (1890–1933), Commander-in-chief of Alwar State Forces
- Ustad Nusrat Fateh Ali Khan (1948–1997), Pakistani musician, often regarded as one of the greatest voices recorded
- Fateh Kamel (born 1961), Algerian-Canadian, terrorism supporter for plotting attacks against French targets
- Fateh Shah, king of Garhwal, a small kingdom in North India, from 1684 to 1716
- Fateh Singh (1699-1704/05), 4th & youngest son of Guru Gobind Singh, Sikh martyr
- Rahat Fateh Ali Khan (born 1974), Pakistani singer
- Fateh Doe (born 1989), Indo-Canadian rapper, singer and songwriter
- Fateh Khan Barakzai (1777–1818), 19th century Afghan Vizier and Barakzai tribal leader

== Surname ==
- Abul Fateh (1924–2010), Bangladeshi diplomat
- Omar Fateh (born 1990), American politician

== See also ==
- Fatih (name)
