= Al-Fath (magazine) =

Islamist magazine in Egypt (1926–1948)

- Editor-in-chief: Muhib Al Din Al Katib
- Former editors: Abdel Baqi Sorour
- Categories: Political magazine; Islamist magazine
- Frequency: Weekly
- Publisher: Salafi Press House
- Founded: 1926
- First issue: 10 June 1926
- Final issue: 1948
- Country: Egypt
- Based in: Cairo
- Language: Arabic

Al Fath (Arabic: The Victory) was a weekly political magazine which existed between 1926 and 1948 in Cairo, Egypt. The magazine is known for its cofounder and editor Muhib Al Din Al Khatib and for its role in introducing Hasan Al Banna, founder of the Muslim Brotherhood, to the Egyptian political life. It called itself as the mirror of the Islamic world.

== History and profile ==
Al Fath was established by a group of Islamists, including Muhib Al Din Al Katib, Ahmed Taymour Pasha, Abu Bakr Yahya Pasha, Abdul Rahman Qaraa, Muhammad Al Khidr Hussein and Ali Jalal Al Husseini. Of them Ahmed Taymour Pasha also provided financial support to the magazine of which the first issue appeared on 10 June 1926. Its publisher was the Salafi Press House founded and headed by Muhib Al Din Al Katib in Cairo. The first editor-in-chief was Abdel Baqi Sorour, an Al Azhar ulema. Later Muhib Al Din Al Katib replaced him in the post.

Al Fath folded in 1948.

== Content ==
The goals of Al Fath were to provide news and views about the Muslim world, to describe the good dimensions of Islam and to refute the accusations against Islam. The magazine became a significant media outlet for Islamic modernist and pan-Arab thought. It was one of the Egyptian publications which reported the establishment of the Young Muslim Men's Association, precursor of the Muslim Brotherhood, in 1928. In addition, the magazine was the propagandist of the group until October 1929 when the group launched its own publication entitled Majallat Al Shubban Al Muslimin (Arabic: Young Muslim Men’s Magazine). In the 1930s Al Fath attacked the Christian missionary organizations which it represented as threats to the faith and security of Egyptians. From 1931 the magazine began to publicize the Muslim Brotherhood through the publication of small notices. The role of the magazine was expanded to function as the mouthpiece of Salafi modernist movement following the closure of Rashid Rida's magazine Al Manar in 1936. With this new role the circulation of Al Fath increased in the Arab countries. However, Al Fath's approach towards Salafism was much more populist in contrast to that of Al Manar. Al Fath also dealt with the events related to the Muslims living in non-Arab or Muslim countries such as India and Europe. Partly due to its wide coverage it had readers in London.

== Contributors ==
Hasan Al Banna published his early fifteen articles in the magazine in the period 1928–1930 before the start of the Brotherhood's own publications. In these articles some of which were published on the front page of the magazine he presented his vision about the Muslim Brotherhood movement. These publications contributed to his recognition as a leader by the Muslim world. The other major contributors of Al Fath included Ahmed Muhammad Shakir, Mahmoud Muhammad Shakir, Shakib Arslan, Mustafa Sadiq Al Rafi’i, Mustafa Sabri, Ali Al Tantawi, Zaki Kiram and Taqi Al Din Al Hilali some of whom were living in Europe. These writers attacked the ideas of Taha Hussein who criticized pre-Islamic poetry and adopted a Western-origin views. The other political and literary figures who were harshly criticized by the Al Fath contributors were Ahmed Lutfi Al Sayed, Salama Moussa, Tawfiq Al Hakim, Hussein Fawzy, Michel Aflaq, Mahmoud Azmy and Ismail Adham. In addition, Al Fath clashed with the editors of Nur Al Islam which was one of the media outlets of Al Azhar.

The contributors of Al Fath were not limited to Arabs in that it also had a Chinese Muslim editor, Badr Al Din Hai Weiliang, whose articles were published until 1937.
