= Shaikha Al-Sabah =

Kuwaiti yoga practitioner

- Occupation: Yoga practitioner
- Years active: 2001–present
- Organization: Daratma
- Known for: Promoting yoga education in Kuwait
- Title: Founder of Daratma
- Awards: Padma Shri (2025)

Shaikha Ali Al-Jaber Al-Sabah is a Kuwaiti yoga practitioner and the founder of Daratma, a yoga education center in Kuwait. In 2025, she became the first Kuwaiti national to receive India's Padma Shri award, conferred for her contributions to the field of yoga.

== Career ==
=== Yoga Education ===
She began practicing yoga in 2001 and established Daratma in 2014, Kuwait's first officially licensed yoga studio. The center conducts programs related to yoga education, mindfulness, and wellness. She has been associated with a youth yoga initiative called Shems, which promotes yoga among children and adolescents.

=== Other initiatives ===
In 2021, she launched a charitable initiative, Yomnak lil Yaman, aimed at supporting Yemeni refugees and internally displaced individuals. During the COVID-19 pandemic, she was involved in distributing educational supplies to underprivileged children in Kuwait.

She has also organised international wellness events, including Reiki Jin Kei Do and consciousness training sessions at the Monroe Institute in the United States.

In December 2024. Indian Prime Minister Narendra Modi met with Al-Sabah during his visit to Kuwait and acknowledged her contributions to promoting yoga, particularly among youth.

== Awards and recognition ==
On 25 January 2025, Al-Sabah received the Padma Shri, India's fourth-highest civilian award, in recognition of her work in the field of yoga. she was one of eight international recipients that year.
