= Sebastian Hofmann =

German footballer (born 1983)

Personal information
- Date of birth: 12 September 1983 (age 43)
- Place of birth: Sinsheim, West Germany
- Height: 1.86 m (6 ft 1 in)
- Position: Forward

Youth career
- SV Rohrbach
- SV Sinsheim
- SV Sandhausen
- –2002: Karlsruher SC
- 2002–2003: 1899 Hoffenheim

Senior career*
Years	Team	Apps	(Gls)
2003–2006	1899 Hoffenheim II	35	(3)
2003–2006	1899 Hoffenheim	17	(4)
2006–2010	VfB Stuttgart II	71	(18)
2010–2011	FC Ingolstadt 04	14	(3)
2011–2013	Jahn Regensburg	11	(1)
2013–2015	FC Nöttingen		
- * Club domestic league appearances and goals

Sebastian Hofmann (born 12 September 1983) is a former professional footballer who played as a forward who plays for GSV Maichingen.

== Career ==
Hofmann was born in Sinsheim. He made his debut at TSG 1899 Hoffenheim in 2003 in the Regionalliga Süd.

In July 2006, he moved to VfB Stuttgart II on a free transfer. He made his debut at VfB Stuttgart II in a 0–0 draw against TSV 1860 München II in the 2006–07 season and scored his first goal against FC Ingolstadt 04. In the 2006–07 season he played 11 games and scored two goals. In the 2007–08 season, Hofmann played 24 games and scored nine goals. In the 2008–09 season he played 23 games and scored six goals. On 5 June 2009, he extended his contract at VfB until the end of June 2011. As he did not succeed in getting a place in Stuttgart's first team, he joined FC Ingolstadt in June 2010.
