= Rebwar Fatah =

Rebwar Fatah is a contemporary Kurdish writer and journalist. He runs the Kurdish news and commentary web site KurdishMedia.com. He is one of the influential Kurdish advocates in the diaspora. His ideas and proposals contributed to the understanding of the Middle East, in particular Kurdistan, Iraq, Iran, Syria and Turkey.

== Life ==
He was born in Sulaimaniya city in Iraqi Kurdistan. His first article in Kurdish in a national Iraqi paper (Hawkari) appeared in 1972. He moved to live in exile in London in 1982. He has extensively contributed to the understanding of the Middle Eastern issues, including West's foreign policy. He has written numerous articles, given talks and interviews, in both Kurdish and English, on the socio-political situation of the Middle East as a Middle Eastern specialist.

He holds BSc, MSc and PhD degrees from London and University College London (UCL) respectively in Physics, Solid State Physics and in optical transmissions for sensing applications. He worked in executive and commercial positions for British and international cooperatives and institutions for over 20 years. He worked for University of London and University College London (1983–1989); British Telecom (1989–97); Fujitsu (1997–2000); Nortel Networks (2000–01); 186k (2001–02). He has published over 100 papers as part of his professional work.

== Positions ==
- Foundering member and the director of KurdishMedia.com, 1998–2012
- Regular contributor to the Australian SBS Kurdish Radio, Sydney, 2000–2010
- Contributing writer to Soma Diget, February 2006–2007
- Regular contributor to the BBC London Live radio, 2001–02
- Columnist in a cultural Australian-Kurdish weekly newspaper, Chira (The Lamp), 1998
- Founding member and media coordinator of a Kurdish language Internet site Kurdish Language Technology Initiative (Kurd_lal) 1996–2000
- Founding member and editor-in-chief of an English newsletter Hawkar, London, 1992–1994
- Foundering member, columnist and editor-in-chief of the cultural Kurdish newsletter, Jîni Niwê (New life), London, 1990s
- Member of the executive committee of the British Refugee Council for three years in the 1990s
