= Francky Sembolo =

Congolese footballer

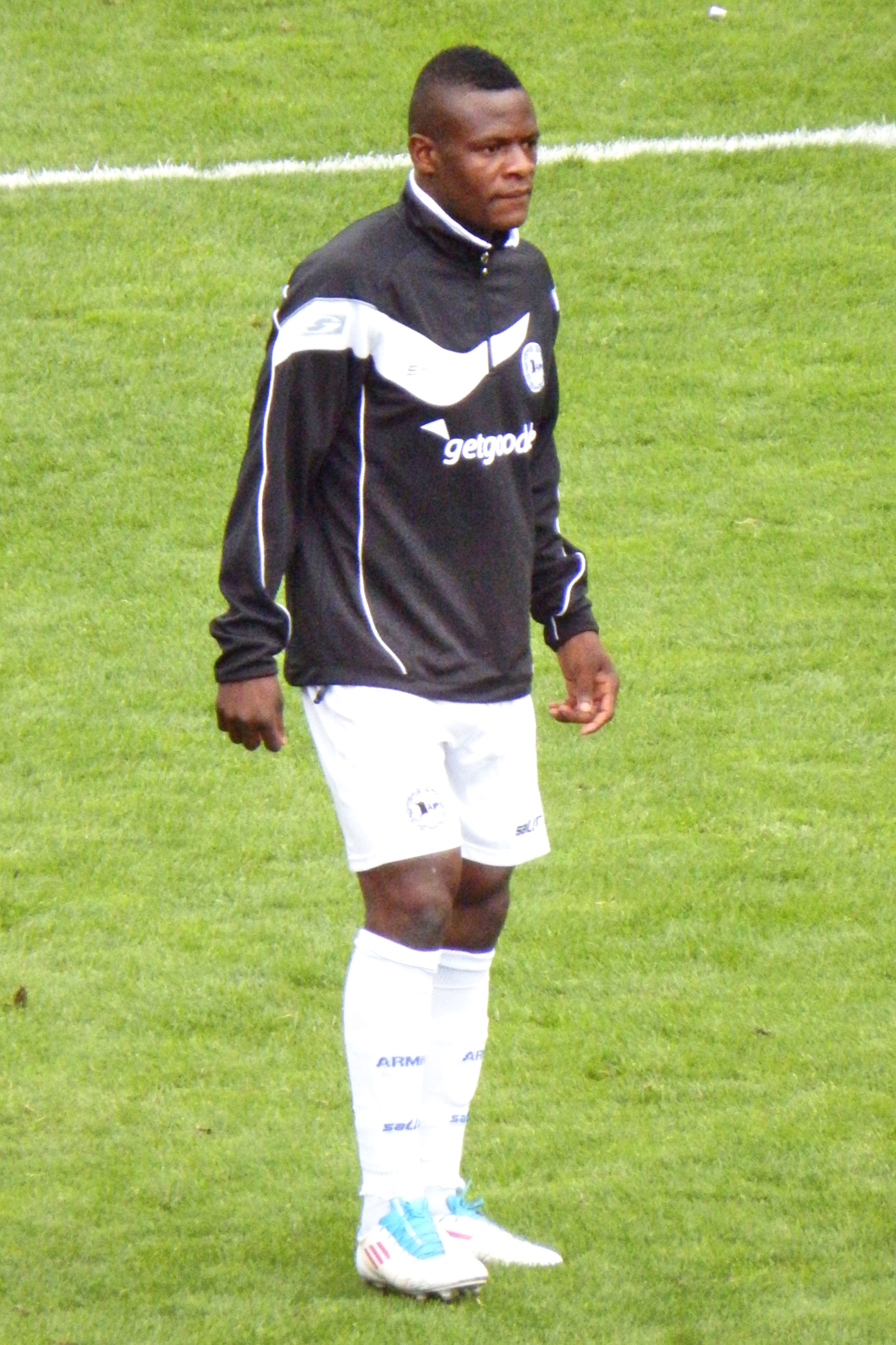
- Sembolo with Arminia Bielefeld in 2013

Personal information
- Date of birth: 9 August 1985 (age 41)
- Place of birth: Nkayi, Republic of the Congo
- Height: 1.82 m (6 ft 0 in)
- Position: Striker

Team information
- Current team: BSV Schwarz-Weiß Rehden
- Number: 12

Senior career*
Years	Team	Apps	(Gls)
2005	Saint Michel d'Ouenzé		
2005–2006	Canon Yaoundé		
2006–2009	FC Oberneuland	86	(24)
2009–2011	Holstein Kiel	34	(3)
2011–2012	SV Wilhelmshaven	27	(18)
2012–2013	Jahn Regensburg	32	(8)
2013–2014	Arminia Bielefeld	8	(0)
2014	→ Hallescher FC (loan)	14	(8)
2014–2016	VfL Osnabrück II	8	(1)
2014–2016	VfL Osnabrück	34	(2)
2016	Berliner AK 07	11	(1)
2017	SV Meppen	13	(1)
2017–2019	BSV Schwarz-Weiß Rehden	37	(10)
2019	FC Teutonia Ottensen	11	(1)

International career^{‡}
2005–2011	Congo	7	(2)
- * Club domestic league appearances and goals as of 1 July 2019 ‡ National team caps and goals as of 19:48, 30 December 2014 (UTC)

Francky Sembolo (born 9 August 1985) is a Congolese professional footballer who plays as a striker. Between 2005 and 2006 he made seven appearances for the Congo national team, scoring twice. Since 2006 he has been signed to German football clubs only.

== Club career ==
Sembolo started his career with Saint Michel d'Ouenzé and Canon Yaoundé before moving to Germany in 2006. Since then he has played for FC Oberneuland, Holstein Kiel, SV Wilhelmshaven, SSV Jahn Regensburg, Arminia Bielefeld, Hallescher FC, VfL Osnabrück and currently Berliner AK 07.

== International career ==
Sembolo holds German citizenship, but played internationally for Congo, his country of birth. He made his international debut in 2005, and has appeared in FIFA World Cup qualifying matches. During the 2012 Africa Cup of Nations qualification, Sembolo scored twice in a 3–1 win against Swaziland.
