= Sinān ibn al-Fatḥ =

Sinān ibn al-Fatḥ was an Arab mathematician from Ḥarrān, who probably lived in the first half of the 10th century.

Ibn an-Nadīm lists the following works of his:

1. Kitāb at-Taḫt fi l-ḥisāb al-hindī ("Book of the Table on the Indian Calculation")
2. Kitāb al-Ğamʿ wa-t-tafrīq ("Book of Addition and Subtraction")
3. Kitāb Šarḥ al-Ğamʿ wa-t-tafrīq ("Commentary on the Book of Addition and Subtraction")
4. Kitāb Ḥisāb al-mukaʿʿabāt ("Book on the Cubic Calculation")
5. Kitāb Šarḥ al-ğabr wa-l-muqābala li-l-Ḫwārizmī ("Commentary on the Book of Balancing and Restoration by al-Ḫwārizmī")
