= Fatih Aydın =

Turkish footballer (born 1995)

Nuri Fatih Aydın
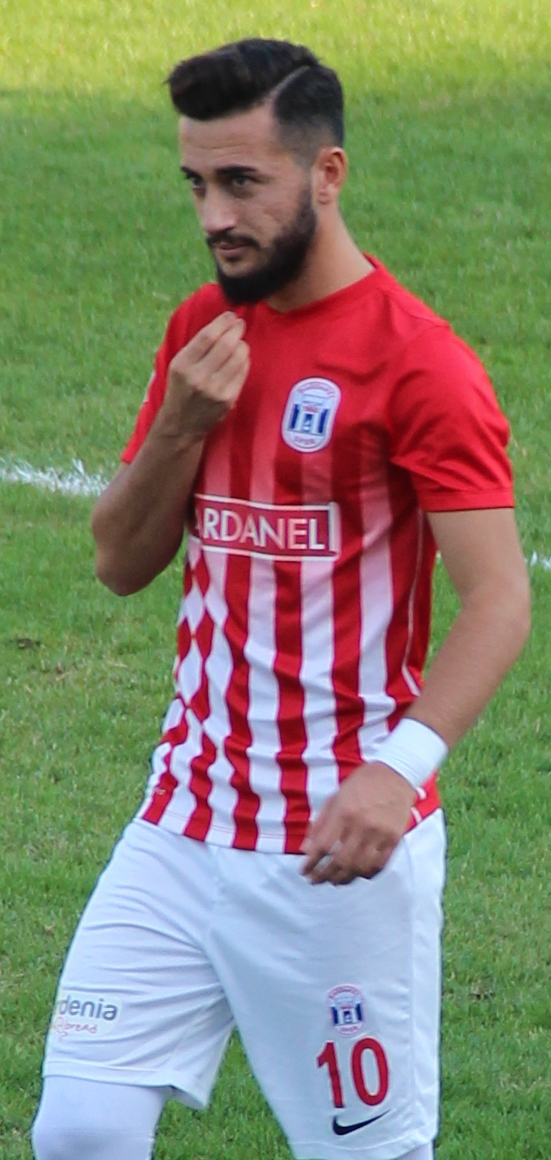
- Nuri Fatih Aydın in 2011

Personal information
- Date of birth: 1 January 1995 (age 31)
- Place of birth: Konya, Turkey
- Height: 1.71 m (5 ft 7 in)
- Position: Midfielder

Senior career*
Years	Team	Apps	(Gls)
2010–2015	Eskişehirspor	3	(0)
2013	→ Bozüyükspor (loan)	16	(1)
2014	→ Dardanelspor (loan)	14	(3)
2014–2015	→ Dardanelspor (loan)	33	(3)
2015–2018	Dardanelspor	70	(9)
2018–2025	Yeni Malatyaspor	15	(2)
2018	→ Kastamonuspor 1966 (loan)	6	(2)
2018–2019	→ Sarıyer (loan)	33	(5)
2019–2021	→ Sakaryaspor (loan)	45	(5)
2023	→ Karşıyaka (loan)	3	(0)
2023–2024	→ Anadolu Üniversitesi (loan)	6	(0)
2024	→ Diyarbekirspor (loan)	9	(0)
2025	Silifke Belediyespor	9	(2)

International career
2011	Turkey U16	8	(0)
2011	Turkey U17	4	(0)
2012–2013	Turkey U18	6	(0)
Medal record
26 April 2025
- * Club domestic league appearances and goals

Nuri Fatih Aydın (born 1 January 1995) is a Turkish footballer who plays as a midfielder. He made his Süper Lig debut on 6 May 2011.
