= Yusuf Kasal =

German-Turkish footballer

Personal information
- Full name: Yusuf Emre Kasal
- Date of birth: 20 May 1988 (age 38)
- Place of birth: Schweinfurt, West Germany
- Height: 1.85 m (6 ft 1 in)
- Position: Midfielder

Team information
- Current team: TuS Mechtersheim
- Number: 5

Youth career
- –2003: 1. FC Schweinfurt 05
- 2004–2007: 1. FC Nürnberg

Senior career*
Years	Team	Apps	(Gls)
2007–2008	Würzburger FV	12	(1)
2008–2010	Körfez	8	(0)
2010	→ Kartal BSK (loan)	5	(0)
2011	VfR Mannheim		
2011–2012	SSV Jahn Regensburg	11	(0)
2012–2014	Denizlispor	10	(0)
2014	SV Waldhof Mannheim	11	(0)
2014–2015	Gümüşhanespor	30	(2)
2015–2016	Bugsaşspor	22	(1)
2016–2019	Kahramanmaraşspor	76	(9)
2020	BAKspor	8	(0)
2020–2022	Afjet Afyonspor	34	(1)
2022–	TuS Mechtersheim	3	(0)
- * Club domestic league appearances and goals as of 12 November 2022

Yusuf Emre Kasal (born 20 May 1988) is a German-Turkish professional footballer who plays for TuS Mechtersheim.

== Club career ==
Kasal made his professional debut for SSV Jahn Regensburg during the second round of fixtures of the 2011–12 3. Liga season away to SV Werder Bremen II.
