= Marius Müller (footballer, born 1990) =

German footballer (born 1990)

Personal information
- Date of birth: 5 October 1990 (age 36)
- Place of birth: Heppenheim, Germany
- Height: 1.91 m (6 ft 3 in)
- Position: Midfielder

Youth career
- SV Steinbach
- –2009: Borussia Fulda

Senior career*
Years	Team	Apps	(Gls)
2008–2009	Borussia Fulda	3	(0)
2009–2010	Hünfelder SV	27	(5)
2010–2011	Eintracht Frankfurt II	10	(0)
2011–2012	FSV Frankfurt II	25	(7)
2012–2014	Jahn Regensburg	10	(0)
2012–2014	Jahn Regensburg II	11	(5)
2013	→ SV Steinbach (loan)	9	(2)
2014–2017	Borussia Fulda	54	(21)
2017	SV Steinbach	4	(1)
- * Club domestic league appearances and goals as of 24 August 2017

Marius Müller (born 15 October 1990) is a German football midfielder

Müller started playing for the youth teams of SV Steinbach and Borussia Fulda. In 2009, he moved to Hünfelder SV who played in the Hessenliga. After one season, he moved to the second team of Eintracht Frankfurt, playing in the Regionalliga Süd. Only one year later, he transferred to the second team of city rivals FSV Frankfurt. In summer 2012, he joined SSV Jahn Regensburg who were newly promoted to the 2. Bundesliga. In the first half of the season he did not get any playing time for the first team and was loaned out for the rest of the season to SV Steinbach. After only one season, Regensburg was relegated to the 3. Liga and Müller made several appearances for the first team.
