= Al-Fattāḥ =

One of the names of God in Islam

al-Fattāḥ (Arabic: الفتاح "the opener") is one of the names of Allah in Islam. It is mentioned in the Qur'ān and Sunnah, amongst other places.

== Linguistic meaning ==
The word for "Fattah" comes from the root word fataha (فتاحة). Fataha means to open, grant, explain, disclose, to make victorious or let out. The name of the first surah of the Quran, al-Fatiha, is based on this same root, and is generally translated as The Opener, or The Opening. The Arabic word miftâhî, translated as key, means that which opens or unlocks, is also based on this same root.

== Deeper meaning ==
In his book, "al-Maqsad al-Asna fi Sharah Asma' Allahu al-Husna" (a.k.a. The best means in explaining Allah's Beautiful Names), Imam al-Ghazali translates al-Fattah as "He Who Opens all things". He goes on to explain that "He is the One by Whose Concern everything that is closed is opened, and (The One) by Whose guidance everything that is obscure is made manifest. At times He causes kingdoms to be opened (i.e, conquered) for His prophets, and He takes them out of the hands of His enemies..." Imam al-Ghazzali then quotes a few verses from the Quran to elaborate on this meaning. For example, he uses verse 48:1, "Lo! We have given thee, (O Muhammad), a signal victory (literally, opening)..." Imam al-Ghazzali chose to say that Allah causes kingdoms to be opened (i.e., conquered) for His prophets. The first ayat of Surah An-Nasr states: "When there comes the Help of Allah and the 'fat-ha'", which some have translated into victory. This Surah was revealed referring to the Conquest of Mecca when the pagans of Mecca surrendered to the Islamic Prophet Muhammad, which proved to be a great victory for Islam.

== Occurrence in the Quran ==
Allah regards Himself as "al-Fattah" in verse 34:26 of the Quran. He paired this attribute with "al-Alim", The All Knowing.

The verb of fataha is also used in various places in the Quran. One example, cited by Imam al-Ghazzali, is in verse 35:2 which states: "That which Allah Openeth unto mankind of Mercy none can withhold it." Imam al-Ghazzali says: "At times He lifts the screen from the hearts of His friends and He opens to them the gates to the kingdom of His heaven and the Beauty of His Grandeur."
