= 2012–13 SV Sandhausen season =

SV Sandhausen
2012–13 season
- Manager: Alois Schwartz
- Stadium: Hardtwaldstadion, Sandhausen, Germany
- 2.Bundesliga: 2nd
- DFB-Pokal: Second round

The 2012–13 SV Sandhausen season is the 98th season in the club's football history. In 2012–13 the club played in the 2. Bundesliga, the second tier of German football. It was the clubs first-ever season in this league, having won promotion from the 3. Liga in 2011–12.

== Review and events ==
The club also took part in the 2012–13 edition of the DFB-Pokal, the German Cup, where it reached the second round and lost to Bundesliga side Schalke 04.

== Matches ==
=== Legend ===
Win Draw Loss Postponed

=== Friendly matches ===
SV Sandhausen	1–4	Hessen Kassel
Nico Klotz		Goal

=== 2. Bundesliga ===
5 August 2012 1	SV Sandhausen	1–1	FSV Frankfurt	Sandhausen
13:30 CEST (UTC+02:00)	Tüting (yellow card) 20', (goal) 45'	Report (in German)	Verhoek 40'	Stadium: Hardtwaldstadion; Attendance: 4,900; Referee: Christian Dietz (Kronach)

10 August 2012 2	1. FC Köln	1–0	SV Sandhausen	Köln
18:00 CEST (UTC+02:00)	Bröker 63' (pen.)	Report (in German)	Tüting (yellow card) 88'; Dorn 89'	Stadium: RheinEnergieStadion; Attendance: 22,900; Referee: Markus Wingenbach (Mainz)

24 August 2012 3	SV Sandhausen	2–0	Union Berlin	Sandhausen
18:00 CEST (UTC+02:00)	Löning 42'; Fießer 71'	Report (in German)	Mattuschka (yellow card) 79'; Karl (yellow card) 90'	Stadium: Hardtwaldstadion; Attendance: 3,500; Referee: Bibiana Steinhaus (Hannover)

1 September 2012 4	FC St. Pauli	2–1	SV Sandhausen	St. Pauli
13:00 CEST (UTC+02:00)	Bartels 71'; Ebbers 76'	Report (in German)	Morena (yellow card) 39'; Achenbach (yellow card) 78'; Pischorn 83'	Stadium: Millerntor-Stadion; Attendance: 21,045; Referee: Felix Brych (Munich)

15 September 2012 5	SV Sandhausen	1–1	Dynamo Dresden	Sandhausen
13:00 CEST (UTC+02:00)	Löning 32'; Falkenberg (yellow card) 61'	Report (in German)	Losilla (yellow card) 37', (goal) 55'	Stadium: Hardtwaldstadion; Attendance: 6,400; Referee: Benjamin Cortus (Röthenbach an der Pegnitz)

22 September 2012 6	SC Paderborn	3–0	SV Sandhausen	Paderborn
13:00 CEST (UTC+02:00)	Kempe 49', 82'; Hofmann 74'; Zeitz (yellow card) 90'	Report (in German)	Kandziora (yellow card) 17'; Fießer (yellow card) 38'	Stadium: Benteler Arena; Attendance: 6,278; Referee: Marcel Unger (Halle)

25 September 2012 7	SV Sandhausen	1–2	Jahn Regensburg	Sandhausen
17:30 CEST (UTC+02:00)	Pischorn 37'; Falkenberg (yellow card) 58'; Onuegbu (yellow card) 90'	Report (in German)	Müller 45'; Laurito (yellow card) 45'; Kamavuaka (yellow card) 67'; Nachreiner (yellow card) 73'; Wießmeier 90'	Stadium: Hardtwaldstadion; Attendance: 2,400; Referee: Robert Kampka (Mainz)

29 September 2012 8	1860 Munich	4–0	SV Sandhausen	Munich
13:00 CEST (UTC+02:00)	Vallori (yellow card) 5'; Halfar 10'; Stoppelkamp 20'; Bierofka 24'; Lauth 46'	Report (in German)		Stadium: Allianz Arena; Attendance: 19,100; Referee: Tobias Welz (Wiesbaden)

7 October 2012 9	SV Sandhausen	1–0	VfR Aalen	Sandhausen
13:30 CEST (UTC+02:00)	Onuegbu 19'; Tüting (yellow card) 39'; Glibo (yellow card) 89'	Report (in German)	Grech (yellow card) 8'	Stadium: Hardtwaldstadion; Attendance: 2,800; Referee: Benjamin Brand (Gerolzhofen)

19 October 2012 10	1. FC Kaiserslautern	3–1	SV Sandhausen	Kaiserslautern
18:00 CEST (UTC+02:00)	Idrissou 4', (yellow card) 72'; Zuck (yellow card) 20'; Bunjaku 24'; Zellner (yellow card) 65'; Hajri 90'	Report (in German)	Achenbach 8', (yellow card) 76'; Kittner (yellow card) 11'; Morena (yellow card) 70'; Fießer (yellow card) 75'; Löning (yellow card) 78'	Stadium: Fritz-Walter-Stadion; Attendance: 27,526; Referee: Florian Steuer (Menden)

27 October 2012 11	SV Sandhausen	0–2	MSV Duisburg	Sandhausen
13:00 CET (UTC+01:00)	Fießer (yellow card) 71'; Pischorn (yellow card) 80'	Report (in German)	Brandy 33', 60', (yellow card) 45'	Stadium: Hardtwaldstadion; Attendance: 3,500; Referee: Christian Leicher (Landshut)

2 November 2012 12	Eintracht Braunschweig	2–1	SV Sandhausen	Braunschweig
18:00 CET (UTC+01:00)	Kumbela 45', 50'	Report (in German)	Ischdonat (yellow card) 33'; Löning 62'	Stadium: Eintracht-Stadion; Attendance: 18,900; Referee: Bastian Dankert (Rostock)

9 November 2012 13	SV Sandhausen	1–6	Hertha BSC	Sandhausen
18:00 CET (UTC+01:00)	Langer (red card) 65'; Wooten 75'	Report (in German)	Ramos 28'; Niemeyer 35'; Ronny 68'; Allagui 81'; Ndjeng 89'; Sahar 90'	Stadium: Hardtwaldstadion; Attendance: 8,300; Referee: Christian Diet (Kronach)

18 November 2012 14	VfL Bochum	5–2	SV Sandhausen	Bochum
13:30 CET (UTC+01:00)	Sinkiewicz (yellow card) 11'; Rothenbach (yellow card) 13'; Dedić 20', 44'; Maltritz (yellow card) 31', (goal) 40'; Rzatkowski 51', 71'; Chaftar (yellow card) 82'	report (in German)	Löning 5', 23'; Kandziora (yellow card) 39'	Stadium: Rewirpower Stadion; Attendance: 9,795; Referee: Benjamin Brand (Gerolzhofen)

25 November 2012 15	FC Ingolstadt	1–1	SV Sandhausen	Ingolstadt
13:30 CET (UTC+01:00)	Eigler 19'	Report (in German)	Schulz (yellow card) 16'; Klotz 82'	Stadium: Audi Sportpark; Attendance: 6,547; Referee: Christian Fischer (Hemer)

28 November 2012 16	SV Sandhausen	3–1	Energie Cottbus	Sandhausen
17:30 CET (UTC+01:00)	Wooten 59' (pen.), 66' (pen.); Schulz (yellow card) 78'; Schauerte (yellow card) 88'; Löning 90'	Report (in German)	Möhrle 34'; Brinkmann (yellow card) 35'	Stadium: Hardtwaldstadion; Attendance: 2,650; Referee: Christian Dingert (Lebecksmühle)

1 December 2012 17	Erzgebirge Aue	2–2	SV Sandhausen	Aue
13:00 CET (UTC+01:00)	Hochscheidt 8'; Hensel (yellow card) 36'; Sylvestr (yellow card) 54'; Paulus 80' (pen.); Könnecke (yellow card) 82'	Report (in German)	Löning 39'; Pischorn (yellow card) 47' (red card) 50'; Fießer 62'; Schauerte (yellow card) 68'; Kandziora (yellow card) 88'; Wooten (yellow card) 90'	Stadium: Sparkassen-Erzgebirgsstadion; Attendance: 6,150; Referee: Benjamin Cortus (Röthenbach an der Pegnitz)

7 December 2012 18	FSV Frankfurt	3–1	SV Sandhausen	Frankfurt
18:00 CET (UTC+01:00)	Verhoek 2'; Yun 13'; Kapllani 83'; Teixeira (yellow card) 84'	Report (in German)	Ulm 64'	Stadium: Frankfurter Volksbank Stadion; Attendance: 2,612; Referee: Robert Kempter (Sauldorf)

14 December 2012 19	SV Sandhausen	0–0	1. FC Köln	Sandhausen
18:00 CET (UTC+01:00)	Fießer (yellow card) 36'	Report (in German)	Lehmann (yellow card) 33'; Jajalo (yellow card) 44'; Maroh (yellow card) 87'	Stadium: Hardtwaldstadion; Attendance: 6,200; Referee: Christian Leicher (Landshut)

1 February 2013 20	Union Berlin	3–1	SV Sandhausen	Berlin
18:00 CET (UTC+01:00)	Parensen 6'; Mattuschka 32' (pen.); Özbek 68', (yellow card) 85'	Report (in German)	Ischdonat (yellow card) 65'; Schauerte 90'	Stadium: Stadion An der Alten Försterei; Attendance: 17,532; Referee: Christian Bandurski (Oberhausen)

10 February 2013 21	SV Sandhausen	4–1	FC St. Pauli	Sandhausen
13:30 CET (UTC+01:00)	Löning 3', 39'; Ulm 29' (pen.), (yellow card) 70'; Mäkelä 49'; Achenbach (yellow card) 57'	Report (in German)	Funk (yellow card) 44'; Kringe 74' (pen.)	Stadium: Hardtwaldstadion; Attendance: 7,600; Referee: Benjamin Brand (Gerolzhofen)

17 February 2013 22	Dynamo Dresden	3–1	SV Sandhausen	Dresden
13:30 CET (UTC+01:00)	Kitambala 7'; Müller 71', 75'	Report (in German)	Wooten 57'; Kandziora (red card) 77'; Pischorn (yellow card) 88'	Stadium: Glücksgas Stadion; Attendance: 19,444; Referee: Peter Gagelmann (Bremen)

24 February 2013 23	SV Sandhausen	1–3	SC Paderborn	Sandhausen
13:30 CET (UTC+01:00)	Löning 5'; Wooten (yellow card) 18'; Achenbach (yellow card) 43'; Fießer	Report (in German)	Demme (yellow card) 37'; Sağlik (yellow card) 53'; Brückner 56'; Vrančić 66'; Kachunga (yellow card) 77'; Hofmann 90'	Stadium: Hardtwaldstadion; Attendance: 2,300; Referee: Harm Osmers (Hannover)

1 March 2013 24	Jahn Regensburg	1–3	SV Sandhausen	Regensburg
18:00 CET (UTC+01:00)	Carlinhos (yellow card) 9', (goal) 42'; De Guzman (yellow card) 45'; Laurito (yellow card) 63'	Report (in German)	Olajengbesi 30'; Wooten (yellow card) 33'; Löning 45', (yellow card) 85'; Beichler (yellow card) 77'; Riemann 90'	Stadium: Jahnstadion; Attendance: 6,123; Referee: Jochen Drees (Münster-Sarmsheim)

8 March 2013 25	SV Sandhausen	0–1	1860 Munich	Sandhausen
18:00 CEST (UTC+01:00)	Ulm (yellow card) 37'	Report (in German)	Stahl (yellow card) 23'; Bierofka (yellow card) 26'; Volz (yellow card) 28'; Tomasov 54'	Stadium: Hardtwaldstadion; Attendance: 6,200; Referee: Florian Steuer (Menden)

17 March 2013 26	VfR Aalen	2–2	SV Sandhausen	Aalen
13:30 CET (UTC+01:00)	Lechleiter 30'; Junglas (yellow card) 87'; Abe 90'	Report (in German)	Olajengbesi (yellow card) 23'; Wooten 70'; Mäkelä 82'	Stadium: Scholz-Arena; Attendance: 6,277; Referee: Thorsten Schriever (Dorum)

31 March 2013 27	SV Sandhausen	1–1	1. FC Kaiserslautern	Sandhausen
13:30 CEST (UTC+02:00)	Achenbach (yellow card) 27'; Sippel 67' (o.g.); Pischorn (yellow card) 90'	Report (in German)	Idrissou 18'; Borysiuk (yellow card) 25'	Stadium: Hardtwaldstadion; Attendance: 12,000; Referee: Bastian Dankert (Rostock)

7 April 2013 28	MSV Duisburg	2–1	SV Sandhausen	Duisburg
13:30 CEST (UTC+02:00)	Perthel 31'; Bajić 64' (pen.)	Report (in German)	Fießer 34'; Olajengbesi (yellow card) 40'; Ischdonat (yellow card) 64'	Stadium: Schauinsland-Reisen-Arena; Attendance: 11,354; Referee: Christian Dietz (Kronach)

12 April 2013 29	SV Sandhausen	1–3	Eintracht Braunschweig	Sandhausen
18:00 CEST (UTC+02:00)	Mäkelä 51'; Pischorn (yellow card) 73'; Beichler (yellow card) 82'; Falkenberg (yellow card) 82'	Report (in German)	Kumbela 4', 39'; Kruppke 86'	Stadium: Hardtwaldstadion; Attendance: 6,300; Referee: Christian Bandurski (Oberhausen)

21 April 2013 30	Hertha BSC	1–0	SV Sandhausen	Berlin
13:30 CEST (UTC+02:00)	Lasogga 85'	Report (in German)	Mäkelä (yellow card) 53'; Beichler (yellow card) 65'	Stadium: Olympiastadion; Attendance: 52,135; Referee: Christian Leicher (Landshut)

26 April 2013 31	SV Sandhausen	0–1	VfL Bochum	Sandhausen
18:00 CEST (UTC+02:00)	Falkenberg (yellow card) 37'	Report (in German)	Maltritz 41'	Stadium: Hardtwaldstadion; Attendance: 4,400; Referee: Tobias Christ (Münchweiler)

4 May 2013 32	SV Sandhausen	3–1	FC Ingolstadt	Sandhausen
13:00 CEST (UTC+02:00)	Adler 7'; Fießer (yellow card) 40'; Wooten 58', 83'	Report (in German)	Eigler 26'; Matip (yellow card) 66'; Schäffler (yellow card) 84'	Stadium: Hardtwaldstadion; Attendance: 2,850; Referee: Florian Steuer (Menden)

12 May 2013 33	Energie Cottbus	3–0	SV Sandhausen	Cottbus
13:30 CEST (UTC+02:00)	Bickel 24'; Möhrle (yellow card) 28'; Sanogo 41'; Rivić (yellow card) 77'; Adlung 77'	Report (in German)		Stadium: Stadion der Freundschaft; Attendance: 9,407; Referee: Benjamin Brand (Gerolzhofen)

19 May 2013 34	SV Sandhausen	0–1	Erzgebirge Aue	Sandhausen
13:30 CEST (UTC+02:00)	Danneberg (yellow card) 61'; Schulz (yellow card) 73'; Achenbach (yellow card) 90'	Report (in German)	Fink (yellow card) 23'; Hochscheidt 79'; König (yellow card) 88'	Stadium: Hardtwaldstadion; Attendance: 5,250; Referee: Peter Sippel (Munich)

=== DFB-Pokal ===
20 August 2012	SV Sandhausen	3–0	Energie Cottbus	Sandhausen
18:30	Löning 3'; Schulz 10'; Fießer 90'	Report		Stadium: Hardtwaldstadion; Attendance: 5,000; Referee: Thorsten Kinhöfer (Herne)

30 October 2012	Schalke 04	3–0	SV Sandhausen	Gelsenkirchen
20:30	Afellay 11'; Marica 62'; Huntelaar 79'	Report		Stadium: Veltins-Arena; Attendance: 52,970; Referee: Michael Weiner (Ottenstein)
