= 2013–14 DFB-Pokal =

Tournament details
- Country: Germany
- Teams: 64

Final positions
- Champions: Bayern Munich
- Runner-up: Borussia Dortmund

Tournament statistics
- Matches played: 63
- Goals scored: 193 (3.06 per match)
- Top goal scorer(s): Thomas Müller (8 goals)

The 2013–14 DFB-Pokal was the 71st season of the annual German football cup competition. It began on 2 August 2013 with the first of six rounds and ended on 17 May 2014 with the final at the Olympiastadion in Berlin. Bayern Munich went on to win the competition for the second season running, defeating Borussia Dortmund 2–0 in the final.

The winners would qualify for the group stage of the 2014–15 UEFA Europa League, but as both finalists had already qualified for the 2014–15 UEFA Champions League, the seventh-placed Bundesliga team qualified instead.

== Participating clubs ==
The following 64 teams qualified for the competition:

| Bundesliga the 18 clubs of the 2012–13 season | 2. Bundesliga; the 17 clubs of the 2012–13 season | 3. Liga; the top 4 clubs of the 2012–13 season |
|---|---|---|
| FC Augsburg; SV Werder Bremen; Borussia Dortmund; Fortuna Düsseldorf; Eintracht Frankfurt; SC Freiburg; SpVgg Greuther Fürth; Hamburger SV; Hannover 96; TSG 1899 Hoffenheim; Bayer 04 Leverkusen; 1. FSV Mainz 05; Borussia Mönchengladbach; FC Bayern Munich; 1. FC Nürnberg; FC Schalke 04; VfB Stuttgart; VfL Wolfsburg | VfR Aalen; FC Erzgebirge Aue; 1. FC Union Berlin; VfL Bochum; Eintracht Braunschweig; FC Energie Cottbus; ~~Dynamo Dresden~~ (Note: Dynamo Dresden have been banned from competing after violent behavior from their fans in the 2012–13 DFB-Pokal second round match against Hannover 96.); MSV Duisburg; FSV Frankfurt; Hertha BSC; FC Ingolstadt 04; 1. FC Kaiserslautern; 1. FC Köln; TSV 1860 Munich; SC Paderborn 07; SSV Jahn Regensburg; SV Sandhausen; FC St. Pauli | Arminia Bielefeld; Karlsruher SC; Preußen Münster; VfL Osnabrück |
Winners of 21 regional cup competitions
| Baden FC Nöttingen (Note: FC Nöttingen qualified as losing finalists as winners Karlsruher SC already qualified through their league position.); Bavaria (Note: The three regions with the most participating teams in their league competitions (Bavaria, Lower Saxony, Westphalia) are allowed to enter two teams for the competition.) TSV 1860 Rosenheim (CW) FV Illertissen (Note: FV Illertissen qualified as 3rd placed team in the 2012–13 Regionalliga Bayern as winners 1860 Munich II and runners-up Bayern Munich II are ineligible to play in the DFB-Pokal.); Berlin Berliner FC Dynamo; Brandenburg Optik Rathenow; Bremen SG Aumund-Vegesack; Hamburg SC Victoria Hamburg; Hesse Darmstadt 98 | Lower Rhine Sportfreunde Baumberg; Lower Saxony SV Wilhelmshaven (CW) BSV Schwarz-Weiß Rehden (Note: As Lower Saxony Cup Winners, VfL Osnabrück qualified through their league position and the Lower Saxony FA is allocated two places for the DFB-Pokal the losing semi-finalists had to play a play-off for the second spot. Rehden beat U.L.M. Wolfsburg 3–0 in this play-off.); Mecklenburg-Vorpommern TSG Neustrelitz; Middle Rhine Fortuna Köln; Rhineland Eintracht Trier; Saarland; 1. FC Saarbrücken; Saxony RB Leipzig | Saxony-Anhalt; 1. FC Magdeburg; Schleswig-Holstein VfR Neumünster; South Baden Bahlinger SC; Southwest TSG Pfeddersheim; Thuringia SV Schott Jena; Westphalia SV Lippstadt (Note: As Westphalia finalists Arminia Bielefeld qualified through their league position and the Westphalia FA is allocated two places for the DFB-Pokal the second spot goes to one of the semi-finalists. As the other losing semi-finalists SC Preußen Münster also qualified through their league position SV Lippstadt qualify without having to play a play-off.) SC Wiedenbrück; Württemberg (Note: Due to Dynamo Dresden's ban, Württemberg may send another team.); 1. FC Heidenheim (CW) Neckarsulmer SU |

== Schedule ==
The rounds of the 2013–14 competition are scheduled as follows:

| Round | Draw date | Matches |
|---|---|---|
| First round | | 2–5 August 2013 |
| Second round | | 24–25 September 2013 |
| Round of 16 | | 3–4 December 2013 |
| Quarter-finals | | 11–12 February 2014 |
| Semi-finals | | 15–16 April 2014 |
| Final | | 17 May 2014 at Olympiastadion, Berlin |

== Draw ==
The draws for the different rounds are conducted as following: For the first round, the participating teams will be split into two pots. The first pot contains all teams which have qualified through their regional cup competitions, the best four teams of the 3rd Liga and the bottom four teams of the Second Bundesliga. Every team from this pot will be drawn to a team from the second pot, which contains all remaining professional teams. The teams from the first pot will be set as the home team in the process.

The two-pot scenario will also be applied for the second round, with the remaining 3rd Liga/amateur teams in the first pot and the remaining professional teams in the other pot. Once one pot is empty, the remaining pairings will be drawn from the other pot with the first-drawn team for a match serving as hosts. For the remaining rounds, the draw will be conducted from just one pot. Any remaining 3rd Liga/amateur team will be the home team if drawn against a professional team. In every other case, the first-drawn team will serve as hosts. As it is as yet unclear whether MSV Duisburg will retain their license for 2. Bundesliga or not, there will be two hybrid lots bearing the teams of Duisburg and Erzgebirge Aue. Following the final decision that led to Duisburg losing their license, Duisburg was treated as an amateur side.

== Matches ==
=== First round ===
The draw took place on 15 June 2013.

| 2 August 2013 | VfL Osnabrück | 3–0 | Erzgebirge Aue | Osnabrück |
| 19:00 | Nagy 5', 67'; Spann 21' | Report | | Stadium: Osnatel-Arena; Attendance: 8,086; Referee: Bastian Dankert (Rostock) |

| 2 August 2013 | 1. FC Heidenheim | 1–1 (a.e.t.) (3–4 p) | 1860 Munich | Heidenheim |
| 19:00 | Göhlert 90+1' | Report | Stoppelkamp 50' | Stadium: Voith-Arena; Attendance: 10,000; Referee: Harm Osmers (Hanover) |
| | Penalties |
| | Krebs (penalty scored); Schnatterer (penalty scored); Mayer (penalty scored); Niederlechner (penalty missed); Heise (penalty missed) | | (penalty scored) Lauth; (penalty scored) Stark; (penalty scored) Adlung; (penalty scored) Stoppelkamp |

| 2 August 2013 | RB Leipzig | 0–2 | FC Augsburg | Leipzig |
| 20:00 | | Report | Callsen-Bracker 5'; Altıntop 69' | Stadium: Red Bull Arena; Attendance: 30,307; Referee: Tobias Stieler (Hamburg) |

| 3 August 2013 | Sportfreunde Baumberg | 1–4 | FC Ingolstadt | Leverkusen |
| 15:30 | Brüggemann 52' | Report | Hajnal 15'; Korkmaz 43'; Caiuby 77'; Schäffler 89' | Stadium: Ulrich-Haberland-Stadion; Attendance: 2,488; Referee: Sören Storks (Velen) |

| 3 August 2013 | SG Aumund-Vegesack | 0–9 | 1899 Hoffenheim | Bremen |
| 15:30 | | Report | Firmino 52', 66'; Modeste 56', 58'; Abraham 70'; Schipplock 80', 81'; Herdling 85', 85' | Stadium: Weserstadion Platz 11; Attendance: 4,500; Referee: Martin Thomsen (Kleve) |

| 3 August 2013 | Neckarsulmer SU | 0–7 | 1. FC Kaiserslautern | Heilbronn |
| 15:30 | | Report | Idrissou 28' (pen.), 84'; Gaus 37', 66'; Matmour 47'; Occéan 76', 77' | Stadium: Frankenstadion; Attendance: 9,283; Referee: René Rohde (Rostock) |

| 3 August 2013 | SV Lippstadt | 1–6 | Bayer Leverkusen | Lippstadt |
| 15:30 | Kolodzig 6' | Report | Bender 5'; Sam 24', 81'; Kießling 41', 86'; Son Heung-min 63' | Stadium: Stadion am Waldschlößchen; Attendance: 3,500; Referee: Tobias Christ (Münchweiler an der Rodalb) |

| 3 August 2013 | Fortuna Köln | 1–2 | 1. FSV Mainz 05 | Cologne |
| 15:30 | Kraus 6' | Report | Müller 14'; Choupo-Moting 87' | Stadium: Südstadion; Attendance: 6,712; Referee: Bibiana Steinhaus (Hanover) |

| 3 August 2013 | TSG Neustrelitz | 0–2 (a.e.t.) | SC Freiburg | Neustrelitz |
| 15:30 | | Report | Zuck 113', 118' | Stadium: Parkstadion; Attendance: 4,500; Referee: Arne Aarnink (Nordhorn) |

| 3 August 2013 | 1. FC Magdeburg | 0–1 | Energie Cottbus | Magdeburg |
| 15:30 | | Report | Jendrišek 84' | Stadium: MDCC-Arena; Attendance: 12,044; Referee: Daniel Siebert (Berlin) |

| 3 August 2013 | SV Wilhelmshaven | 0–3 | Borussia Dortmund | Wilhelmshaven |
| 15:30 | | Report | Großkreutz 71'; Ducksch 83'; Lewandowski 90' | Stadium: Jadestadion; Attendance: 8,000; Referee: Benjamin Brand (Gerolzhofen) |

| 3 August 2013 | Bahlinger SC | 1–3 | VfL Bochum | Bahlingen |
| 15:30 | Göppert 90+1' | Report | Ćwielong 17', 31'; Latza 63' | Stadium: Kaiserstuhlstadion; Attendance: 3,780; Referee: Malte Dittrich (Bremen) |

| 3 August 2013 | 1860 Rosenheim | 0–2 | VfR Aalen | Rosenheim |
| 18:00 | | Report | Junglas 51'; Klauß 85' | Stadium: TSV-Stadion – Sportanlage an der Jahnstraße; Attendance: 2,000; Referee: Thorben Siewer (Drolshagen) |

| 3 August 2013 | Eintracht Trier | 0–2 | 1. FC Köln | Trier |
| 20:30 | | Report | Risse 48' (pen.); Thiel 87' | Stadium: Moselstadion; Attendance: 10,494; Referee: Martin Petersen (Stuttgart) |

| 3 August 2013 | Karlsruher SC | 1–3 | VfL Wolfsburg | Karlsruhe |
| 20:30 | Alibaz 90' | Report | Perišić 15'; Diego 70'; Schäfer 90+2' | Stadium: Wildparkstadion; Attendance: 15,710; Referee: Jochen Drees (Münster-Sarmsheim) |

| 4 August 2013 | TSG Pfeddersheim | 0–2 | Greuther Fürth | Worms |
| 14:30 | | Report | Korcsmár 32'; Đurđić 84' | Stadium: EWR-Arena; Attendance: 3,500; Referee: Thorsten Schriever (Dorum) |

| 4 August 2013 | 1. FC Saarbrücken | 3–1 (a.e.t.) | Werder Bremen | Saarbrücken |
| 14:30 | Fischer 45'; Stegerer 105'; Ziemer 112' | Report | Gebre Selassie 59' | Stadium: Ludwigsparkstadion; Attendance: 15,424; Referee: Robert Kempter (Sauldorf) |

| 4 August 2013 | Darmstadt 98 | 0–0 (a.e.t.) (5–4 p) | Borussia Mönchengladbach | Darmstadt |
| 14:30 | | Report | | Stadium: Stadion am Böllenfalltor; Attendance: 16,500; Referee: Frank Willenborg (Osnabrück) |
| | Penalties |
| | Sulu (penalty scored); Sailer (penalty scored); Costa (penalty scored); Stegmayer (penalty scored); Stroh-Engel (penalty missed); Ivana (penalty scored) | | (penalty scored) Daems; (penalty missed) De Jong; (penalty scored) Xhaka; (penalty scored) Kruse; (penalty scored) Stranzl; (penalty missed) Hrgota |

| 4 August 2013 | Arminia Bielefeld | 2–1 | Eintracht Braunschweig | Bielefeld |
| 14:30 | Hille 36'; Jerat 72' | Report | Perthel 66' | Stadium: Bielefelder Alm; Attendance: 19,091; Referee: Felix Brych (Munich) |

| 4 August 2013 | Victoria Hamburg | 0–2 | Hannover 96 | Hamburg |
| 14:30 | | Report | Sobiech 69'; Huszti 90' | Stadium: Stadion Hoheluft; Attendance: 4,787; Referee: Marcel Unger (Halle) |

| 4 August 2013 | SCHOTT Jena | 0–4 | Hamburger SV | Jena |
| 16:00 | | Report | Rudņevs 72', 76'; Van der Vaart 79'; Zoua 83' | Stadium: Ernst-Abbe-Sportfeld; Attendance: 11,800; Referee: Christian Leicher (Landshut) |

| 4 August 2013 | SC Wiedenbrück | 1–0 | Fortuna Düsseldorf | Gütersloh |
| 16:00 | Studtrucker 90+1' (pen.) | Report | | Stadium: Heidewaldstadion; Attendance: 4,500; Referee: Arno Blos (Deizisau) |

| 4 August 2013 | Optik Rathenow | 1–3 (a.e.t.) | FSV Frankfurt | Rathenow |
| 16:00 | Çankaya 62' | Report | Leckie 21', 113'; Kapllani 117' | Stadium: Vogelgesang; Attendance: 2,006; Referee: Sven Jablonski (Bremen) |

| 4 August 2013 | BFC Dynamo | 0–2 | VfB Stuttgart | Berlin |
| 16:00 | | Report | Ibišević 40', 76' (pen.) | Stadium: Friedrich-Ludwig-Jahn-Sportpark; Attendance: 9,227; Referee: Guido Winkmann (Kerken) |

| 4 August 2013 | VfR Neumünster | 2–3 (a.e.t.) | Hertha BSC | Neumünster |
| 16:00 | Harrer 5'; Kramer 59' | Report | Ben-Hatira 16', 30'; Allagui 120+1' | Stadium: Grümmi-Arena; Attendance: 5,468; Referee: Benjamin Cortus (Röthenbach) |

| 4 August 2013 | FV Illertissen | 0–2 | Eintracht Frankfurt | Augsburg |
| 18:30 | | Report | Joselu 64'; Rode 90+2' | Stadium: SGL-Arena; Attendance: 6,000; Referee: Patrick Ittrich (Hamburg) |

| 4 August 2013 | Preußen Münster | 1–0 | FC St. Pauli | Münster |
| 18:30 | Taylor 31' | Report | | Stadium: Preußen-Stadion; Attendance: 15,000; Referee: Robert Kampka (Mainz) |

| 4 August 2013 | SV Sandhausen | 1–1 (a.e.t.) (4–3 p) | 1. FC Nürnberg | Sandhausen |
| 20:30 | Schauerte 58' (pen.) | Report | Ginczek 27' | Stadium: Hardtwaldstadion; Attendance: 8,500; Referee: Norbert Grudzinski (Hamburg) |
| | Penalties |
| | Schauerte (penalty scored); Löning (penalty scored); Achenbach (penalty scored); Blum (penalty scored) | | (penalty scored) Kiyotake; (penalty missed) Balitsch; (penalty scored) Ginczek; (penalty scored) Nilsson; (penalty missed) Plattenhardt |

| 5 August 2013 | MSV Duisburg | 2–3 | SC Paderborn | Duisburg |
| 18:30 | Gardawski 31'; Oršula 90+1' | Report | Brückner 37'; Ten Voorde 38'; Wemmer 80' | Stadium: Schauinsland-Reisen-Arena; Attendance: 17,191; Referee: Markus Wingenbach (Mainz) |

| 5 August 2013 | Jahn Regensburg | 1–2 | Union Berlin | Regensburg |
| 18:30 | Amachaibou 19' | Report | Brandy 21'; Köhler 42' | Stadium: Jahnstadion; Attendance: 6,249; Referee: Tobias Welz (Wiesbaden) |

| 5 August 2013 | FC Nöttingen | 0–2 | Schalke 04 | Karlsruhe |
| 18:30 | | Report | Huntelaar 30'; Goretzka 90+4' | Stadium: Wildparkstadion; Attendance: 12,470; Referee: Christian Dietz (Kronach) |

| 5 August 2013 | Schwarz-Weiß Rehden | 0–5 | Bayern Munich | Osnabrück |
| 20:30 | | Report | Shaqiri 18'; Müller 45', 59' (pen.), 64'; Robben 88' | Stadium: Osnatel-Arena; Attendance: 16,600; Referee: Christian Bandurski (Oberhausen) |

=== Second round ===
The draw took place on 10 August 2013.

| 24 September 2013 | Preußen Münster | 0–3 | FC Augsburg | Münster |
| 19:00 | | Report | Werner 45+1', 57'; Mölders 59' | Stadium: Preußen-Stadion; Attendance: 14,379; Referee: Markus Schmidt (Stuttgart) |

| 24 September 2013 | SC Wiedenbrück | 1–3 | SV Sandhausen | Gütersloh |
| 19:00 | Sumelka 39' | Report | Jovanović 62', 67'; Ulm 65' | Stadium: Heidewaldstadion; Attendance: 1,807; Referee: Frank Willenborg (Osnabrück) |

| 24 September 2013 | 1860 Munich | 0–2 (a.e.t.) | Borussia Dortmund | Munich |
| 19:00 | | Report | Aubameyang 105' (pen.); Mkhitaryan 107' | Stadium: Allianz Arena; Attendance: 71,000; Referee: Michael Weiner (Ottenstein) |

| 24 September 2013 | VfL Wolfsburg | 2–0 | VfR Aalen | Wolfsburg |
| 19:00 | Diego 45+2'; Klose 82' | Report | | Stadium: Volkswagen Arena; Attendance: 6,718; Referee: Günter Perl (Pullach) |

| 24 September 2013 | Arminia Bielefeld | 0–2 | Bayer Leverkusen | Bielefeld |
| 20:30 | | Report | Son Heung-min 62'; Sam 89' | Stadium: Bielefelder Alm; Attendance: 23,709; Referee: Florian Meyer (Burgdorf) |

| 24 September 2013 | Hamburger SV | 1–0 | Greuther Fürth | Hamburg |
| 20:30 | Lasogga 59' | Report | | Stadium: Imtech Arena; Attendance: 26,248; Referee: Sascha Stegemann (Niederkassel) |

| 24 September 2013 | 1899 Hoffenheim | 3–0 (a.e.t.) | Energie Cottbus | Sinsheim |
| 20:30 | Süle 95'; Firmino 103'; Schipplock 117' | Report | | Stadium: Rhein-Neckar-Arena; Attendance: 12,000; Referee: Peter Sippel (Munich) |

| 24 September 2013 | Mainz 05 | 0–1 | 1. FC Köln | Mainz |
| 20:30 | | Report | Risse 53' | Stadium: Coface Arena; Attendance: 22,782; Referee: Peter Gagelmann (Bremen) |

| 25 September 2013 | 1. FC Saarbrücken | 2–1 | SC Paderborn | Saarbrücken |
| 19:00 | Rathgeber 7', 38' | Report | Sağlık 71' | Stadium: Ludwigsparkstadion; Attendance: 7,300; Referee: Robert Hartmann (Wangen) |

| 25 September 2013 | Eintracht Frankfurt | 2–0 | VfL Bochum | Frankfurt |
| 19:00 | Inui 24'; Aigner 25' | Report | | Stadium: Commerzbank-Arena; Attendance: 28,100; Referee: Guido Winkmann (Kerken) |

| 25 September 2013 | FSV Frankfurt | 0–2 | FC Ingolstadt | Frankfurt |
| 19:00 | | Report | Hajnal 28'; Hofmann 47' | Stadium: Frankfurter Volksbank Stadion; Attendance: 3,089; Referee: Christian Dingert (Lebecksmühle) |

| 25 September 2013 | 1. FC Kaiserslautern | 3–1 | Hertha BSC | Kaiserslautern |
| 19:00 | Idrissou 52'; Matmour 63'; Occéan 83' | Report | Niemeyer 25' | Stadium: Fritz-Walter-Stadion; Attendance: 24,291; Referee: Thorsten Kinhöfer (Herne) |

| 25 September 2013 | VfL Osnabrück | 0–1 | Union Berlin | Osnabrück |
| 20:30 | | Report | Mattuschka 14' | Stadium: Osnatel-Arena; Attendance: 11,194; Referee: Christian Fischer (Hemer) |

| 25 September 2013 | Darmstadt 98 | 1–3 | Schalke 04 | Darmstadt |
| 20:30 | Behrens 36' | Report | Farfán 35'; Höwedes 58'; Meyer 86' | Stadium: Stadion am Böllenfalltor; Attendance: 17,000; Referee: Felix Zwayer (Berlin) |

| 25 September 2013 | Bayern Munich | 4–1 | Hannover 96 | Munich |
| 20:30 | Müller 17', 64'; Pizarro 27'; Ribéry 78' | Report | Ya Konan 37' | Stadium: Allianz Arena; Attendance: 66,000; Referee: Jochen Drees (Münster-Sarmsheim) |

| 25 September 2013 | SC Freiburg | 2–1 | VfB Stuttgart | Freiburg |
| 20:30 | Ginter 52'; Hanke 70' | Report | Ibišević 87' | Stadium: Mage Solar Stadion; Attendance: 22,500; Referee: Wolfgang Stark (Ergolding) |

=== Round of 16 ===
The draw took place on 29 September 2013.

| 3 December 2013 | Union Berlin | 0–3 | 1. FC Kaiserslautern | Berlin |
| 19:00 | | Report | Orbán 18'; Zoller 45+1'; Gaus 83' | Stadium: Stadion An der Alten Försterei; Attendance: 21,717; Referee: Peter Sippel (Munich) |

| 3 December 2013 | Hamburger SV | 2–1 | 1. FC Köln | Hamburg |
| 19:00 | Beister 42'; Iličević 85' | Report | Matuszczyk 54' | Stadium: Imtech Arena; Attendance: 57,000; Referee: Florian Meyer (Burgdorf) |

| 3 December 2013 | Schalke 04 | 1–3 | 1899 Hoffenheim | Gelsenkirchen |
| 20:30 | Farfán 67' | Report | Herdling 21'; Volland 32'; Firmino 35' | Stadium: Veltins-Arena; Attendance: 51,078; Referee: Knut Kircher (Rottenburg) |

| 3 December 2013 | 1. FC Saarbrücken | 0–2 | Borussia Dortmund | Saarbrücken |
| 20:30 | | Report | Schieber 19'; Hofmann 48' | Stadium: Ludwigsparkstadion; Attendance: 30,931; Referee: Marco Fritz (Korb) |

| 4 December 2013 | SC Freiburg | 1–2 | Bayer Leverkusen | Freiburg |
| 19:00 | Günter 14' | Report | Kruse 1'; Can 77' | Stadium: Mage Solar Stadion; Attendance: 16,400; Referee: Thorsten Kinhöfer (Herne) |

| 4 December 2013 | VfL Wolfsburg | 2–1 | FC Ingolstadt | Wolfsburg |
| 19:00 | Naldo 66'; Olić 89' | Report | Caiuby 17' | Stadium: Volkswagen Arena; Attendance: 7,846; Referee: Markus Schmidt (Stuttgart) |

| 4 December 2013 | Eintracht Frankfurt | 4–2 | SV Sandhausen | Frankfurt |
| 20:30 | Joselu 19', 49' (pen.), 90+2'; Kadlec 72' | Report | Rode 64' (o.g.); Tüting 66' | Stadium: Commerzbank-Arena; Attendance: 18,200; Referee: Bastian Dankert (Rostock) |

| 4 December 2013 | FC Augsburg | 0–2 | Bayern Munich | Augsburg |
| 20:30 | | Report | Robben 4'; Müller 78' | Stadium: SGL arena Attendance: 30,660; Referee: Felix Zwayer (Berlin) |

=== Quarter-finals ===
The draw took place on 8 December 2013.

| 11 February 2014 | Eintracht Frankfurt | 0–1 | Borussia Dortmund | Frankfurt |
| 20:45 | | Report | Aubameyang 83' | Stadium: Commerzbank-Arena; Attendance: 51,500; Referee: Knut Kircher (Rottenburg) |

| 12 February 2014 | 1899 Hoffenheim | 2–3 | VfL Wolfsburg | Sinsheim |
| 19:00 | Firmino 39', 90+1' | Report | Rodriguez 26' (pen.), 44' (pen.); Dost 64' | Stadium: Rhein-Neckar-Arena; Attendance: 13,347; Referee: Peter Gagelmann (Bremen) |

| 12 February 2014 | Bayer Leverkusen | 0–1 (a.e.t.) | 1. FC Kaiserslautern | Leverkusen |
| 19:00 | | Report | Jenssen 116' | Stadium: BayArena; Attendance: 25,244; Referee: Tobias Welz (Wiesbaden) |

| 12 February 2014 | Hamburger SV | 0–5 | Bayern Munich | Hamburg |
| 20:30 | | Report | Mandžukić 22', 74', 76'; Dante 26'; Robben 54' | Stadium: Imtech Arena; Attendance: 57,000; Referee: Felix Zwayer (Berlin) |

=== Semi-finals ===
The draw took place on 12 February 2014.

15 April 2014
20:30

| Borussia Dortmund | 2–0 | VfL Wolfsburg |
|---|---|---|
| Mkhitaryan 13'; Lewandowski 43' | Report |

Westfalenstadion, Dortmund
Attendance: 80,200
Referee: Manuel Gräfe (Berlin)

16 April 2014
20:30

| Bayern Munich | 5–1 | 1. FC Kaiserslautern |
|---|---|---|
| Schweinsteiger 24'; Kroos 32'; Müller 50' (pen.); Mandžukić 78'; Götze 90+1' | Report | Zoller 60' |

Allianz Arena, Munich
Attendance: 71,000
Referee: Thorsten Kinhöfer (Herne)

=== Final ===
17 May 2014
20:00 CEST

| Borussia Dortmund | 0–2 (a.e.t.) | Bayern Munich |
|---|---|---|
| | Report | Robben 107'; Müller 120+3' |

Olympiastadion, Berlin
Attendance: 76,197
Referee: Florian Meyer (Burgdorf)

== Bracket ==
First round
FV Illertissen | 0
Eintracht Frankfurt | 2
Bahlinger SC | 1
VfL Bochum | 3
SC Wiedenbrück | 1
Fortuna Düsseldorf | 0
SV Sandhausen | 1
1. FC Nürnberg | 1
1. FC Saarbrücken | 3
Werder Bremen | 1
MSV Duisburg | 2
SC Paderborn | 3
1. FC Heidenheim | 1
1860 Munich | 1
SV Wilhelmshaven | 0
Borussia Dortmund | 3
Darmstadt 98 | 0
Borussia Mönchengladbach | 0
FC Nöttingen | 0
Schalke 04 | 2
SG Aumund-Vegesack | 0
1899 Hoffenheim | 9
1. FC Magdeburg | 0
Energie Cottbus | 1
Karlsruher SC | 1
VfL Wolfsburg | 3
1860 Rosenheim | 0
VfR Aalen | 2
Optik Rathenow | 1
FSV Frankfurt | 3
Sportfreunde Baumberg | 1
FC Ingolstadt | 4
SCHOTT Jena | 0
Hamburger SV | 4
TSG Pfeddersheim | 0
Greuther Fürth | 2
Fortuna Köln | 1
Mainz 05 | 2
Eintracht Trier | 0
1. FC Köln | 2
Preußen Münster | 1
FC St. Pauli | 0
RB Leipzig | 0
FC Augsburg | 2
Schwarz-Weiß Rehden | 0
Bayern Munich | 5
Victoria Hamburg | 0
Hannover 96 | 2
TSG Neustrelitz | 0
SC Freiburg | 2
Dynamo Berlin | 0
VfB Stuttgart | 2
Arminia Bielefeld | 2
Eintracht Braunschweig | 1
SV Lippstadt | 1
Bayer Leverkusen | 6
VfL Osnabrück | 3
Erzgebirge Aue | 0
Jahn Regensburg | 1
Union Berlin | 2
Neckarsulmer SU | 0
1. FC Kaiserslautern | 7
VfR Neumünster | 2
Hertha BSC | 3

Second round
Eintracht Frankfurt | 2
VfL Bochum | 0
SC Wiedenbrück | 1
SV Sandhausen | 3
1. FC Saarbrücken | 2
SC Paderborn | 1
1860 Munich | 0
Borussia Dortmund | 2
Darmstadt 98 | 1
Schalke 04 | 3
1899 Hoffenheim | 3
Energie Cottbus | 0
VfL Wolfsburg | 2
VfR Aalen | 0
FSV Frtankfurt | 0
FC Ingolstadt | 2
Hamburger SV | 1
Greuther Fürth | 0
Mainz 05 | 0
1. FC Köln | 1
Preußen Münster | 0
FC Augsburg | 3
Bayern Munich | 4
Hannover 96 | 1
SC Freiburg | 2
VfB Stuttgart | 1
Arminia Bielefeld | 0
Bayer Leverkusen | 2
VfL Osnabrück | 0
Union Berlin | 1
1. FC Kaiserslautern | 3
Hertha BSC | 1

Round of 16
Eintracht Frankfurt | 4
SV Sandhausen | 2
1. FC Saarbrücken | 0
Borussia Dortmund | 2
Schalke 04 | 1
1899 Hoffenheim | 3
VfL Wolfsburg | 2
FC Ingolstadt | 1
Hamburger SV | 2
1. FC Köln | 1
FC Augsburg | 0
Bayern Munich | 2
SC Freiburg | 1
Bayer Leverkusen | 2
Union Berlin | 0
1. FC Kaiserslautern | 3

Quarter–finals
Eintracht Frankfurt | 0
Borussia Dortmund | 1
1899 Hoffenheim | 2
VfL Wolfsburg | 3
Hamburger SV | 0
Bayern Munich | 5
Bayer Leverkusen | 0
1. FC Kaiserslautern | 1

Semi–finals
Borussia Dortmund | 2
VfL Wolfsburg | 0
Bayern Munich | 5
1. FC Kaiserslautern | 1

Final
Borussia Dortmund | 0
Bayern Munich | 2

== Top goalscorers ==
The following are the top scorers of the DFB-Pokal, sorted first by number of goals, and then alphabetically if necessary. Goals scored in penalty shoot-outs are not included.

| Rank | Player | Team | Goals |
|---|---|---|---|
| 1 | (Germany) Thomas Müller | Bayern Munich | 8 |
| 2 | (Brazil) Roberto Firmino | 1899 Hoffenheim | 6 |
| 3 | (Spain) Joselu | Eintracht Frankfurt | 4 |
| 3 | (Croatia) Mario Mandzukic | Bayern Munich | 4 |
| 3 | (Netherlands) Arjen Robben | Bayern Munich | 4 |
| 6 | (Germany) Marcel Gaus | Kaiserslautern | 3 |
| 6 | (Germany) Kai Herdling | 1899 Hoffenheim | 3 |
| 6 | (Bosnia and Herzegovina) Vedad Ibišević | VfB Stuttgart | 3 |
| 6 | (Cameroon) Mohamadou Idrissou | Kaiserslautern | 3 |
| 6 | (Canada) Olivier Occéan | Kaiserslautern | 3 |
| 6 | (Germany) Sidney Sam | Bayer Leverkusen | 3 |
| 6 | (Germany) Sven Schipplock | 1899 Hoffenheim | 3 |
