= List of German football transfers winter 2013–14 =

This is a list of German football transfers in the winter transfer window 2013–14 by club. Only transfers of the Bundesliga, and 2. Bundesliga are included.

== Bundesliga ==
=== Bayern Munich ===
In:

Out:

Note: Flags indicate national team as has been defined under FIFA eligibility rules. Players may hold more than one non-FIFA nationality.

No.	Pos.	Nation	Player
36	MF	AUT	Alessandro Schöpf (from Bayern Munich II)
37	FW	GER	Julian Green (from Bayern Munich II)

No.	Pos.	Nation	Player
15	DF	GER	Jan Kirchhoff (on loan to FC Schalke 04)

=== Borussia Dortmund ===
In:

No.	Pos.	Nation	Player
14	MF	SRB	Miloš Jojić (from FK Partizan)

Out:

No.	Pos.	Nation	Player
30	DF	GER	Koray Günter (to Galatasaray S.K.)

=== Bayer 04 Leverkusen ===
In:

No.	Pos.	Nation	Player
19	MF	GER	Julian Brandt (from VfL Wolfsburg U19)
20	MF	MEX	Andrés Guardado (on loan from Valencia CF)
24	FW	KOR	Ryu Seung-Woo (on loan from Jeju United FC)

Out:

No.	Pos.	Nation	Player
31	MF	GER	Dominik Kohr (on loan to FC Augsburg)

=== FC Schalke 04 ===
In:

No.	Pos.	Nation	Player
3	DF	GER	Jan Kirchhoff (on loan from Bayern Munich)
15	DF	GER	Dennis Aogo (from Hamburger SV, previously on loan)

Out:

No.	Pos.	Nation	Player
13	MF	USA	Jermaine Jones (to Beşiktaş J.K.)
36	GK	GER	Lars Unnerstall (on loan to FC Aarau)

=== SC Freiburg ===
In:

No.	Pos.	Nation	Player
15	FW	AUT	Philipp Zulechner (from SV Grödig)

Out:

No.	Pos.	Nation	Player
--	MF	GER	Marc Lais (on loan to Chemnitzer FC, previously on loan at SV Sandhausen)

=== Eintracht Frankfurt ===
In:

No.	Pos.	Nation	Player
26	MF	GER	Tobias Weis (on loan from 1899 Hoffenheim)
39	DF	GER	Alexander Madlung (free agent)

Out:

No.	Pos.	Nation	Player
11	FW	CRO	Srđan Lakić (loan return to VfL Wolfsburg)
19	MF	GER	Marvin Bakalorz (on loan to SC Paderborn 07)
--	FW	CAN	Rob Friend (to Los Angeles Galaxy, previously on loan at 1860 Munich)

=== Hamburger SV ===
In:

No.	Pos.	Nation	Player
6	MF	NED	Ouasim Bouy (on loan from Juventus)
25	FW	NED	Ola John (on loan from S.L. Benfica)

Out:

No.	Pos.	Nation	Player
10	FW	LAT	Artjoms Rudņevs (on loan to Hannover 96)
44	MF	SRB	Gojko Kačar (on loan to Cerezo Osaka)
--	DF	GER	Dennis Aogo (to FC Schalke 04, previously on loan)

=== Borussia Mönchengladbach ===
In:

No.	Pos.	Nation	Player

Out:

No.	Pos.	Nation	Player
9	FW	NED	Luuk de Jong (on loan to Newcastle United)

=== Hannover 96 ===
In:

No.	Pos.	Nation	Player
16	FW	LAT	Artjoms Rudņevs (on loan from Hamburger SV)
22	DF	CZE	František Rajtoral (on loan from Viktoria Plzeň)

Out:

No.	Pos.	Nation	Player
16	MF	BRA	França (on loan to Palmeiras)
22	MF	SUI	Adrian Nikçi (on loan to FC Thun)
27	FW	GER	Deniz Kadah (to Çaykur Rizespor)
35	DF	AZE	Ali Gökdemir (on loan to Elazığspor)

=== 1. FC Nürnberg ===
In:

No.	Pos.	Nation	Player
20	MF	ESP	José Campaña (on loan from Crystal Palace F.C.)
31	MF	CZE	Ondřej Petrák (from Slavia Prague)

Out:

No.	Pos.	Nation	Player
19	DF	GER	Noah Korczowski (to VfL Wolfsburg II)
20	MF	AUT	Muhammed Ildiz (to Gaziantepspor)
27	MF	GER	Markus Mendler (on loan to SV Sandhausen)
33	MF	GER	Alexander Esswein (to FC Augsburg)

=== VfL Wolfsburg ===
In:

No.	Pos.	Nation	Player
14	MF	BEL	Kevin De Bruyne (from Chelsea)
19	MF	BEL	Bernard Malanda-Adje (loan return from S.V. Zulte Waregem)

Out:

No.	Pos.	Nation	Player
10	MF	BRA	Diego (to Atlético Madrid)
18	MF	KOR	Koo Ja-Cheol (to 1. FSV Mainz 05)
--	MF	CIV	Ibrahim Sissoko (on loan to Deportivo de La Coruña, previously on loan at AS Saint-Étienne)
--	FW	CRO	Srđan Lakić (to 1. FC Kaiserslautern, previously on loan at Eintracht Frankfurt)

=== VfB Stuttgart ===
In:

No.	Pos.	Nation	Player
11	MF	ECU	Carlos Gruezo (from Barcelona Sporting Club)

Out:

No.	Pos.	Nation	Player
4	MF	DEN	William Kvist (on loan to Fulham F.C.)
12	DF	GER	Benedikt Röcker (to SpVgg Greuther Fürth)
17	FW	TUR	Tunay Torun (to Kasımpaşa SK)
21	DF	ITA	Cristian Molinaro (to Parma F.C.)

=== 1. FSV Mainz 05 ===
In:

No.	Pos.	Nation	Player
13	MF	KOR	Koo Ja-Cheol (from VfL Wolfsburg)
15	GK	CRO	Dario Krešić (from Lokomotiv Moscow)
28	MF	BUL	Todor Nedelev (from Botev Plovdiv)

Out:

No.	Pos.	Nation	Player
17	MF	GER	Chinedu Ede (on loan to 1. FC Kaiserslautern)

=== Werder Bremen ===
In:

No.	Pos.	Nation	Player
7	MF	POL	Ludovic Obraniak (from FC Girondins de Bordeaux)

Out:

No.	Pos.	Nation	Player
4	MF	CRO	Mateo Pavlović (on loan to Ferencvárosi TC)
25	MF	GER	Tom Trybull (to FC St. Pauli)

=== FC Augsburg ===
In:

No.	Pos.	Nation	Player
11	MF	GER	Alexander Esswein (from 1. FC Nürnberg)
21	MF	GER	Dominik Kohr (on loan from Bayer Leverkusen)
24	FW	KOR	Ji Dong-Won (on loan from Sunderland)
39	MF	GER	Erik Thommy (from FC Augsburg II)

Out:

No.	Pos.	Nation	Player
11	FW	GRE	Panagiotis Vlachodimos (loan return to Olympiacos F.C.)
21	FW	GER	Mathias Fetsch (on loan to Energie Cottbus)
24	FW	USA	Michael Parkhurst (to Columbus Crew)

=== 1899 Hoffenheim ===
In:

No.	Pos.	Nation	Player
11	FW	SWE	Jiloan Hamad (from Malmö FF)

Out:

No.	Pos.	Nation	Player
1	GK	GER	Tim Wiese (released)
3	DF	GER	Matthias Jaissle (released)
15	DF	FRA	Matthieu Delpierre (to FC Utrecht)
17	MF	GER	Tobias Weis (on loan to Eintracht Frankfurt)
32	MF	GER	Vincenzo Grifo (on loan to Dynamo Dresden)
39	MF	GER	Andreas Ludwig (on loan to 1860 München)
--	MF	PER	Junior Ponce (on loan to Alianza Lima, previously on loan)
--	DF	PER	Luis Advíncula (on loan to Sporting Cristal, previously on loan at AA Ponte Preta)

=== Hertha BSC ===
In:

No.	Pos.	Nation	Player
22	GK	NOR	Rune Jarstein (from Viking FK)

Out:

No.	Pos.	Nation	Player
14	FW	ISR	Ben Sahar (on loan to Arminia Bielefeld)

=== Eintracht Braunschweig ===
In:

No.	Pos.	Nation	Player
7	FW	NOR	Håvard Nielsen (on loan from FC Red Bull Salzburg)
22	MF	SUI	Salim Khelifi (from FC Lausanne-Sport)

Out:

No.	Pos.	Nation	Player
18	FW	CAN	Simeon Jackson (to Millwall F.C.)

== 2. Bundesliga ==
=== Fortuna Düsseldorf ===
In:

No.	Pos.	Nation	Player
5	MF	AUT	Michael Liendl (from Wolfsberger AC)

Out:

No.	Pos.	Nation	Player
16	FW	GER	Gerrit Wegkamp (on loan to MSV Duisburg)
27	FW	GER	Stefan Reisinger (to 1. FC Saarbrücken)

=== SpVgg Greuther Fürth ===
In:

No.	Pos.	Nation	Player
2	DF	GER	Benedikt Röcker (from VfB Stuttgart)

Out:

No.	Pos.	Nation	Player
15	DF	GER	Michael Hefele (on loan to Wacker Burghausen)
23	DF	GER	Kevin Schulze (on loan to Holstein Kiel)
25	FW	GER	Stefan Lex (to FC Ingolstadt 04)

=== 1. FC Kaiserslautern ===
In:

No.	Pos.	Nation	Player
14	MF	GER	Chinedu Ede (on loan from 1. FSV Mainz 05)
18	FW	CRO	Srđan Lakić (from VfL Wolfsburg, previously on loan at Eintracht Frankfurt)

Out:

No.	Pos.	Nation	Player
4	MF	POL	Ariel Borysiuk (on loan to FC Volga Nizhny Novgorod)
18	FW	USA	Andrew Wooten (on loan to FSV Frankfurt)
30	MF	AUT	Christopher Drazan (on loan to Rot-Weiß Erfurt)

=== FSV Frankfurt ===
In:

No.	Pos.	Nation	Player
7	MF	GER	Marc-André Kruska (from Energie Cottbus)
19	FW	USA	Andrew Wooten (on loan from 1. FC Kaiserslautern)
30	MF	GER	Faton Toski (free agent)

Out:

No.	Pos.	Nation	Player
19	FW	GER	Markus Ziereis (on loan to SV Darmstadt 98)

=== 1. FC Köln ===
In:

No.	Pos.	Nation	Player
25	MF	JPN	Kazuki Nagasawa (from Yokohama F. Marinos)
26	FW	NOR	Bård Finne (from SK Brann)

Out:

No.	Pos.	Nation	Player
19	MF	CRO	Mato Jajalo (on loan to FK Sarajevo)
24	FW	POL	Kacper Przybyłko (on loan to Arminia Bielefeld)
--	FW	SLO	Milivoje Novaković (released, previously on loan at Omiya Ardija)

=== 1860 Munich ===
In:

No.	Pos.	Nation	Player
8	MF	GER	Andreas Ludwig (on loan from 1899 Hoffenheim)
9	FW	JPN	Yuya Osako (from Kashima Antlers)
21	MF	GER	Markus Steinhöfer (from Real Betis)

Out:

No.	Pos.	Nation	Player
9	FW	CAN	Rob Friend (loan return to Eintracht Frankfurt)

=== 1. FC Union Berlin ===
In:

No.	Pos.	Nation	Player
16	MF	EGY	Abdallah Gomaa (on loan from ENPPI Club)

Out:

No.	Pos.	Nation	Player
23	FW	BRA	Silvio (to Wolfsberger AC)

=== Energie Cottbus ===
In:

No.	Pos.	Nation	Player
24	FW	GER	Mathias Fetsch (on loan from FC Augsburg)
35	MF	GER	Sven Michel (from Borussia Mönchengladbach II)

Out:

No.	Pos.	Nation	Player
8	MF	GER	Marc-André Kruska (to FSV Frankfurt)
9	FW	COL	John Jairo Mosquera (released)
23	DF	GER	Markus Brzenska (to Viktoria Köln)

=== VfR Aalen ===
In:

No.	Pos.	Nation	Player
18	MF	GER	Maximilian Oesterhelweg (from Eintracht Frankfurt II)
29	MF	GER	Nejmeddin Daghfous (from FSV Mainz 05 II)

Out:

No.	Pos.	Nation	Player

=== FC St. Pauli ===
In:

No.	Pos.	Nation	Player
35	MF	GER	Tom Trybull (from Werder Bremen)

Out:

No.	Pos.	Nation	Player

=== SC Paderborn 07 ===
In:

No.	Pos.	Nation	Player
6	MF	GER	Marvin Bakalorz (on loan from Eintracht Frankfurt)
30	MF	GER	Süleyman Koç (from SV Babelsberg 03)

Out:

No.	Pos.	Nation	Player
3	DF	GER	Fabian Scheffer (on loan to Carl Zeiss Jena)
4	MF	GER	Diego Demme (to RB Leipzig)
6	MF	GER	Manuel Zeitz (on loan to 1. FC Saarbrücken)

=== FC Ingolstadt 04 ===
In:

No.	Pos.	Nation	Player
--	FW	GER	Stefan Lex (from SpVgg Greuther Fürth)

Out:

No.	Pos.	Nation	Player
14	FW	AUT	Ümit Korkmaz (to Çaykur Rizespor)
17	FW	GER	Manuel Schäffler (to Holstein Kiel)

=== VfL Bochum ===
In:

No.	Pos.	Nation	Player

Out:

No.	Pos.	Nation	Player
12	FW	DEN	Ken Ilsø (released)
29	FW	CRO	Mario Jelavić (released)
30	DF	GER	Mounir Chaftar (to 1. FC Saarbrücken)

=== FC Erzgebirge Aue ===
In:

No.	Pos.	Nation	Player
5	DF	SVK	Filip Lukšík (free agent)
7	MF	GER	Bastian Hohmann (from Vasas SC)
9	FW	GER	Frank Löning (from SV Sandhausen)

Out:

No.	Pos.	Nation	Player
5	DF	AUT	Ronald Gërçaliu (to Universitatea Cluj)
31	MF	GER	Kevin Pezzoni (to 1. FC Saarbrücken)
34	MF	JPN	Taku Ishihara (on loan to 1. FC Saarbrücken)

=== Dynamo Dresden ===
In:

No.	Pos.	Nation	Player
19	MF	GER	Vincenzo Grifo (on loan from 1899 Hoffenheim)

Out:

No.	Pos.	Nation	Player
9	FW	GER	Soufian Benyamina (on loan to Preußen Münster)
20	GK	GER	Nico Pellatz (to Viktoria Köln)

=== SV Sandhausen ===
In:

No.	Pos.	Nation	Player
9	FW	FRA	Adama Diakité (free agent)
20	MF	NGR	Eke Uzoma (free agent)
23	MF	GER	Markus Mendler (on loan from 1. FC Nürnberg)

Out:

No.	Pos.	Nation	Player
9	FW	GER	Frank Löning (to Erzgebirge Aue)
15	DF	GER	Marco Pischorn (to Preußen Münster)
23	MF	GER	Marc Lais (loan return to SC Freiburg)

=== Karlsruher SC ===
In:

No.	Pos.	Nation	Player

Out:

No.	Pos.	Nation	Player
9	FW	ALG	Karim Benyamina (to MC El Eulma)

=== Arminia Bielefeld ===
In:

No.	Pos.	Nation	Player
10	FW	POL	Kacper Przybyłko (on loan from 1.FC Köln)
28	DF	SRB	Vujadin Savić (on loan from FC Girondins de Bordeaux)
35	FW	ISR	Ben Sahar (on loan from Hertha BSC)

Out:

No.	Pos.	Nation	Player
18	FW	CGO	Francky Sembolo (on loan to Hallescher FC)

== See also ==
- 2013–14 Bundesliga
- 2013–14 2. Bundesliga
