= Marco Ban =

German footballer

Personal information
- Full name: Marco Ban
- Date of birth: 26 August 1994 (age 32)
- Place of birth: Germany
- Height: 1.80 m (5 ft 11 in)
- Position: Forward

Team information
- Current team: SpVg Frechen 20
- Number: 14

Youth career
- –2009: Stuttgarter Kickers
- 2009: 1. JFS Köln
- 2010–2013: 1. FC Köln

Senior career*
Years	Team	Apps	(Gls)
2013–2014	1. FC Köln II	21	(5)
2014–2015	Fortuna Köln	2	(0)
2014	Fortuna Köln II	1	(1)
2015–2017	1. FC Köln II	48	(4)
2017–2018	Bonner SC	9	(0)
2018–	SpVg Frechen 20	37	(2)
- * Club domestic league appearances and goals as of 20:20, 1 December 2019 (UTC)

Marco Ban (born 26 August 1994) is a German footballer who plays as a forward for SpVg Frechen 20.

== Career ==
Ban made his professional debut for Fortuna Köln in the 3. Liga on 16 May 2015, coming on as a substitute in the 58th minute for Thomas Kraus in the 2–1 home win against Wehen Wiesbaden.
