= Daniel Beichler =

Austrian footballer (born 1988)

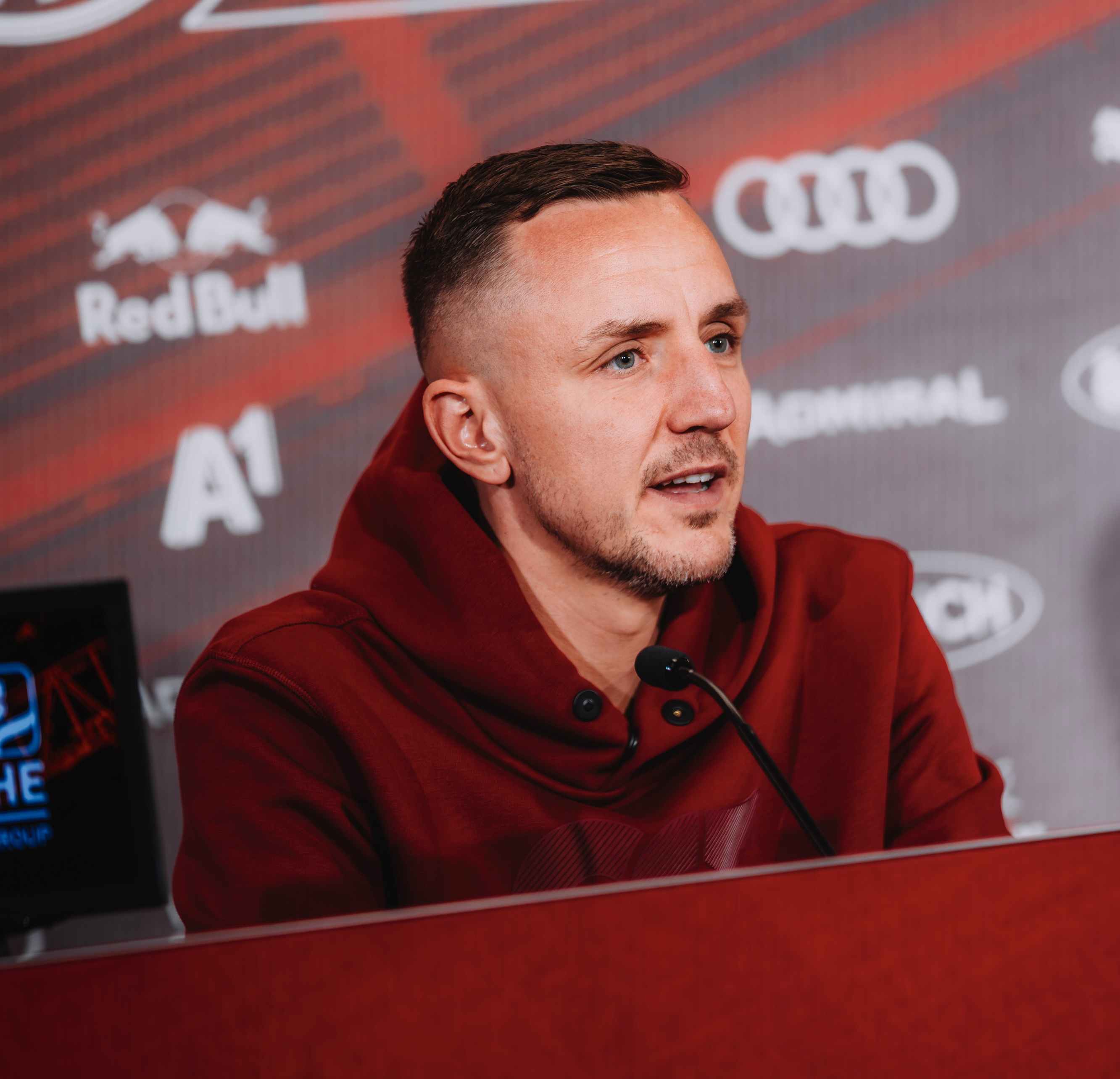
- Beichler in 2026

Personal information
- Date of birth: 13 October 1988 (age 38)
- Place of birth: Graz, Austria
- Height: 1.83 m (6 ft 0 in)
- Position: Striker

Youth career
- Grambach
- 1996–2006: Sturm Graz

Senior career*
Years	Team	Apps	(Gls)
2006–2010	Sturm Graz	64	(21)
2007	→ Reggina (loan)	0	(0)
2010–2013	Hertha BSC II	7	(2)
2010–2013	Hertha BSC	1	(0)
2011	→ St. Gallen (loan)	7	(0)
2011	→ MSV Duisburg (loan)	1	(0)
2011–2012	→ SV Ried (loan)	26	(4)
2013	→ SV Sandhausen (loan)	7	(0)
2013–2015	Sturm Graz	54	(13)
2014–2015	Sturm Graz (A)	2	(1)
2015–2017	SKN St. Pölten	13	(0)
Total		182	(41)

International career
	Austria U17	12	(3)
	Austria U18	3	(0)
2005–2007	Austria U19	14	(4)
2008	Austria U20	4	(0)
2008–2009	Austria U21	3	(2)
2009–2010	Austria	5	(0)

Managerial career
- 2017–2020: JAZ GU-Süd
- 2024–2026: FC Liefering
- 2026: Red Bull Salzburg
- * Club domestic league appearances and goals

Daniel Beichler (born 13 October 1988) is an Austrian professional football manager and former player who played as a striker in Austria and Germany and represented the Austria national team. He is currently the manager of KV Kortrijk.

== Club career ==
Beichler began his football career as a child at SV Grambach. In 1995 he moved to the U-8 youth team of Sturm Graz. He played for Sturm Graz II and in 2007 on loan for Reggina Calcio. He did not make any Serie A appearances. In 2007 SK Sturm brought him back to Graz. Beichler made his debut in the Austrian Bundesliga on 24 November 2007 against SCR Altach. He came on as a substitute for Mario Haas in the 86th minute he scored his first Bundesliga goal. On 19 July 2010, Beichler signed a four-year contract with German Bundesliga relegated team Hertha BSC. During the winter break of the 2010–11 season he moved to Swiss club St. Gallen on loan.

At the beginning of the 2011–12 season, Beichler was loaned to MSV Duisburg in the 2. Bundesliga for one year. After the end of this loan he went on loan from Hertha BSC to SV Ried. He returned to Hertha BSC for the 2021–13 season At the end of January 2013, Beichler was loaned out to SV Sandhausen until the end of the 2012–13 season in order to gain more match practice.

After three years playing in Germany, Beichler returned to Austria in 2013 to sign a two-year contract with Sturm Graz. He joined SKN St. Pölten in the Austrian Football First League for the start of the 2015–16 season. In July 2017, Beichler announced the end of his career as a professional footballer due to knee problems.

== International career ==
Beichler played for Austria's U17, U18, U19, U20 and U21 teams. On 18 March 2009, he was called up to the Austria national team squad for the World Cup qualifier against Romania for the first time.

He made his debut in this match on 1 April 2009. He played five matches for Austria.

== Managerial career ==
From January 2017, Daniel Beichler worked as a trainer in the youth sector. He coached at the youth level at JAZ GU-Süd, the Styrian cooperation club of FC Red Bull Salzburg. In July 2020 he joined FC Red Bull Salzburg. There he worked as a youth coach. From July 2022 he trained the U-18 team at the Salzburg Academy. In April 2024, Beichler became caretaker manager of FC Liefering until the end of the season. Because Cinel stayed in the staff of Red Bull Salzburg, Beichler was promoted to head coach of FC Liefering. In April 2025, Beichler led FC Red Bull Salzburg's U19 team to the UEFA Youth League Final Four.

On 18 February 2026, he was appointed manager of Red Bull Salzburg. At the time of his takeover, the "Bulls" were tied for first place with LASK. Under Beichler's leadership Salzburg finished third place. His tenure ended in May 2026 after 14 games in charge.

On 7 October 2026, it was announced that he would become the new manager of Belgian side KV Kortrijk.

== Career statistics ==
=== Club ===
Appearances and goals by club, season and competition
Club	Season	League			National cup (Note: Includes Austrian Cup, DFB-Pokal)		Continental		Total		Ref.
Club	Season	Division	Apps	Goals	Apps	Goals	Apps	Goals	Apps	Goals	Ref.
Sturm Graz	2006–07	Austrian Bundesliga	2	0	0	0	—		2	0	
Sturm Graz	2007–08	Austrian Bundesliga	6	1	—		—		6	1	
Sturm Graz	2008–09	Austrian Bundesliga	27	9	4	3	4 (Note: Three appearances and one goal in UEFA Intertoto Cup, one appearance in UEFA Cup)	1	35	13	
Sturm Graz	2009–10	Austrian Bundesliga	29	11	6	1	11 (Note: Appearance(s) in UEFA Europa League)	4	46	16	
Sturm Graz	Total		64	21	10	4	15	5	89	30	—
Hertha BSC II	2010–11	Regionalliga Nord	4	1	—		—		4	1	
Hertha BSC II	2012–13	Regionalliga Nordost	3	1	—		—		3	1	
Hertha BSC II	Total		7	2	0	0	0	0	7	2	—
Hertha BSC	2010–11	2. Bundesliga	0	0	0	0	—		0	0	
Hertha BSC	2012–13	2. Bundesliga	1	0	0	0	—		1	0	
Hertha BSC	Total		1	0	0	0	0	0	1	0	—
St. Gallen (loan)	2010–11	Swiss Super League	7	0	0	0	—		7	0	
MSV Duisburg (loan)	2011–12	2. Bundesliga	1	0	1	0	—		2	0	
SV Ried (loan)	2011–12	Austrian Bundesliga	26	4	4	0	0	0	30	4	
SV Sandhausen (loan)	2012–13	2. Bundesliga	7	0	0	0	—		7	0	
Sturm Graz	2013–14	Austrian Bundesliga	33	10	4	0	1	0	38	10	
Sturm Graz	2014–15	Austrian Bundesliga	21	3	3	2	—		24	5	
Sturm Graz	Total		54	13	7	2	1	0	62	15	—
Sturm Graz (A)	2014–15	Austrian Regional League Central	2	1	—		—		2	1	
SKN St. Pölten	2015–16	First League	13	0	2	0	—		15	0	
Career total			182	41	24	6	16	5	222	52	—

=== International ===
Appearances and goals by national team and year
National team	Year	Apps	Goals
Austria	2009	4	0
Austria	2010	1	0
Total		5	0

=== Managerial ===
As of match played 17 May 2026

Managerial record by team and tenure
Team	From	To	Record				
Team	From	To	P	W	D	L	Win %
FC Liefering	16 April 2024	17 February 2026	52	20	14	18	38.5
Red Bull Salzburg	18 February 2026	30 June 2026	14	4	3	7	28.6
KV Kortrijk	7 October 2026	Now	0	0	0	0	
Total			66	24	17	25	36.4
