= Marcel Ziemer =

German former professional footballer (born 1985)

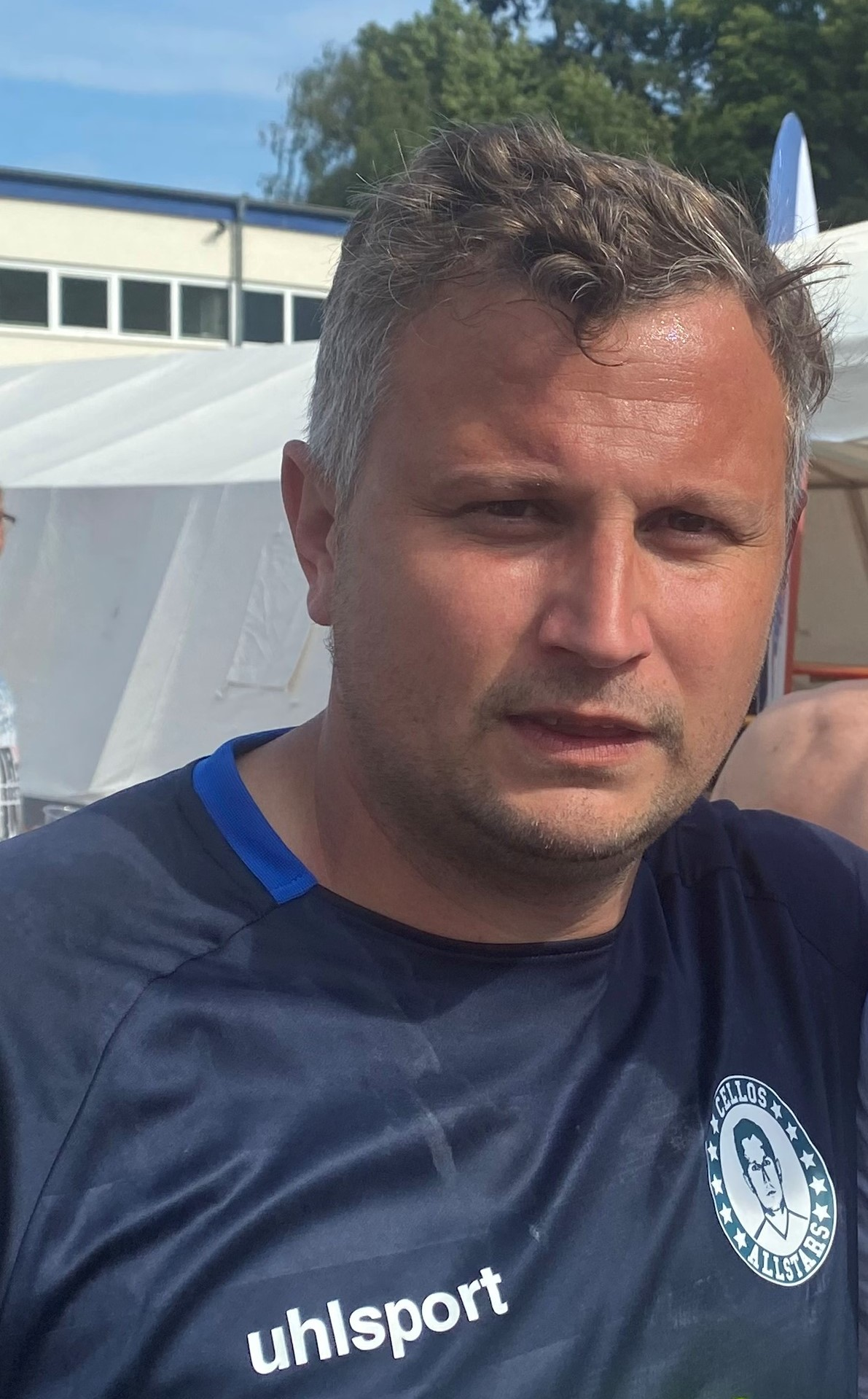
- Ziemer in 2023

Personal information
- Date of birth: 3 August 1985 (age 41)
- Place of birth: Worms, West Germany
- Height: 1.82 m (6 ft 0 in)
- Position: Forward

Team information
- Current team: TSG Pfeddersheim (U15 head coach)

Youth career
- 1993–1994: Kickers Worms
- 1994–2004: TuS Neuhausen

Senior career*
Years	Team	Apps	(Gls)
2004–2008	1. FC Kaiserslautern II	83	(21)
2006–2009	1. FC Kaiserslautern	49	(10)
2009–2011	SV Wehen Wiesbaden	83	(15)
2011–2014	1. FC Saarbrücken	82	(35)
2014–2018	Hansa Rostock	90	(26)
Total		387	(107)

International career
2005	Germany U-20	1	(0)

Managerial career
- 2019–: TSG Pfeddersheim (U15)
- * Club domestic league appearances and goals

Marcel Ziemer (born 3 August 1985) is a German former professional footballer who played as a forward. He is the head coach of TSG Pfeddersheim's U15 team.

== Playing career ==
In 2004, at the age of 18, Ziemer joined 1. FC Kaiserslautern from lower-league club TuS Neuhausen.

In August 2017, in a 3. Liga match against Preußen Münster with Hansa Rostock, Ziemer tore a cruciate ligament. He was released by Rostock when his contract ran out in summer 2018. In January 2019 he was still in physical rehab.

== Coaching career ==
After an anterior cruciate ligament injury, Ziemer left Hansa in the summer 2018. He returned to football in November 2019, when he was hired as head coach of TSG Pfeddersheim's U15 team. Ziemer knew the club's sporting director, Dennis Dell, very well, which was the reason he joined the club.
