= Jan Fießer =

German footballer

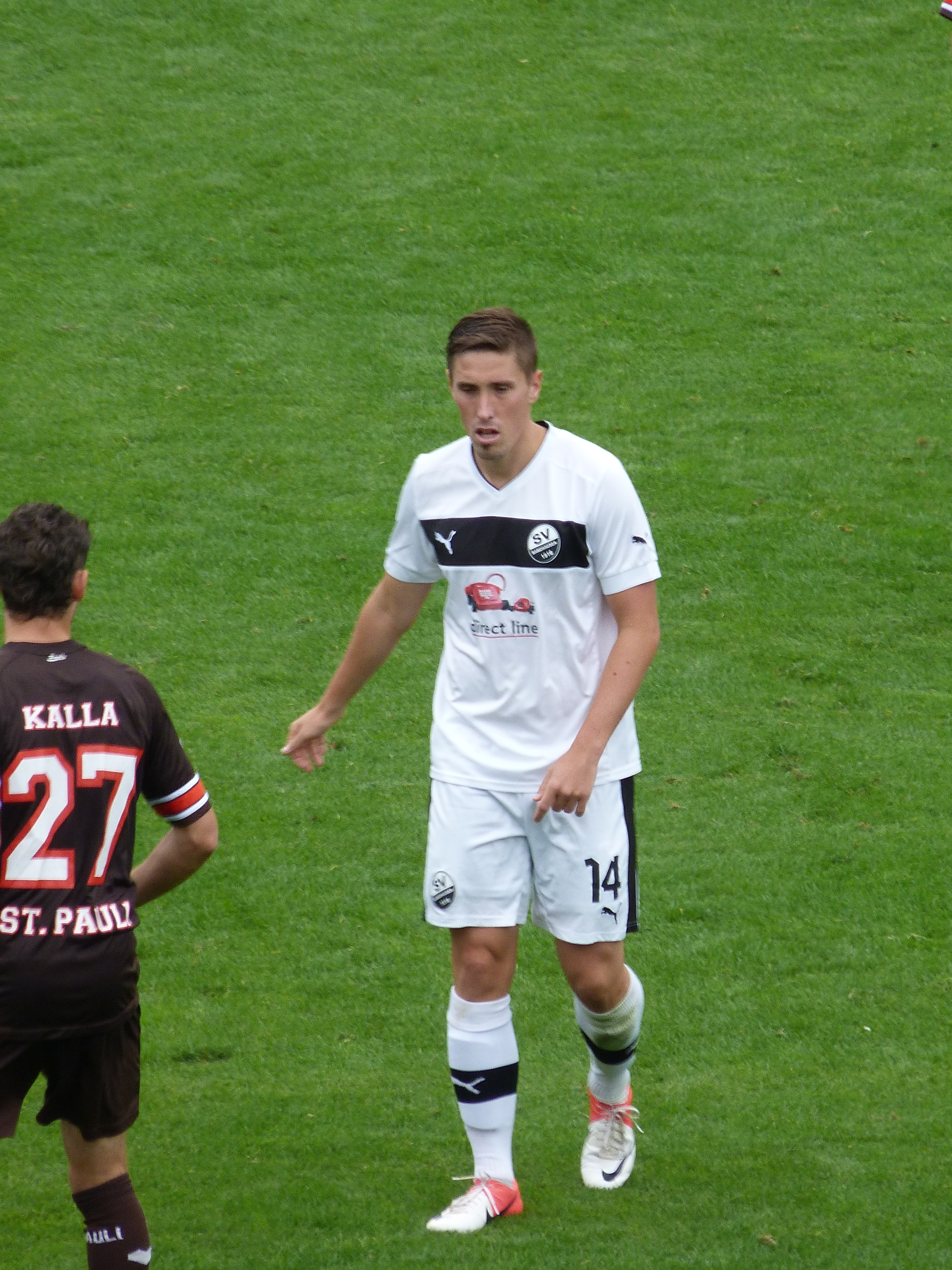

Personal information
- Date of birth: 2 January 1987 (age 39)
- Place of birth: Heidelberg, West Germany
- Height: 1.80 m (5 ft 11 in)
- Position: Defensive midfielder

Team information
- Current team: Eintracht Frankfurt

Youth career
- SpVgg Baiertal
- VfB Wiesloch
- –2002: SV Waldhof Mannheim
- 2002–2006: Eintracht Frankfurt

Senior career*
Years	Team	Apps	(Gls)
2006–2008	KSV Hessen Kassel	61	(3)
2008–2010	SV Sandhausen	44	(4)
2010–2011	SV Wehen Wiesbaden	23	(0)
2011–2013	SV Sandhausen	59	(5)
2013–2014	Arminia Bielefeld	9	(0)
2014–2016	1. FC Saarbrücken	53	(2)
2016–2017	Schalke 04 II	14	(0)
2017	Rot-Weiss Frankfurt	2	(0)

Managerial career
- 2017-2018: Eintracht Frankfurt U17 (assistant)
- 2018: Eintracht Frankfurt U19 (assistant)
- 2018-2019: Eintracht Frankfurt U17 (assistant)
- 2019-2020: Eintracht Frankfurt U17
- 2020-2022: Vitesse Arnhem (assistant)
- 2022-2024: VfL Bochum (assistant)
- 2024-: Eintracht Frankfurt (assistant)
- * Club domestic league appearances and goals as of 20 June 2015

Jan Fießer (born 2 January 1987) is a German football manager and former player. He is currently assistant coach of the Bundesliga club Eintracht Frankfurt.
