= Andrew Wooten =

American soccer player (born 1989)

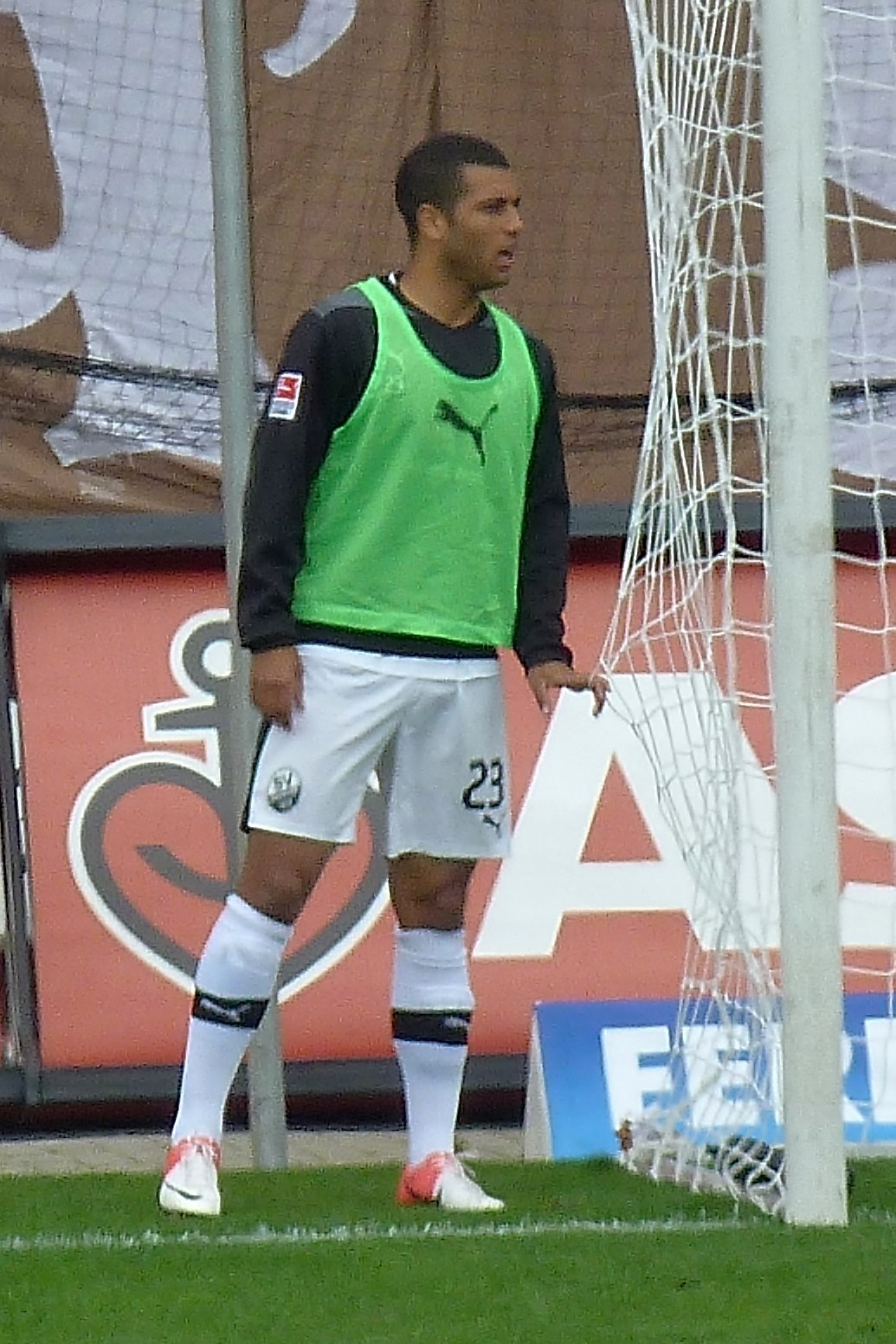
- Wooten with Sandhausen in 2012

Personal information
- Date of birth: September 30, 1989 (age 37)
- Place of birth: Bamberg, West Germany
- Height: 1.86 m (6 ft 1 in)
- Position: Forward

Team information
- Current team: VfR Mannheim

Senior career*
Years	Team	Apps	(Gls)
2008–2009	Wormatia Worms	26	(3)
2009–2014	1. FC Kaiserslautern II	80	(43)
2012–2014	1. FC Kaiserslautern	12	(1)
2012–2013	→ SV Sandhausen (loan)	28	(7)
2014	→ FSV Frankfurt (loan)	14	(4)
2014–2019	SV Sandhausen	133	(41)
2019–2020	Philadelphia Union	23	(0)
2021	Admira Wacker	19	(3)
2021–2022	VfL Osnabrück	17	(0)
2022–2024	Preußen Münster	42	(18)
2024–	VfR Mannheim	28	(12)

International career^{‡}
2015	United States	1	(0)
- * Club domestic league appearances and goals as of March 2, 2025 ‡ National team caps and goals as of June 20, 2019

Andrew Wooten (born September 30, 1989) is a professional soccer player who plays as a forward for VfR Mannheim. Born in Germany, he represented the United States at international level.

== Club career ==
=== 1. FC Kaiserslautern ===
In 2009, Wooten signed with 1. FC Kaiserslautern II. He made his debut for the first team in 2012.

==== Loan to SV Sandhausen ====
Wooten joined SV Sandhausen on loan for the 2012–13 season, where he scored 7 goals in the 2. Bundesliga.

==== Loan to FSV Frankfurt ====
In 2014, Wooten joined FSV Frankfurt on a short-term loan.

=== SV Sandhausen ===
In June 2014, Wooten was permanently transferred to SV Sandhausen signing a three-year contract with them until 2017.

=== Philadelphia Union ===
On June 20, 2019, Wooten signed a contract with the Philadelphia Union following the expiry of his previous contract with SV Sandhausen. Wooten's contract option was declined by Philadelphia following their 2020 season.

=== Admira Wacker ===
On 20 January 2021, Wooten signed with Austrian club Admira Wacker.

=== VfL Osnabrück ===
In June 2021 it was announced that Wooten would join VfL Osnabrück, newly relegated to the 3. Liga for the 2021–22 season.

== International career ==
The son of a German mother and an American serviceman, Wooten is eligible for both Germany and the United States national teams. He has been called into a camp with the United States U-23 squad, but did not make an appearance at the youth level. Wooten received his first call up to the United States for a friendly against Peru on September 4, 2015 and made his debut as a substitute in a friendly match against Costa Rica on October 13, 2015.

== Honors ==
Philadelphia Union

- Supporters Shield: 2020

Preußen Münster

- Regionalliga West: 2022–23
