= Daniel Schulz =

German footballer

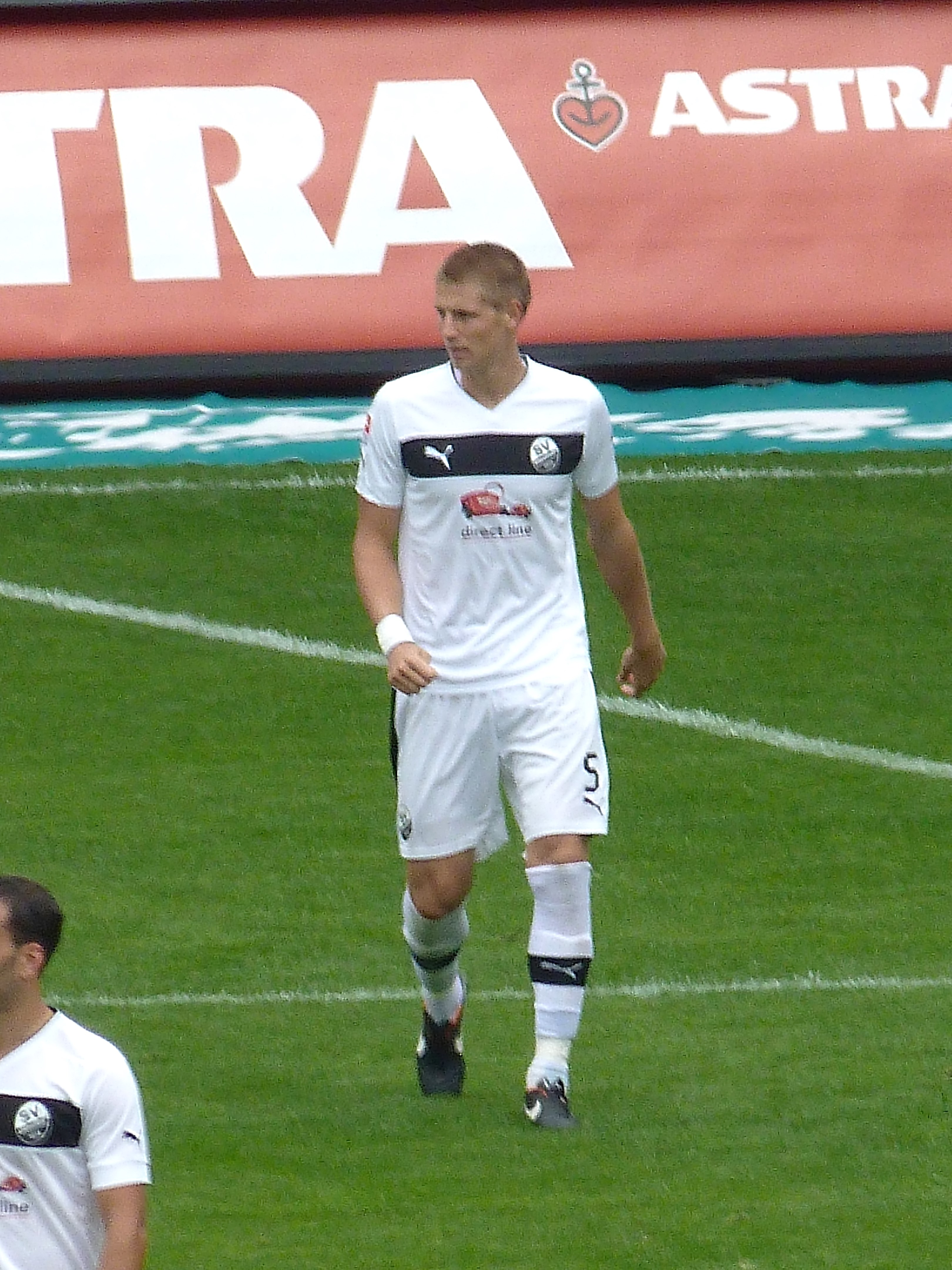

Personal information
- Date of birth: 21 February 1986 (age 40)
- Place of birth: Berlin, Germany
- Height: 1.91 m (6 ft 3 in)
- Position: Defender

Team information
- Current team: Union Berlin (youth coach)

Youth career
- VfB Friedrichshain
- Berolina Stralau
- Berliner FC Dynamo

Senior career*
Years	Team	Apps	(Gls)
–2004	1. FC Union Berlin II		
2004–2010	1. FC Union Berlin	79	(12)
2010–2016	SV Sandhausen	133	(3)
2016–2017	Stuttgarter Kickers	27	(2)
2017–2018	Viktoria Berlin	12	(1)

International career
	Germany U-21	2	(0)

Managerial career
- 2018–: Union Berlin (youth)
- * Club domestic league appearances and goals

Daniel Schulz (born 21 February 1986 in Berlin) is a retired German footballer who currently works as a youth coach at Union Berlin.
