= Tim Stegerer =

German footballer

Personal information
- Date of birth: 18 July 1988 (age 38)
- Place of birth: Saarbrücken, West Germany
- Positions: Defender; midfielder

Team information
- Current team: FC Homburg
- Number: 6

Youth career
- –2008: VfR Saarbrücken
- 2008–2012: SV Auersmacher

Senior career*
| Years | Team | Apps | (Gls) |
| 2012–2014 | 1. FC Saarbrücken | 64 | (2) |
| 2014– | FC Homburg | 268 | (14) |
- * Club domestic league appearances and goals as of 29 April 2024

Tim Stegerer (born 18 July 1988) is a German footballer who plays for FC Homburg in the Regionalliga Südwest.

== Career ==
Stegerer began his career with 1. FC Saarbrücken. He signed for the club in July 2012, and made his 3. Liga debut in a 1–0 win over VfB Stuttgart II. After Saarbrücken were relegated at the end of the 2013–14 season, he left the club, signing for FC Homburg.
