= Kim Falkenberg =

German footballer

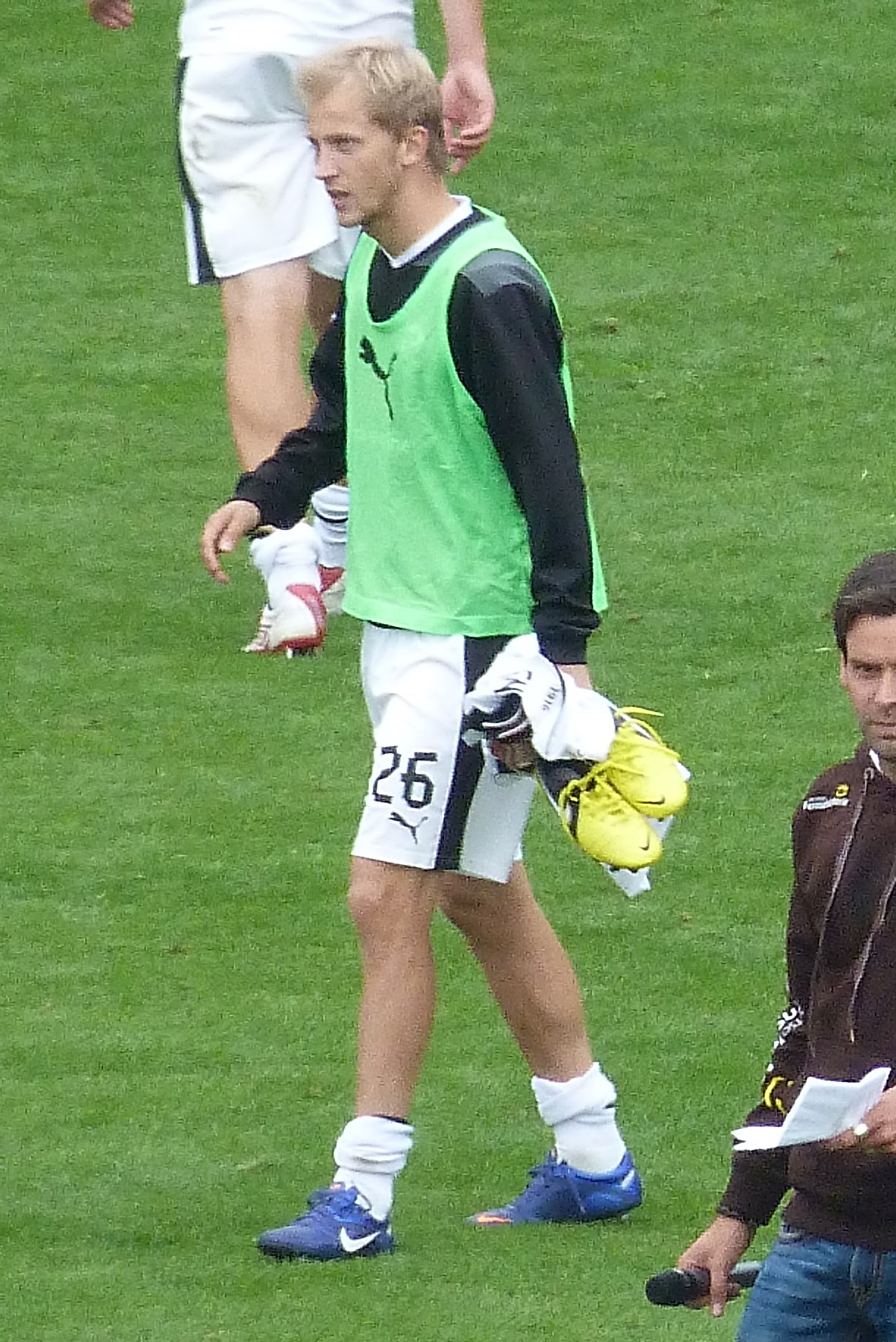
- Falkenberg in 2012

Personal information
- Date of birth: 10 April 1988 (age 38)
- Place of birth: Engelskirchen, West Germany
- Height: 1.79 m (5 ft 10 in)
- Position: Defender

Youth career
- 1994–2000: SSV 08 Bergneustadt
- 2000–2007: Bayer Leverkusen

Senior career*
Years	Team	Apps	(Gls)
2007–2008	Bayer Leverkusen II	39	(1)
2008–2009	→ Rot-Weiß Oberhausen (loan)	29	(1)
2009–2011	Greuther Fürth	41	(0)
2011–2012	Alemannia Aachen	18	(0)
2012–2013	SV Sandhausen	18	(0)
2013–2014	1. FC Saarbrücken	22	(0)
2014–2018	VfL Osnabrück	45	(0)
2014–2015	→ VfL Osnabrück II	7	(0)
Total		219	(2)

International career
2006	Germany U18		
2007	Germany U19		
2008	Germany U20	4	(0)
- * Club domestic league appearances and goals

Kim Falkenberg (born 10 April 1988) is a German former professional footballer who played as a defender.

== Career ==
Born in Engelskirchen, Falkenberg began his career with SSV 08 Bergneustadt and was scouted in summer 2000 by Bayer 04 Leverkusen. At the "Werksclub" he played seven years for the youth teams. In 2007, Falkenberg was promoted to the reserve squad of Bayer 04 Leverkusen and was, after a successful season, loaned to Rot-Weiß Oberhausen on 6 June 2008.

He made his debut on the professional league level in the 2. Bundesliga for Rot-Weiß Oberhausen on 17 August 2008 when he started in a game against TuS Koblenz. He signed on 6 April 2009 a two-year contract with SpVgg Greuther Fürth.

At the end of the 2017–18 Falkenberg retired from professional football.
