= TSG Pfeddersheim =

German football club

- Full name: Turn- und Sportgemeinde Pfeddersheim Fußball e.V. von 1982
- Founded: 1982
- Ground: Uwe-Becker-Stadion
- Capacity: 3,000
- Chairman: Heinz Ueberschär
- Manager: Daniel Wilde
- League: Oberliga Rheinland-Pfalz/Saar (V)
- 2018–19: 3rd
Home colours	Away colours

TSG Pfeddersheim is a German association football club from the Pfeddersheim suburb of Worms, Rhineland-Palatinate.

The club's most notable achievement has been to qualify for the first round of the DFB-Pokal on six occasions, in 1989–90, 1993–94, 1995–96, 1996–97, 2000–01 and 2013–14.

== History ==
The club was formed in 1982, when the football department of the multi-sports club TSG Pfeddersheim, formed in 1886, left the mother club. TSG Pfeddersheim Fußball, as the new club was officially called, won promotion to the tier-four Verbandsliga Südwest, the highest league of the Southwest football federation. In this league too, TSG achieved good results. Their performance culminated in a league championship in 1992 and promotion to the third division Oberliga Südwest.

Pfeddersheim spent the next eight seasons in the Oberliga, and achieved good results in the first four seasons. It missed out on qualifying for the new Regionalligas in 1994, the new third tier of the German league system, but finished an excellent third in the league in 1996. After this result the club declined and TSG was relegated again from the Oberliga in 2000. TSG was unable to recover, instead suffering another drop in 2002, now to the Landesliga, where it was relegated from too in 2003.

After an absence of seven seasons the club was back in the Verbandsliga in 2009, becoming an upper table side once more. Another league title in 2012 took the team up to the Oberliga once more which had now been renamed Oberliga Rheinland-Pfalz/Saar.

The club plays its home games at the Uwe-Becker-Stadion, which holds 3,000.

=== DFB-Pokal ===
The club has made it to the first round of the DFB-Pokal, Germany's national cup competition, on six occasions. In 1989–90 the team defeated VfB Gaggenau 2–0 in the first round to lose to Kickers Offenbach 1–3 in the second. Its second appearance, in 1993–94, saw the club receive a bye in the first round, defeating Greifswalder SC 2–0 and losing to MSV Duisburg 1–3 in extra time.

In the 1995–96 edition TSG drew Borussia Dortmund at home as its opposition in the first round, the current German champions at the time. The amateur club managed to hold Dortmund to a one all draw but lost 3–4 on penalties in front of 25,500. Its fourth appearance, in 1996–97, saw Pfeddersheim draw FSV Zwickau in the first round and exiting after a 1–2 loss. The club's fifth appearance in the German Cup ended in a 0–7 loss to TSV 1860 Munich on 27 August 2000.

After the club's sixth South West Cup triumph in 2013 the team qualified for the first cup round once more, losing to SpVgg Greuther Fürth on 2 August 2013 in the first round of the 2013–14 DFB-Pokal.

== Honours ==
The club's honours:

=== League ===
- Verbandsliga Südwest (VI)
  - Champions: 1992, 2012
  - Runners-up: 1991
- Landesliga Südwest-Ost
  - Runners-up: 2009
- Bezirksliga Rheinhessen
  - Champions: 2007
  - Runners-up: 2005

=== Cup ===
- South West Cup (Tiers III-VII)
  - Winners: 1989, 1993, 1995, 1996, 2000, 2013

== Recent seasons ==
The recent season-by-season performance of the club:

Season	Division	Tier	Position
1999–2000	Oberliga Südwest	IV	17th ↓
2000–01	Verbandsliga Südwest	V	7th
2001–02	Verbandsliga Südwest	V	16th ↓
2002–03	Landesliga Südwest-Ost	VI	14th ↓
2003–04	Bezirksliga Rheinhessen	VII	
2004–05	Bezirksliga Rheinhessen	VII	2nd
2005–06	Bezirksliga Rheinhessen	VII	6th
2006–07	Bezirksliga Rheinhessen	VII	1st ↑
2007–08	Landesliga Südwest-Ost	VI	3rd
2008–09	Landesliga Südwest-Ost	VII	2nd ↑
2009–10	Verbandsliga Südwest	VI	4th
2010–11	Verbandsliga Südwest	VI	3rd
2011–12	Verbandsliga Südwest	VI	1st ↑
2012–13	Oberliga Rheinland-Pfalz/Saar	V	11th
2013–14	Oberliga Rheinland-Pfalz/Saar	V	7th
2014–15	Oberliga Rheinland-Pfalz/Saar	V	3rd
2015–16	Oberliga Rheinland-Pfalz/Saar	V	6th
2016–17	Oberliga Rheinland-Pfalz/Saar	V	11th
2017–18	Oberliga Rheinland-Pfalz/Saar	V	12th
2018–19	Oberliga Rheinland-Pfalz/Saar	V	3rd

- With the introduction of the Regionalligas in 1994 and the 3. Liga in 2008 as the new third tier, below the 2. Bundesliga, all leagues below dropped one tier. In 2012 the Oberliga Südwest was renamed Oberliga Rheinland-Pfalz/Saar.

↑ Promoted	↓ Relegated
