= Sandhausen =

- Municipality
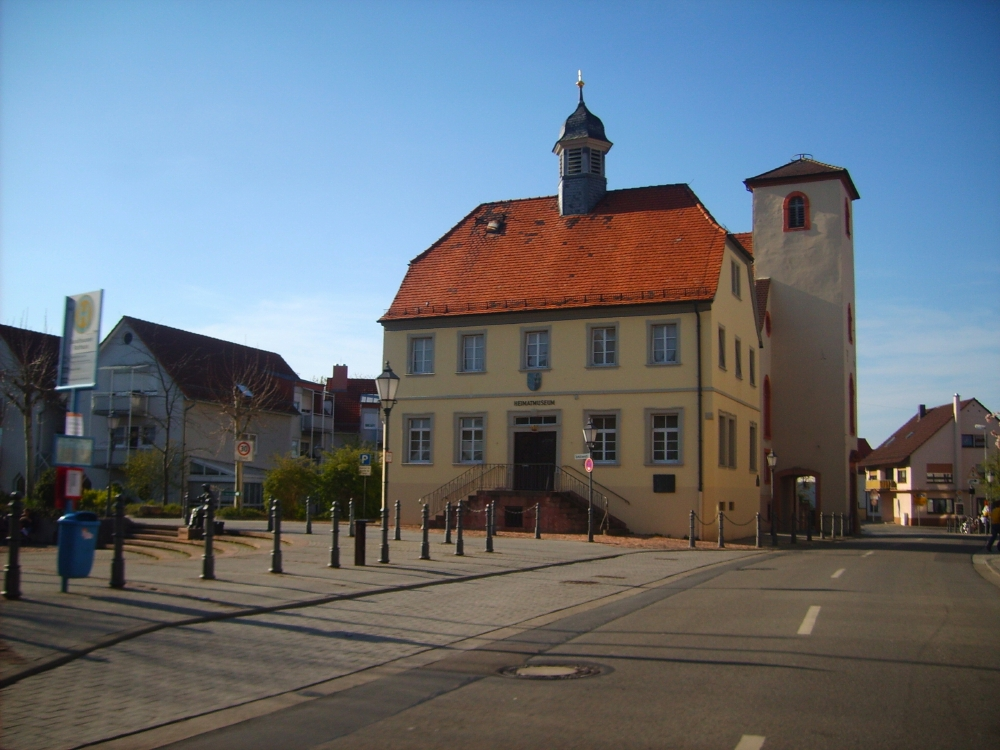
- Old town hall

- Coat of arms

- Location of Sandhausen within Rhein-Neckar-Kreis district
- Interactive map of Sandhausen
- Location within Germany Location within Baden-Württemberg
- Coordinates: 49°20′38″N 08°39′29″E
- Country: Germany
- State: Baden-Württemberg
- Admin. region: Karlsruhe
- District: Rhein-Neckar-Kreis

Government
  - Mayor (2021–29): Hakan Günes (CDU)

Area
  - Total: 14.55 km^{2} (5.62 sq mi)
- Elevation: 107 m (351 ft)

Population (2025-12-31)
  - Total: 15,331
  - Density: 1,054/km^{2} (2,729/sq mi)
- Time zone: UTC+01:00 (CET)
  - Summer (DST): UTC+02:00 (CEST)
- Postal codes: 69207
- Dialling codes: 06224
- Vehicle registration: HD
- Website: www.sandhausen.de

Sandhausen (German pronunciation: [zantˈhaʊ̯zn̩]) is a municipality in the district of Rhein-Neckar-Kreis, in Baden-Württemberg, Germany. It is situated 7 km (4.3 mi) south of Heidelberg.

== Geography ==
=== Location ===
Sandhausen belongs to the Rhein-Neckar Metropolitan region. It is known for its sand dune.

== History ==
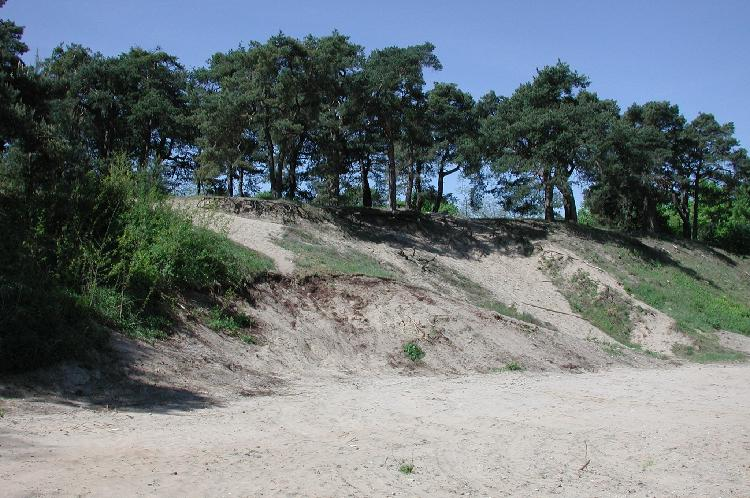
The sand dune in Sandhausen

The first recorded mention of Sandhausen (or "Santhusen") was in 1262; 764 years ago. Sandhausen is named after the ice-age sand dunes that border the municipality. As early as Roman times, a settlement called "Lochheim" existed in the area.

It was part of Bishopric of Speyer till 1262, when Otto von Bruchsal gave it to Ludwig II, Electoral Palatin. It was part of Oberamt Heidelberg in 1351. It was sacked by Baden and Württemberg troops in the Mainz Diocesan Feud in 1462.

It was again sacked by Spanish troops during the Thirty Years' War in 1622 and by French troops during the Nine Years' War in 1688. French troops remained in Sandhausen until 1697. After the death of Maximilian III, Elector of Bavaria, head of the Bavarian branch of the House of Wittelsbach, Charles Theodore, County Palatine of Rhine, inherited Bavaria in 1777 and the territories of the House of Wittelsbach were united under its Palatinate branch.

Thus, Sandhausen became part of Bavaria. It was occupied by French troops in 1795 and was awarded to the Grand Duchy of Baden after German mediatization in 1803.

== Politics ==
=== Municipal Council ===
Municipal Council 2014
Party	Votes	Seats
CDU	38.6 %	8
SPD	30.4 %	7
FDP	17.3 %	4
Greens	13.7 %	3
Voter Participation: 49.5%

=== Mayor ===
The mayor of Sandhausen is Hakan Günes (CDU). Previous mayors were as follows:

- 1954–1981: Walter Reinhard
- 1981–2005: Erich Bertsch
- 2005–2021: Georg Kletti (CDU)

=== Sister cities ===
- Lège-Cap-Ferret, France, since 1980

== Economy and infrastructure ==
=== Economy ===
In the past, hops were grown in Sandhausen. The tobacco industry, which thrived in Sandhausen in the past, is now restricted to the rural parish of Bruchhausen.

=== Schools ===
Sandhausen has the following schools:

- Theodor Heuss primary school
- Friedrich-Ebert-Hauptschule with Werkrealschule
- Friedrich-Ebert-Gymnasium
- Pestalozzi-Förderschule
- Music school ("Südliche Bergstraße")

== Sport ==
The football club SV Sandhausen plays in the Hardtwaldstadion on the outskirts of the town. The club is considered the second smallest professional football club in Germany (Only have more population than SV Elversberg a Spiesen-Elversberg based team), playing in the third division of the German league since the 2023–24 season.

== Notable people ==
- Markus Friedrich Wendelin (born 1584 in Sandhausen), theologian and educator
