= Thomas Kraus =

German footballer

Personal information
- Date of birth: 5 April 1987 (age 39)
- Place of birth: Bamberg, West Germany
- Height: 1.84 m (6 ft 0 in)
- Position: Forward

Team information
- Current team: SK Rapid (assistant manager)

Youth career
- Eintracht Bamberg
- FC Bamberg
- TSV Burgebrach
- SC Reichmannsdorf
- –2006: 1. FC Sand

Senior career*
Years	Team	Apps	(Gls)
2006–2008	Hertha BSC II	37	(3)
2008–2010	1. FC Köln II	77	(10)
2010–2012	Eintracht Trier	67	(13)
2012–2015	Fortuna Köln	110	(34)
2015–2021	Borussia Mönchengladbach II	166	(45)
2021–2022	1. FC Köln II	21	(2)

Managerial career
- 2015–2021: Mönchengladbach Youth (Assistant)
- 2023: SC Fortuna Köln (Assistant)
- 2023–2025: SK Rapid (Assistant)
- 2026–: Dunajská Streda (Assistant)
- * Club domestic league appearances and goals as of 14:48, 23 February 2022 (UTC)

Thomas Kraus (born 5 April 1987) is a German footballer and assistant manager who is currently assistant manager at DAC 1904 Dunajská Streda .

On 21 November 2023, Kraus was appointed assistant manager at SK Rapid.

Kraus was previously assistant manager at Fortuna Koln.
