= Marco Pischorn =

German footballer

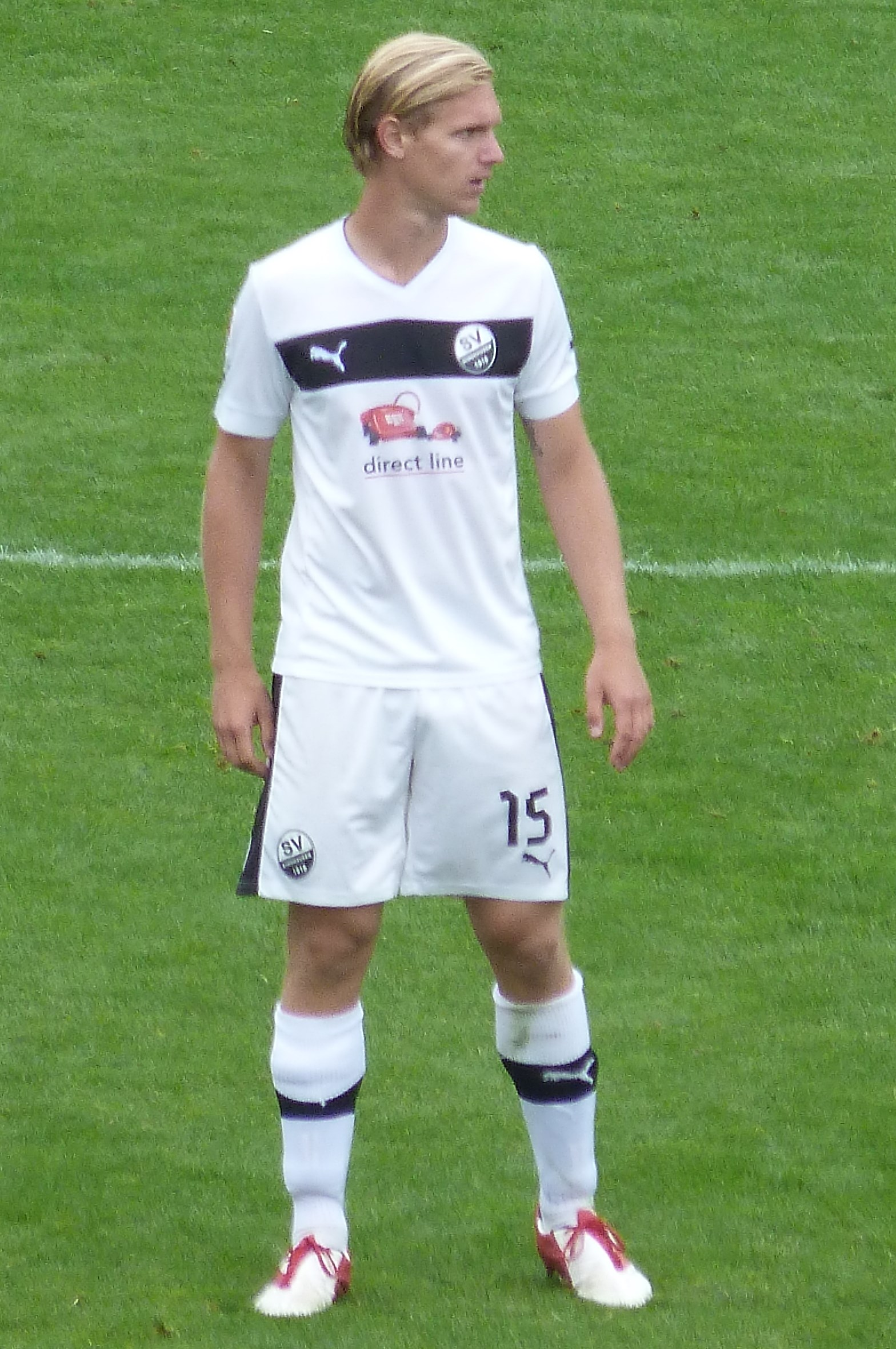
- Marco Pischorn as Player SV Sandhausen

Personal information
- Date of birth: 1 January 1986 (age 40)
- Place of birth: Mühlacker, West Germany
- Height: 1.88 m (6 ft 2 in)
- Position: Defender

Youth career
- –2002: VfR Sersheim
- 2002–2005: FV Löchgau

Senior career*
Years	Team	Apps	(Gls)
2005–2010	VfB Stuttgart II	114	(8)
2007–2009	VfB Stuttgart	4	(0)
2010–2014	SV Sandhausen	99	(12)
2014–2016	Preußen Münster	53	(3)
2016–2019	SGV Freiberg	70	(12)
Total		340	(35)
- * Club domestic league appearances and goals

Marco Pischorn (born 1 January 1986 in Mühlacker) is a German retired football defender.

In October 2007, he was promoted to the first team of VfB Stuttgart. He had his professional debut on 27 October 2007 against Bayer Leverkusen. He left for SV Sandhausen in 2010, where he would spend three and a half years before joining Preußen Münster.
