= Julian Schauerte =

German footballer (born 1988)

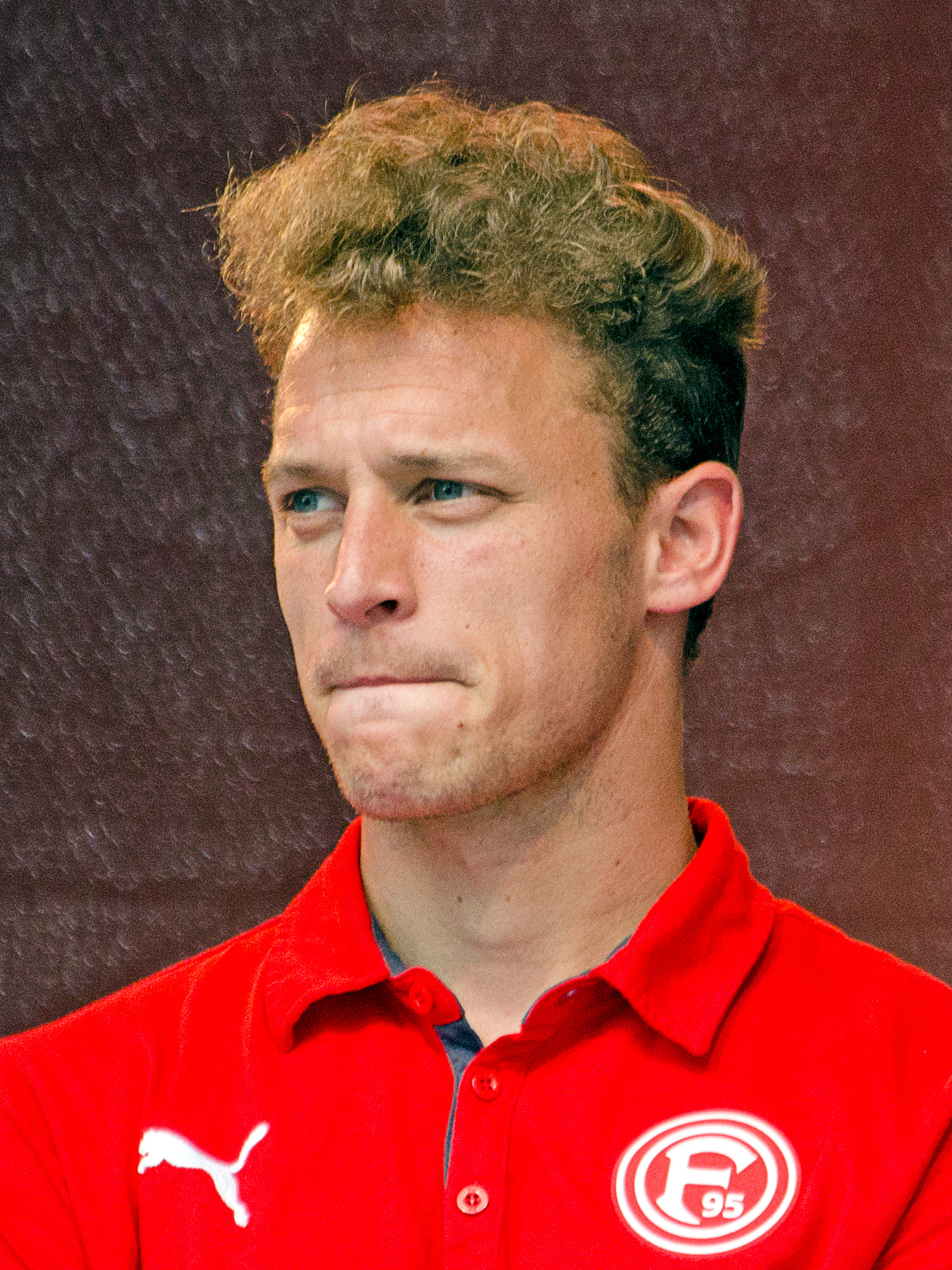
- Schauerte with Fortuna Düsseldorf in 2014

Personal information
- Date of birth: 2 April 1988 (age 38)
- Place of birth: Lennestadt, West Germany
- Height: 1.77 m (5 ft 10 in)
- Position: Right-back

Team information
- Current team: FC Gütersloh
- Number: 6

Youth career
- Grafschaft SC
- –2007: Bayer Leverkusen

Senior career*
| Years | Team | Apps | (Gls) |
| 2007–2009 | Bayer Leverkusen II | 56 | (7) |
| 2009–2014 | SV Sandhausen | 161 | (3) |
| 2014–2018 | Fortuna Düsseldorf | 111 | (1) |
| 2018–2019 | Eupen | 4 | (0) |
| 2019–2022 | Preußen Münster | 110 | (10) |
| 2022–2023 | 1. FC Kaan-Marienborn | 27 | (1) |
| 2023– | FC Gütersloh | 51 | (0) |
- * Club domestic league appearances and goals as of 1 January 2025

Julian Schauerte (born 2 April 1988) is a German professional footballer who plays as a right-back for FC Gütersloh.

== Club career ==
Schauerte comes from Grafschaft a locality in the municipality Schmallenberg. He was born in the neighboring town of Lennestadt and grew up in the town of Schmallenberg. He first played for DJK Grafschaft in the youth before switching to Bayer Leverkusen in 2001.

Schauerte moved to Fortuna Düsseldorf in the 2014–15 season.

In the 2018–19 season, he played for K.A.S. Eupen, a team in the Jupiler Pro League. However, the club announced on 30 May 2019, that they had terminated the contract of the player by mutuel consent.

Seven days later, he signed with SC Preußen Münster for the 2019–20 season.
