= Hardtwaldstadion =

Football stadium in Sandhausen, Germany

GP Stadion am Hardtwald
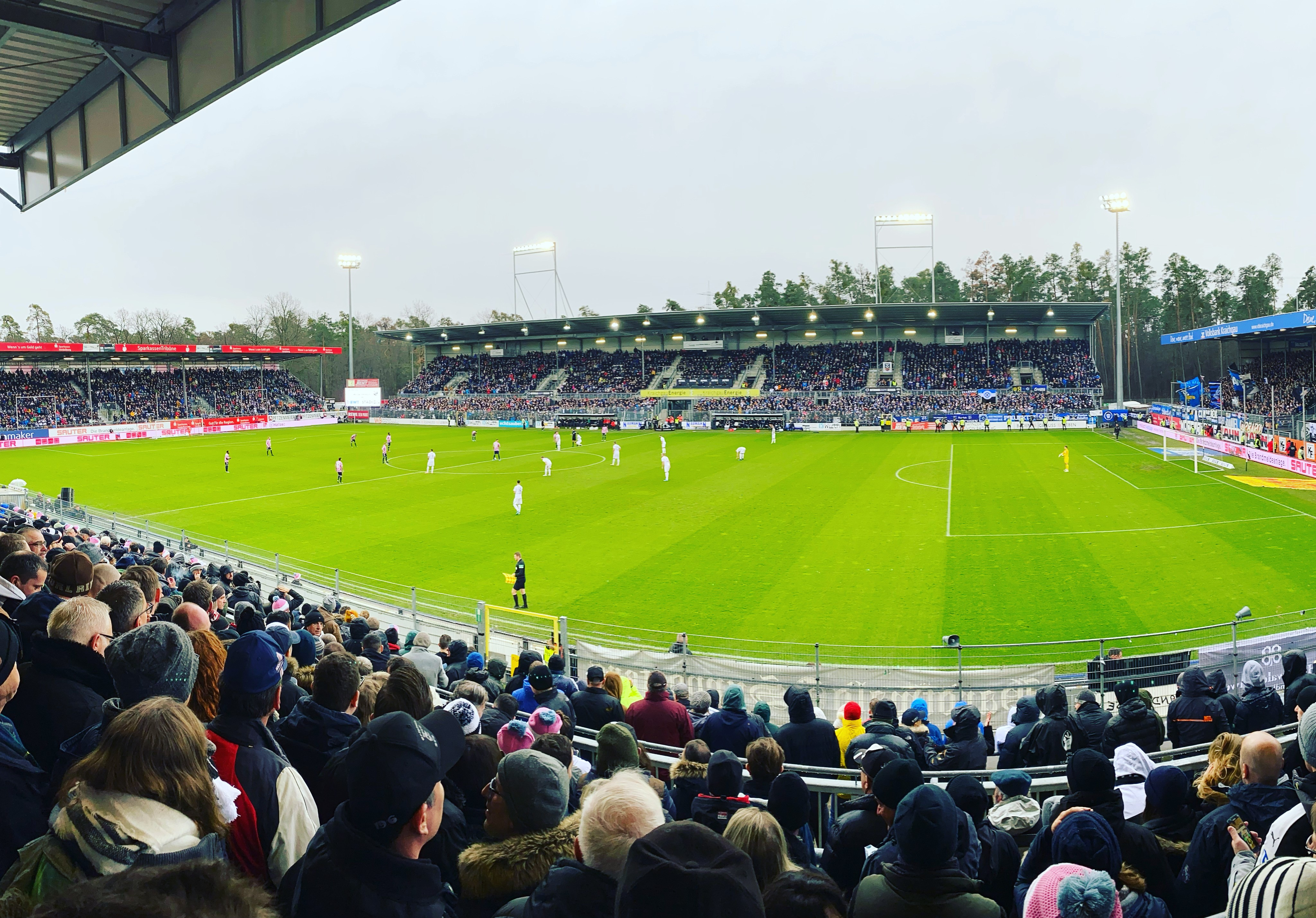
- Hardtwaldstadion (2019)
- Interactive map of GP Stadion am Hardtwald
- Full name: GP Stadion am Hardtwald
- Former names: Hardtwaldstadion (1951–2017); BWT-Stadion am Hardtwald (2017–2023)
- Location: Sandhausen, Germany
- Coordinates: 49°19′56″N 8°38′52″E
- Owner: SV Sandhausen
- Capacity: 15,414 (9,806 standing)
- Surface: grass

Construction
- Opened: 1951
- Renovated: 1987–88, 2002, 2007, 2008
- Expanded: 2012, 2014, 2016

Tenant
- SV Sandhausen (1951–present)

Hardtwaldstadion, currently known as GP Stadion am Hardtwald for sponsorship reasons, is a football stadium in Sandhausen, Germany. Situated in a small patch of forest near the Sandhausen town limits, it is the home stadium of local football team SV Sandhausen. The stadium is owned by the club.

== History ==
The stadium was opened in 1951 and was originally equipped with a clay pitch. A grass pitch was installed in 1961. The structure underwent expansion in 1987/88, when a roofed all-seater main stand was added. Further renovation works were conducted in 2001 with the addition of floodlights and in 2008 with several modifications to meet standards for the 3. Liga. These included adding a temporary stand with a capacity of 2,500, installation of a video scoreboard, expansion of press and police facilities and the building of a VIP house. Afterwards, Hardtwaldstadion could hold 10,231 spectators.

Due to the promotion of the team to 2. Bundesliga, the stadium received some more improvements during 2012 summer break. Among these were under-soil heating, a platform for TV-cameras as well as two new stands, which raised the capacity to about 12.100 spectators. If the team manages to establish itself in 2nd Liga, another two stands have to be added, backing the western goal area and the southern area, to extend the capacity to about 15.000.

In March 2017, BWT, a manufacturer of speciality chemicals and systems for water treatment, acquired the naming rights to the stadium, which was then officially named BWT-Stadion am Hardtwald.

After relegation to the 3. Liga, the contract with BWT was not continued, as the company wanted to realign its sponsorship portfolios. Starting in the 2023–24 season, GP Gölz Paletten GmbH from Zweibrücken became the new name sponsor on a "long-term" contract, so the stadium was officially renamed GP Stadion am Hardtwald.

== See also ==
- List of football stadiums in Germany
- Lists of stadiums
