= Simon Tüting =

German footballer

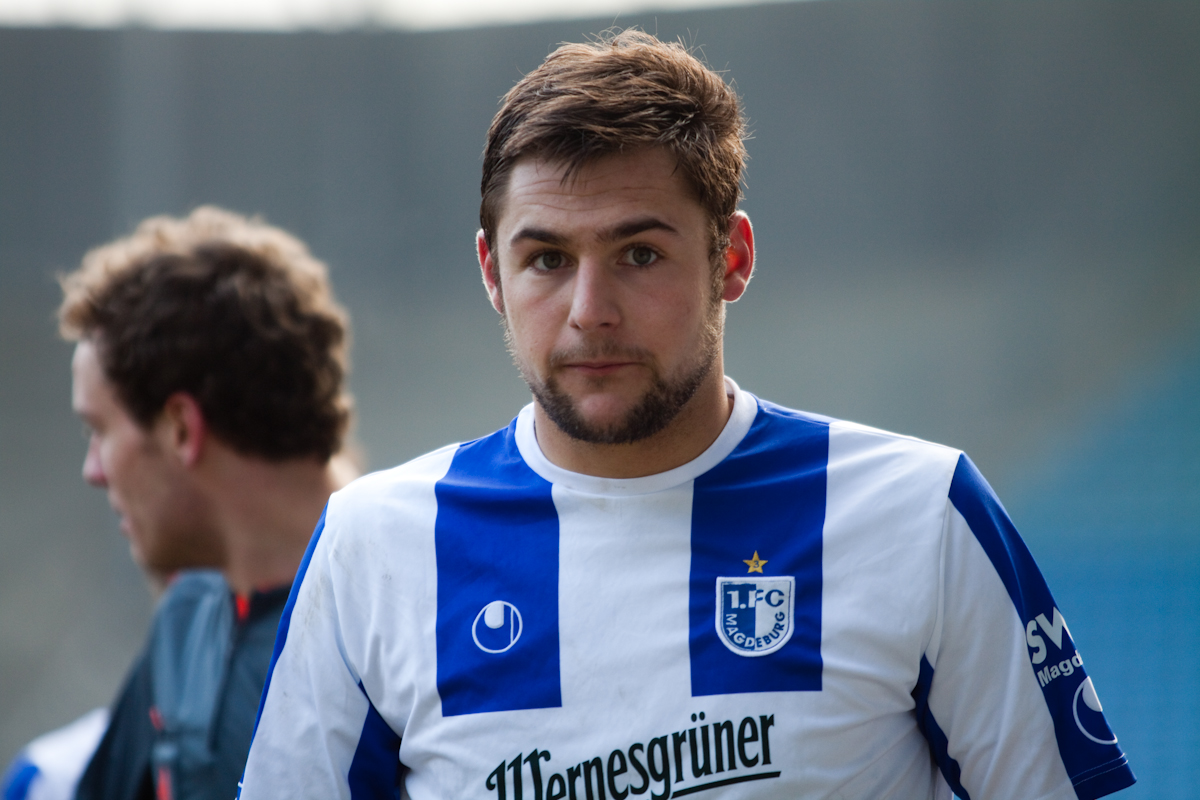
- Tüting in 2010

Personal information
- Date of birth: 7 September 1986 (age 40)
- Place of birth: Bramsche, West Germany
- Height: 1.88 m (6 ft 2 in)
- Position: Midfielder

Youth career
- 1991–2000: SC Achmer
- 2000–2005: VfL Osnabrück

Senior career*
Years	Team	Apps	(Gls)
2005–2007	VfL Osnabrück II	60	(22)
2006–2007	VfL Osnabrück	8	(0)
2007–2009	Hansa Rostock II	45	(23)
2008–2009	Hansa Rostock	6	(0)
2009–2010	1. FC Magdeburg	32	(2)
2011–2012	Chemnitzer FC	54	(9)
2012–2015	SV Sandhausen	46	(3)
2015–2017	VfL Osnabrück	21	(1)
2017–2018	Waldhof Mannheim	25	(2)
Total		297	(62)
- * Club domestic league appearances and goals

Simon Tüting (born 7 September 1986) is a German former professional footballer who played as a midfielder.

== Club career ==
Tüting was born in Bramsche, Lower Saxony. In 2007, he left VfL Osnabrück for then Bundesliga side Hansa Rostock. For Rostock he made one Bundesliga appearance and another five in the 2. Bundesliga after the club was relegated.

On 8 July 2009, 1. FC Magdeburg announced they had signed Tüting on a one-year contract, and he joined Chemnitz eighteen months later. In early February 2015, he returned to VfL Osnabrück after seven and a half years. He joined the club from 2. Bundesliga side SV Sandhausen and signed a contract until 2017.
