= David Ulm =

French footballer (born 1984)

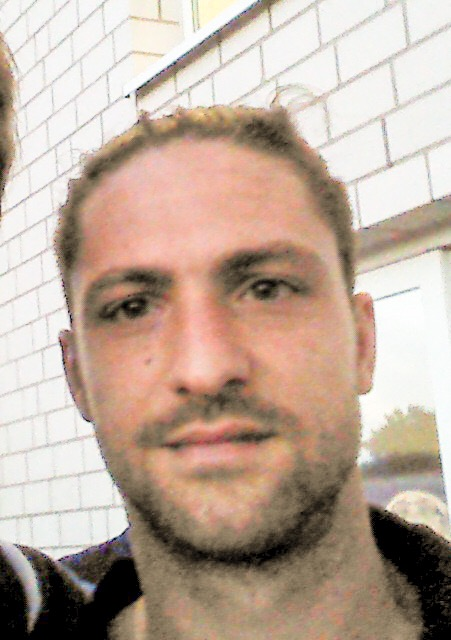
- David Ulm

Personal information
- Date of birth: 30 June 1984 (age 42)
- Place of birth: Wissembourg, France
- Height: 1.74 m (5 ft 9 in)
- Position: Striker

Youth career
- 1998–2003: Strasbourg

Senior career*
| Years | Team | Apps | (Gls) |
| 2000–2005 | Strasbourg | 24 | (1) |
| 2005–2006 | FC Mulhouse | 29 | (7) |
| 2006–2007 | Sportfreunde Siegen | 1 | (0) |
| 2008–2009 | FSV Frankfurt | 23 | (5) |
| 2009 | Kickers Offenbach II | 1 | (0) |
| 2009–2010 | Kickers Offenbach | 32 | (8) |
| 2010–2014 | SV Sandhausen | 110 | (15) |
| 2014–2018 | Arminia Bielefeld | 70 | (13) |
| 2017–2018 | Arminia Bielefeld II | 15 | (4) |
- * Club domestic league appearances and goals as of 10:27, 3 August 2018 (UTC)

David Ulm (born 30 June 1984) is a French footballer who plays as a striker.
