= Timo Achenbach =

German footballer

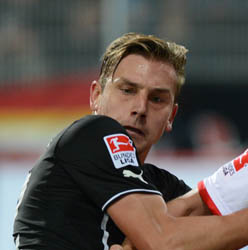
- Timo Achenbach playing for SV Sandhausen

Personal information
- Date of birth: 3 September 1982 (age 44)
- Place of birth: Witten, West Germany
- Height: 1.85 m (6 ft 1 in)
- Position: Defender

Youth career
- 1986–1990: TuS Heven
- 1990–1993: VfL Witten
- 1993–1996: SG Wattenscheid 09
- 1996–2001: Borussia Dortmund

Senior career*
Years	Team	Apps	(Gls)
2001–2003	Borussia Dortmund II	37	(2)
2003–2004	→ VfB Lübeck (loan)	32	(3)
2004–2005	→ 1. FC Köln (loan)	15	(0)
2005–2008	Greuther Fürth	68	(3)
2008–2012	Alemannia Aachen	122	(3)
2012–2015	SV Sandhausen	86	(1)
2015–2018	KFC Uerdingen 05	56	(4)
2018	TuS Ennepetal	0	(0)
Total		416	(16)

International career
2003	Germany U21	3	(0)
2004	Germany B	1	(0)

Managerial career
- 2015–2018: KFC Uerdingen 05 (youth)
- 2018: TuS Ennepetal (assistant)
- 2018–: Borussia Dortmund (youth) (assistant)
- * Club domestic league appearances and goals

Timo Achenbach (born 3 September 1982) is a German former professional footballer who played as a left-sided defender and midfielder.

A youth exponent of Borussia Dortmund, he had loans spells at VfB Lübeck and 1. FC Köln before playing for SpVgg Greuther Fürth, Alemannia Aachen, and SV Sandhausen in the 2. Bundesliga. In 2015 he moved to lower league side KFC Uerdingen 05.

Internationally, he represented Germany playing for the U21 and B teams.

== Career ==
Born in Witten, West Germany, Achenbach started his footballing career as a youth player for teams such as his home team, FSV Witten and other clubs. At the age of fourteen he was scouted by Borussia Dortmund, who signed him and for whom he played for the remainder of his youth career.

The 2002–03 season was a good one for the Dortmund amateur team as they won the league, and Achenbach marked himself out to be a top performer. He was bought by VfB Lübeck for €30,000 in 2003–04, where he proved to be a useful player and was part of the team, but the team was relegated at the end of the season. Once again Achenbach would be loaned, to 1. FC Köln, for the 2004–05 season, where he played in both the first team and in the amateur team in the Northern Regional League.

After a period of switching clubs, Achenbach finished up in SpVgg Greuther Fürth and has since signed a contract keeping him at the club until season 2007–08. In the 2009–10 season at 2. Bundesliga side Alemannia Aachen, Achenbach was attracting attention from clubs worldwide thanks to his prestigious skill, versatility and jinking runs.
