= Frank Löning =

German footballer

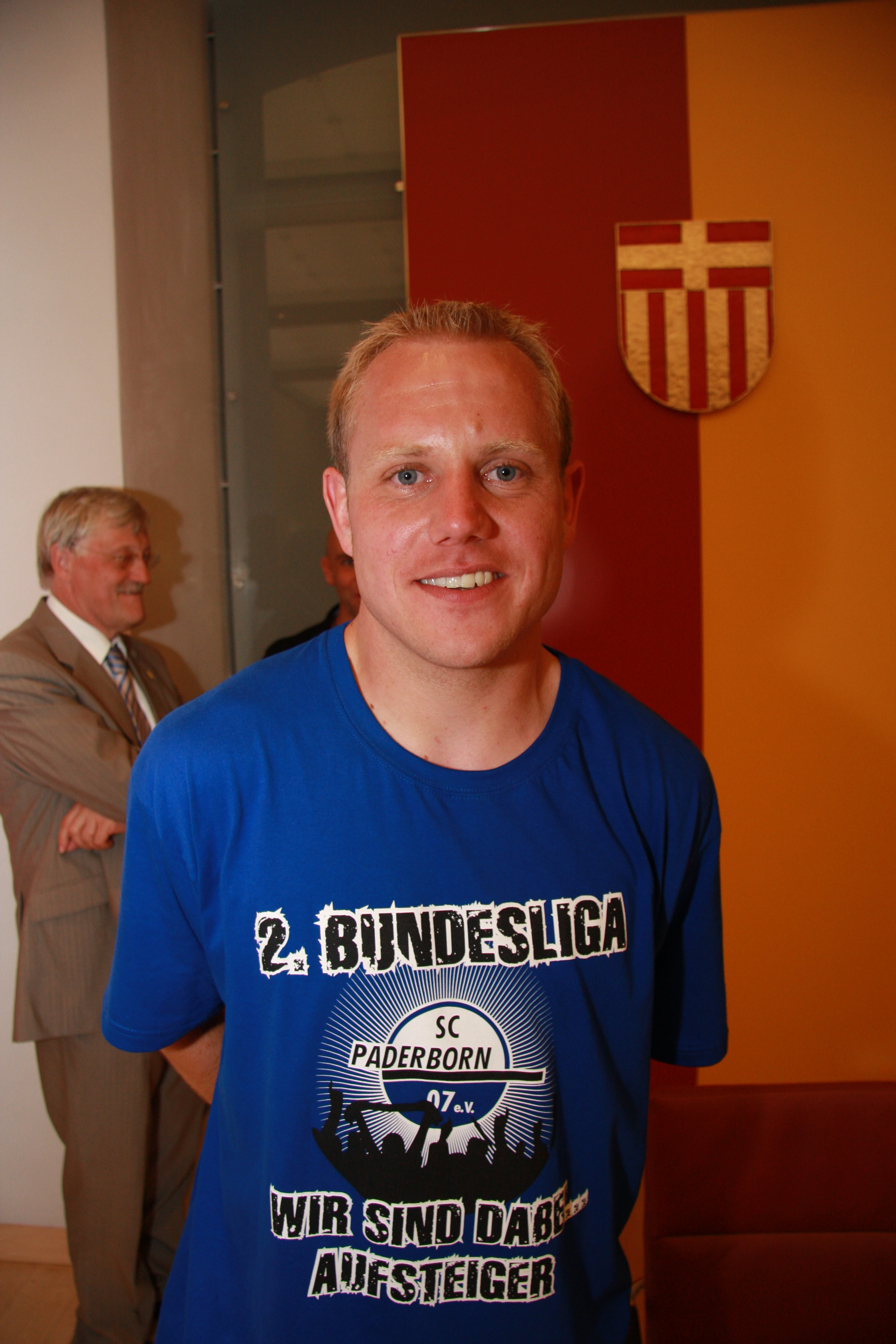
- Löning celebrating SC Paderborn's promotion to the 2. Bundesliga in 2009

Personal information
- Date of birth: 28 August 1981 (age 45)
- Place of birth: Aurich, West Germany
- Height: 1.87 m (6 ft 2 in)
- Position: Striker

Youth career
- SV Wallinghausen
- SpVg Aurich
- –2001: SV Wallinghausen
- 2001–2002: TuS Esens

Senior career*
Years	Team	Apps	(Gls)
2002–2004	Kickers Emden	67	(44)
2004–2006	SV Wilhelmshaven	28	(10)
2006–2008	Werder Bremen II	54	(17)
2007–2008	Werder Bremen	0	(0)
2008–2010	SC Paderborn	65	(17)
2010–2014	SV Sandhausen	112	(38)
2014–2015	Erzgebirge Aue	32	(6)
2015–2016	Chemnitzer FC	29	(6)
2016–2017	Rot-Weiss Essen	31	(8)
Total		418	(146)

Managerial career
- 2023: VfB Oldenburg (interim)
- * Club domestic league appearances and goals

Frank Löning (born 28 August 1981) is a German former professional footballer who played as a forward.

== Club career ==
Löning was born in Aurich. In January 2015, he left 2. Bundesliga side Erzgebirge Aue after one year and joined nearby 3. Liga club Chemnitzer FC. He signed for Chemnitz until summer 2016.

In April 2017, he announced his retirement from professional football citing an unsatisfactory healing process following a heel injury. He agreed to the termination of his contract as of 31 March. In March 2023, he was named interim manager of VfB Oldenburg for one game.
