= 2014–15 SSV Jahn Regensburg season =

Jahn Regensburg
2014–15 season
- Chairman: Hans Rothammer
- Manager: Christian Brand
- Stadium: Jahnstadion, Regensburg, Bavaria
- 3. Liga: 20th (relegated)
- Top goalscorer: League: Aias Aosman (11); All: Aias Aosman (11)
- Highest home attendance: 8,742
- Lowest home attendance: 2,615

The 2014–15 SSV Jahn Regensburg season is the 108th season in the club's football history. In 2014–15, the club played in the 3. Liga, the third tier of German football. This was the last season in the season in the old Jahnstadion, the team's home since 1926. In the next season, Regensburg would play in the new Continental Arena which was built at that time.

== Review and events ==
The club's management was not fully content with the results of manager Thomas Stratos and so his contract was not renewed at the end of the season. The new manager is former TSV 1860 Munich manager Alexander Schmidt.

Jahn Regensburg took part in the 2014–15 Bavarian Cup, where the winner would qualify for the 2015–16 DFB-Pokal. However, they were eliminated in the Round of 16 by SpVgg SV Weiden by a 1–0 deficit.

After six defeats in a row and the subsequent drop to the last place, the manager was heavily criticized. The club's management was convinced that not the manager was to blame for the bad results, but that the available players were not good enough. They signed several new players in October and the team won on matchday 14 against SG Sonnenhof Großaspach, but was not able to leave the last place in the table. After a loss and a draw on matchday 15 and 16, the team lost 4–1 in Chemnitz after a pathetic performance. This led to the suspension of manager Alexander Schmidt. U23 manager Ilija Dzepina and youth coordinator Marcus Jahn managed the team until a new manager was signed. On 18 November 2014, Christian Brand was appointed as new manager of the club. Brand set a new start record for a manager of Jahn Regensburg with five losses in five matches. The club acquired eight new players in the winter transfer window and was able to start the new year with a victory. But the team was not able to leave the last place in the league and relegation to the Regionalliga Bayern was unavoidable already three matchdays before the end of the season.

== Matches ==
=== Legend ===
Win Draw Loss Postponed

=== Friendly matches ===
22 June 2014	1. FC Hersbruck	0–7	Jahn Regensburg	Hersbruck
11:00 CEST		Report (in German)	Muhović 17', 25', 40'Schmid 37'; Aosman 45' (pen.); Rech 65' (pen.); Güntner 75'

24 June 2014	FC Eintracht Bamberg	1–1	Jahn Regensburg	Neustadt an der Donau
18:30 CEST	Görtler 51' (pen.)	Report (in German)	Muhović 40'	Stadium: Anton-Treffer-Stadion

28 June 2014	FC Neufahrn	0–7	Jahn Regensburg	Neufahrn
15:00 CEST		Report (in German)	Schmid 28'; Muhović 34'; Aosman 53', 64'; Michel 55', 77', 80'

29 June 2014	Regional squad	0–11	Jahn Regensburg	Lappersdorf
15:00 CEST		Report (in German)	Lienhard 30'; 37' (o.g.); Geipl 43'; Muhović 53', 55', 72', 87'; Michel 60', 86'; Kurz 71', 81'

3 July 2014	SC Kirchroth	0–15	Jahn Regensburg	Kirchroth
19:00 CEST		Report (in German)	Windmüller 5', 82', 85'; Hein 6'; Schmid 7', 14', 18'; Lienhard 37'; Kurz 47'; Franziskus 55', 58'; Arkadas 61'; Waas 64' (pen.), 68'; Aosman 85'

6 July 2014	Greuther Fürth II	1–3	Jahn Regensburg	Feucht
17:00 CEST	Maderer	Report (in German)	Franziskus 50'; Aosman 56'; Kurz 61' (pen.)

9 July 2014	Jahn Regensburg	2–1	Greuther Fürth	Cadolzburg
17:00 CEST	Aosman 19'; Muhović 83'	Report (in German)	Przybyłko 4'	Stadium: Waldsportanlage

11 July 2014	Jahn Regensburg	2–2	FC Winterthur	Kaufbeuren
17:30 CEST	Franziskus 24'; Lienhard 85'	Report (in German)	Bengondo 58'; Tighazoui 88'	Stadium: Parkstadion Kaufbeuren

14 July 2014	Jahn Regensburg	0–1	FC Hradec Králové	Regensburg
17:00 CEST		Report (in German)	Prokeš 45'	Stadium: Stadion am Kaulbachweg

18 July 2014	Dynamo Budějovice	1–3	Jahn Regensburg	České Budějovice
18:00 CEST	Škoda 81'	Report (in German)	Trettenbach 11'; Herzel 24'; Aosman 57'	Stadium: Střelecký ostrov

10 October 2014	Jahn Regensburg	1–2	Josko Ried	Regensburg
15:30 CEST	Franziskus	Report (in German)	Fröschl 10'; Ziegl 15'	Stadium: Stadion am Kaulbachweg

10 January 2015	FC Bayern Munich II	2–0	Jahn Regensburg	Munich
14:00 CET	Ingmann 60'; Wegkamp 70'	Report (in German)		Stadium: Säbener Str. 51

14 January 2015	SpVgg Greuther Fürth	2–1	Jahn Regensburg	Fürth
15:30 CET	Freis 40'; Lam 69'	Report (in German)	Aosman 33' (pen.)

17 January 2015	SV Sandhausen	4–2	Jahn Regensburg	Sandhausen
14:00 CET	Wooten 8'; Knoll 13'; Hübner 34'; J.-P. Müller 88'	Report (in German)	Hesse 28'; Ramaj 44'	Attendance: 150

22 January 2015	TSV 1860 Munich II	0–4	Jahn Regensburg	Munich
15:00 CET		Report (in German)	Lachheb 34'; Königs 43', 81'; Rech 81'	Attendance: 100

25 January 2015	Stuttgarter Kickers	4–2	Jahn Regensburg	Heiningen
14:00 CET	Calamita 19'; Halimi 24'; Fischer 29'; Engelbrecht 84'	Report (in German)	Geipl 38'; Öztürk 43'	Attendance: 100

27 March 2015	Jahn Regensburg	2–1	Josko Ried	Ried im Innkreis
15:00 CET	Königs 17', 30'	Report (in German)	Elsneg 25' (pen.)	Stadium: Keine Sorgen Arena

=== 3. Liga ===
==== League table ====
Pos	Team	Pld	W	D	L	GF	GA	GD	Pts	Promotion, qualification or relegation
16	Mainz 05 II (Note: Reserve teams are ineligible for promotion or DFB-Pokal qualification.)	38	10	12	16	43	52	−9	42	
17	Hansa Rostock	38	11	8	19	54	68	−14	41	
18	Borussia Dortmund II (R)	38	8	15	15	41	51	−10	39	Relegation to Regionalliga
19	SpVgg Unterhaching (Note: SpVgg Unterhaching were deducted two points for license violation.) (R)	38	11	8	19	51	67	−16	39	Relegation to Regionalliga
20	Jahn Regensburg (R)	38	8	7	23	44	65	−21	31	Relegation to Regionalliga

Source: DFB
Rules for classification: 1) Points; 2) Goal difference; 3) Goals scored
(R) Relegated

==== Matches ====
26 July 2014 1	Jahn Regensburg	3–1	MSV Duisburg	Regensburg
14:00 CEST	Trettenbach 4'; Schmid 14'; Aosman 79'	Report (in German)	Janjić 40' (pen.)	Stadium: Jahnstadion; Attendance: 4,423; Referee: Martin Petersen (Stuttgart)

2 August 2014 2	Stuttgarter Kickers	3–1	Jahn Regensburg	Reutlingen
14:00 CEST	Stein 26'; Badiane 28'; Braun 81'	Report (in German)	Aosman 10'	Stadium: Stadion an der Kreuzeiche; Attendance: 2,765; Referee: Thorsten Schriever (Dorum)

5 August 2014 3	Jahn Regensburg	0–2	SpVgg Unterhaching	Regensburg
19:00 CEST		Report (in German)	Thiel 16'; Widemann 85'	Stadium: Jahnstadion; Attendance: 5,090; Referee: Alexander Sather (Grimma)

9 August 2014 4	Borussia Dortmund II	5–1	Jahn Regensburg	Dortmund
14:00 CEST	Gyau 8', 21'; Harder 20'; Solga 47' (pen.); Maruoka 65'	Report (in German)	Lienhard 34'	Stadium: Stadion Rote Erde; Attendance: 9,999 (sell-out); Referee: Felix-Benjamin Schwermer (Magdeburg)

23 August 2014 5	Jahn Regensburg	4–4	Hansa Rostock	Regensburg
14:00 CEST	Kurz 49'; Aosman 66'; Trettenbach 73'; Dressler 81'	Report (in German)	Ziemer 18', 60', 84', 89'	Stadium: Jahnstadion; Attendance: 3,807; Referee: Robert Schröder (Hanover)

27 August 2014 6	VfB Stuttgart II	1–2	Jahn Regensburg	Aspach
19:00 CEST	Vier 53'	Report (in German)	Aosman 49'; Güntner 57'	Stadium: Mechatronik Arena; Attendance: 850; Referee: Sören Storks (Velen)

30 August 2014 7	Jahn Regensburg	1–1	Energie Cottbus	Regensburg
14:00 CEST	Güntner 64'	Report (in German)	Kleindienst 70'	Stadium: Jahnstadion; Attendance: 3,548; Referee: Florian Heft (Wietmarschen)

6 September 2014 8	Dynamo Dresden	2–1	Jahn Regensburg	Dresden
14:00 CEST	Justin Eilers 14', 79'	Report (in German)	Aosman 32'	Stadium: Stadion Dresden; Attendance: 21,802; Referee: Frank Willenborg (Osnabrück)

13 September 2014 9	Jahn Regensburg	0–1	Preußen Münster	Regensburg
14:00 CET		Report (in German)	Reichwein 73'	Stadium: Jahnstadion; Attendance: 2,798; Referee: Sven Waschitzki (Essen)

20 September 2014 10	Rot-Weiß Erfurt	2–0	Jahn Regensburg	Erfurt
14:00 CEST	Kammlott 63', 71'	Report (in German)		Stadium: Steigerwaldstadion; Attendance: 4,983; Referee: Alexander Sather (Grimma)

24 September 2014 11	Jahn Regensburg	0–2	Holstein Kiel	Regensburg
19:00 CEST		Report (in German)	Heider 65'; Kazior 74'	Stadium: Jahnstadion; Attendance: 2,615; Referee: Robert Kampka (Mainz)

27 September 2014 12	Wehen Wiesbaden	2–0	Jahn Regensburg	Wiesbaden
14:00 CEST	Jänicke 5'; Benyamina 62'	Report (in German)		Stadium: BRITA-Arena; Attendance: 3,500; Referee: Franz Bokop (Vechta)

4 October 2014 13	VfL Osnabrück	2–0	Jahn Regensburg	Osnabrück
14:00 CEST	Kandziora 59'; Menga 90+2'	Report (in German)		Stadium: Osnatel-Arena; Attendance: 7,664; Referee: Daniel Schlager (Niederbühl)

18 October 2014 14	Jahn Regensburg	2–0	SG Sonnenhof Großaspach	Regensburg
14:00 CEST	Franziskus 15'; Kurz 84'	Report (in German)		Stadium: Jahnstadion; Attendance: 2,923; Referee: Thorben Siewer (Drolshagen)

26 October 2014 15	1. FSV Mainz 05 II	0–1	Jahn Regensburg	Mainz
14:00 CET	Roßbach 89'	Report (in German)		Stadium: Stadion am Bruchweg; Attendance: 668; Referee: Sören Storks (Velen)

2 November 2014 16	Jahn Regensburg	1–1	Hallescher FC	Regensburg
14:00 CET	Aosman 76'	Report (in German)	Gogia 72'	Stadium: Jahnstadion; Attendance: 3,772; Referee: Marcel Göpferich (Bad Schönborn)

8 November 2014 17	Chemnitzer FC	4–1	Jahn Regensburg	Chemnitz
14:00 CET	Türpitz 13', 68'; Fink 19', 35'	Report (in German)	Steininger 71'	Stadium: Stadion an der Gellertstraße; Attendance: 5,070; Referee: Patrick Alt (Heusweiler)

22 November 2014 18	Jahn Regensburg	0–1	Arminia Bielefeld	Regensburg
14:00 CET		Report (in German)	Hemlein 37'	Stadium: Jahnstadion; Attendance: 4,070; Referee: Robert Schröder (Hanover)

29 November 2014 19	Fortuna Köln	1–0	Jahn Regensburg	Cologne
14:00 CET	Marquet 27'	Report (in German)		Stadium: Südstadion; Attendance: 1,320; Referee: Malte Dittrich (Bremen)

6 December 2014 20	MSV Duisburg	2–0	Jahn Regensburg	Duisburg
14:00 CET	Gardawski 12'; Onuegbu 48'	Report (in German)		Stadium: Schauinsland-Reisen-Arena; Attendance: 10,081; Referee: Matthias Jöllenbeck (Freiburg)

13 December 2014 21	Jahn Regensburg	0–2	Stuttgarter Kickers	Regensburg
14:00 CET		Report (in German)	Baumgärtel 3'; Stein 75' (pen.)	Stadium: Jahnstadion; Attendance: 2,909; Referee: Christian Bandurski (Oberhausen)

20 December 2014 22	SpVgg Unterhaching	3–2	Jahn Regensburg	Unterhaching
14:00 CET	Hagn 66'; Widemann 72'; Voglsammer 74'	Report (in German)	Windmüller 17'; Steininger 60'	Stadium: Alpenbauer Sportpark; Attendance: 2,000; Referee: Benedikt Kempkes (Kruft)

31 January 2015 23	Jahn Regensburg	3–0	Borussia Dortmund II	Regensburg
14:00 CET	Palionis 27'; Pusch 65'; Hofrath 90+1'	Report (in German)		Stadium: Jahnstadion; Attendance: 2,820; Referee: Bibiana Steinhaus (Hanover)

7 February 2015 24	Hansa Rostock	2–2	Jahn Regensburg	Rostock
14:00 CET	Ziemer 38'; Ruprecht 63' (pen.)	Report (in German)	Kurz 32'; Königs 45+1'	Stadium: DKB-Arena; Attendance: 8,100; Referee: Sören Storks (Velen)

14 February 2015 25	Jahn Regensburg	4–1	VfB Stuttgart II	Regensburg
14:00 CET	Aosman 14' (pen.), 78' (pen.); Lorenzi 70'; Königs 88'	Report (in German)	Ginczek 16'	Stadium: Jahnstadion; Attendance: 2,789; Referee: Alexander Sather (Grimma)

21 February 2015 26	Energie Cottbus	4–1	Jahn Regensburg	Cottbus
14:00 CET	Kleindienst 32', 58', 83'; Michel 68'	Report (in German)	Steininger 47'	Stadium: Stadion der Freundschaft; Attendance: 6,390; Referee: Daniel Schlager (Niederbühl)

28 February 2015 27	Jahn Regensburg	2–3	Dynamo Dresden	Regensburg
14:00 CET	Hesse 53'; Pusch 73'	Report (in German)	Eilers 8', 26', 30' (pen.)	Stadium: Jahnstadion; Attendance: 8,742; Referee: Arne Aarnink (Nordhorn)

7 March 2015 28	Preußen Münster	3–0	Jahn Regensburg	Münster
14:00 CET	Piossek 39'; Bischoff 62', 85' (pen.)	Report (in German)		Stadium: Preußenstadion; Attendance: 8,507; Referee: Marcel Göpferich (Bad Schönborn)

14 March 2015 29	Jahn Regensburg	1–0	Rot-Weiß Erfurt	Regensburg
14:00 CET	Aosman 90'	Report (in German)		Stadium: Jahnstadion; Attendance: 2,762; Referee: Florian Heft (Wietmarschen)

21 March 2015 30	Holstein Kiel	1–0	Jahn Regensburg	Kiel
14:00 CET	Vendelbo 9'	Report (in German)		Stadium: Holstein-Stadion; Attendance: 6,154; Referee: Tobias Welz (Wiesbaden)

4 April 2015 31	Jahn Regensburg	3–0	Wehen Wiesbaden	Regensburg
14:00 CEST	Knoll 13'; Königs 22'; Aosman 53'	Report (in German)		Stadium: Jahnstadion; Attendance: 2,827; Referee: Sven Waschitzki (Essen)

11 April 2015 32	Jahn Regensburg	1–1	VfL Osnabrück	Regensburg
14:00 CEST	Königs 55'	Report (in German)	Menga 51'	Stadium: Jahnstadion; Attendance: 4,300; Referee: Marcel Göpferich (Bad Schönborn)

18 April 2015 33	SG Sonnenhof Großaspach	2–1	Jahn Regensburg	Aspach
14:00 CEST	Gehring 26'; Rizzi 90'	Report (in German)	Königs 27'	Stadium: Mechatronik Arena; Attendance: 1,900; Referee: Lasse Koslowski (Berlin)

25 April 2015 34	Jahn Regensburg	0–0	1. FSV Mainz 05 II	Regensburg
14:00 CEST		Report (in German)		Stadium: Jahnstadion; Attendance: 3,515; Referee: Patrick Alt (Heusweiler)

2 May 2015 35	Hallescher FC	2–1	Jahn Regensburg	Halle
14:00 CEST	Osawe 5'; Gogia 29' (pen.)	Report (in German)	Lienhard 48'	Stadium: Erdgas Sportpark; Attendance: 6,054; Referee: Thorben Siewer (Drolshagen)

9 May 2015 36	Jahn Regensburg	0–1	Chemnitzer FC	Regensburg
14:00 CEST		Report (in German)	Stenzel 90+2'	Stadium: Jahnstadion; Attendance: 2,304; Referee: Tobias Reichel (Sindelfingen)

16 May 2015 37	Arminia Bielefeld	2–2	Jahn Regensburg	Bielefeld
13:30 CEST	Klos 28'; Testroet 86'	Report (in German)	Königs 77'} Güntner 80'}	Stadium: Schüco-Arena; Attendance: 25,008; Referee: Harm Osmers (Hanover)

23 May 2015 38	Jahn Regensburg	4–0	Fortuna Köln	Regensburg
13:30 CEST	Pusch 43'; Güntner 45'; Hesse 54', 56'	Report (in German)		Stadium: Jahnstadion; Attendance: 3,889; Referee: Marcel Göpferich (Bad Schönborn)

== Squad ==
=== Squad and statistics ===
==== Squad, matches played and goals scored ====
Squad Season 2014–15
No.	Player	Nat.	Birthdate	at Jahn since	previous club	League matches	League goals
Goalkeepers
1	Dominik Bergdorf	German	3 February 1993	2014	SC Freiburg	13	0
21	Alexander Heep	Germany	15 July 1992	2013	SV Heimstetten	0	0
22	Stephan Loboué	Ivory Coast	23 August 1981	2014	SV Wacker Burghausen	12	0
18	Richard Strebinger	Germany	14 February 1993	2015	SV Werder Bremen	14	0
Defenders
3	Andreas Güntner	Germany	21 July 1988	2006	Junior Team	31	4
4	Gino Windmüller	Germany	20 June 1989	2013	Bergisch Gladbach	25	1
5	Azur Velagić	Bosnia and Herzegovina	20 October 1991	2013	FC Ingolstadt	3	0
5	Adli Lachheb	Tunisia	22 July 1987	2015	KSV Hessen Kassel	5	0
14	Fabian Trettenbach	German	17 December 1991	2013	Junior Team	22	2
16	Markus Palionis	Lithuanian	12 May 1987	2014	SC Paderborn 07	22	1
19	Stanislaus Herzel	German	5 August 1990	2014	FC Augsburg	19	0
24	Matthias Dürmeyer	German	17 April 1990	2011	FC Dingolfing	15	0
28	Sebastian Nachreiner	German	29 April 1993	2010	FC Dingolfing	7	0
29	Christoph Rech	German	23 November 1988	2014	TSV 1860 Munich	5	0
32	Grégory Lorenzi	France	17 December 1983	2014	R.A.E.C. Mons	19	1
36	Lukas Sinkiewicz	German	9 October 1985	2014	VfL Bochum	9	0
Midfielders
6	Thomas Kurz	German	3 April 1988	2011	Bayern Munich	27	3
7	Patrick Lienhard	German	3 April 1988	2014	SVN Zweibrücken	23	2
8	Andreas Geipl	German	21 April 1992	2014	TSV 1860 Munich	21	0
9	Marvin Knoll	German	5 February 1990	2015	SV Sandhausen	15	1
10	Aias Aosman	German	1 January 1993	2013	1. FC Köln II	34	11
12	Jonas Erwig-Drüppel	German	21 July 1991	2014	Eintracht Braunschweig	12	0
13	Sven Kopp	German	17 February 1995	2014	SpVgg SV Weiden	4	0
17	Oliver Hein	German	20 March 1990	2007	FC Dingolfing	29	0
20	Zlatko Muhović	Bosnia and Herzegovina	8 November 1990	2014	Preußen Münster	10	0
20	Kolja Pusch	German	12 February 1993	2015	Chemnitzer FC	16	3
25	Markus Smarzoch	German	14 April 1990	2011	Freier TuS Regensburg	4	0
27	Marcel Hofrath	German	21 March 1993	2015	Chemnitzer FC	16	1
31	Uwe Hesse	German	16 December 1987	2014	SV Darmstadt 98	24	3
22	Aykut Öztürk	Turkish	7 November 1987	2015	Sivasspor	7	0
Forwards
9	Romas Dressler	German	16 October 1987	2013	Wormatia Worms	4	1
11	Benedikt Schmid	German	19 November 1990	2010	1. FC Bad Kötzting	8	1
15	Daniel Steininger	German	13 April 1995	2014	SpVgg Greuther Fürth	25	3
23	Noah Michel	German	23 May 1995	2014	Eintracht Frankfurt	2	0
23	Hannes Sigurðsson	Icelandic	10 April 1983	2015	Sandnes Ulf	3	0
30	Daniel Franziskus	German	13 August 1991	2013	Junior Team	11	1
33	Marco Königs	German	25 January 1990	2015	SV Wehen Wiesbaden	15	6
Last updated: 24 May 2015

=== Transfers ===
==== In ====
No.	Pos.	Nat.	Name	Age	EU	Moving from	Type	Transfer window	Ends	Transfer fee	Source
13	MF	(Germany)	Sven Kopp	19	EU	SpVgg Weiden (Germany)	End of contract	Summer	2016	Free	
22	GK	(Germany)	Stephan Loboué	32	EU	Wacker Burghausen (Germany)	End of contract	Summer	2016	Free	
23	FW	(Germany)	Noah Michael	19	EU	Eintracht Frankfurt (Germany)	End of contract	Summer	2016	Free	
29	DF	(Germany)	Christoph Rech	25	EU	1860 Munich (Germany)	End of contract	Summer	2016	Free	
1	GK	(Germany)	Dominik Bergdorf	21	EU	SC Freiburg (Germany)	End of contract	Summer	2016	Free	
8	MF	(Germany)	Andreas Geipl	22	EU	1860 Munich (Germany)	End of contract	Summer	2016	Free	
19	DF	(Germany)	Stanislaus Herzel	23	EU	FC Augsburg (Germany)	End of contract	Summer	2016	Free	
19	DF	(Germany)	Jonas Erwig-Drüppel	22	EU	Eintracht Braunschweig (Germany)	End of contract	Summer	2015	Free	
15	FW	(Germany)	Daniel Steininger	19	EU	SpVgg Greuther Fürth (Germany)	Loan	Summer	2015	Unknown	
16	DF	(Lithuania)	Markus Palionis	27	EU	SC Paderborn (Germany)	End of contract	Summer	2015	Free	
36	DF	(Germany)	Lukas Sinkiewicz	28	EU	VfL Bochum (Germany)	End of contract	Summer	2015	Free	
31	MF	(Germany)	Uwe Hesse	26	EU	Darmstadt 98 (Germany)	End of contract	Summer	2015	Free	
32	DF	(France)	Grégory Lorenzi	30	EU	Mons (Belgium)	End of contract	Summer	2015	Free	
33	DF	(Germany)	Marco Königs	24	EU	Wehen Wiesbaden	Transfer	Winter	2015	Unknown	
27	MF	(Germany)	Marcel Hofrath	21	EU	Chemnitzer FC	Transfer	Winter	2015	Unknown	
9	MF	(Germany)	Marvin Knoll	24	EU	SV Sandhausen	Transfer	Winter	2015	Free	
22	MF	(Turkey)	Aykut Öztürk	27	EU		Transfer	Winter	2015	Free	
18	GK	(Germany)	Richard Strebinger	21	EU	Werder Bremen	Loan	Winter	2015	Unknown	
20	MF	(Germany)	Kolja Pusch	21	EU	Chemnitzer FC	Transfer	Winter	2016	Unknown	
5	DF	(Tunisia)	Adli Lachheb	27	EU		Transfer	Winter	2015	Free	
23	FW	(Iceland)	Hannes Sigurðsson	31	EU		Transfer	Winter	2015	Free	

==== Out ====
No.	Pos.	Nat.	Name	Age	EU	Moving to	Type	Transfer window	Transfer fee	Source
8	MF	(Germany)	Jonatan Kotzke	32	EU	Wehen Wiesbaden (Germany)	End of contract	Summer	Free	
22	DF	(Germany)	Patrick Wiegers	24	EU	Dynamo Dresden (Germany)	End of contract	Summer	N/A	
22	DF	(Germany)	Mario Neunaber	24	EU	Rot-Weiss Essen (Germany)	End of contract	Summer	Free	
7	MF	(Germany)	Abdenour Amachaibou	27	EU	Preußen Münster (Germany)	End of contract	Summer	Free	
11	MF	(Germany)	Patrick Haag	24	EU	Waldhof Mannheim (Germany)	End of contract	Summer	N/A	
16	DF	(Germany)	Thorben Stadler	24	EU		End of contract	Summer	N/A	
18	MF	(Germany)	Marius Müller	23	EU	Borussia Fulda (Germany)	End of contract	Summer	N/A	
13	MF	(Germany)	Jim-Patrick Müller	24	EU	SV Sandhausen (Germany)	End of contract	Summer	Free	
23	GK	(Austria)	Bernhard Hendl	21	EU	Mainz 05 (Germany)	End of contract	Summer	Free	
27	FW	(Romania)	Ruben Popa	25	EU		End of contract	Summer	N/A	
25	MF	(Germany)	Markus Smarzoch	24	EU			Winter	N/A	
9	FW	(Germany)	Romas Dressler	27	EU	Eintracht Trier (Germany)		Winter	N/A	
22	GK	(Germany)	Stephan Loboué	33	EU		End of contract	Winter	N/A	
20	MF	(Bosnia and Herzegovina)	Zlatko Muhović	24	EU		End of contract	Winter	N/A	
19	DF	(Germany)	Jonas Erwig-Drüppel	22	EU	VfB Oldenburg (Germany)	End of contract	Winter		
23	FW	(Germany)	Noah Michel	19	EU		End of contract	Winter		
29	DF	(Germany)	Christoph Rech	25	EU	Wacker Burghausen (Germany)	Loan	Winter		
5	DF	(Bosnia and Herzegovina)	Azur Velagić	22	EU		End of contract	Winter		
