= 2013–14 SSV Jahn Regensburg season =

Jahn Regensburg
2013–14 season
- Chairman: Ulrich Weber
- Manager: Thomas Stratos
- Stadium: Jahnstadion, Regensburg, Bavaria
- 3. Liga: 11th
- DFB-Pokal: 1st Round
- Top goalscorer: League: Abdenour Amachaibou (11); All: Abdenour Amachaibou (12)
- Highest home attendance: 5,169
- Lowest home attendance: 2,528

The 2013–14 SSV Jahn Regensburg season was the 107th season in the club's football history. In 2013–14 the club played in the 3. Liga, the third tier of German football. The club was relegated from the 2. Bundesliga in this league. Regensburg finished the league in 11th place.

The club also took part in the 2013–14 edition of the DFB-Pokal, the German Cup, and lost in the first round to 2. Bundesliga team 1. FC Union Berlin.

== Review and events ==
Regensburg was relegated from the 2. Bundesliga and manager Franciszek Smuda said that he would not coach in the 3. Liga. So on 11 June 2013, it was announced that Thomas Stratos will take over the job a manager.

Jahn Regensburg took part in the 2013–14 Bavarian Cup where the two finalists qualify for the 2014–15 DFB-Pokal. Regensburg won in the first round against FC Laimerstadt with 11–0, but lost in the second round to three tier lower SV Sportfreunde Dinkelsbühl with 3–4. This means that Regensburg has to reach at least the fourth place in the league in order to qualify for the DFB-Pokal.

== Matches ==
=== Legend ===
Win Draw Loss Postponed

=== Friendly matches ===
19 June 2013	TSV 1860 München	1–3	Jahn Regensburg	Munich
16:00 CEST	Halfar 79'	Report (in German)	M. Müller 5'; Amachaibou 10', 33'	Stadium: Grünwalder Straße 114 (1er Platz)

28 June 2013	1. FC Hersbruck	1–9	Jahn Regensburg	Hersbruck
18:15 CEST	65' (pen.)	Report (in German)	Kurz 18'; Amachaibou 33', 47', 78'; Weidlich 35'; Hein 43'; Meyer 58'; Popa 71'; Aosman 83'

30 June 2013	FC Tegernheim	1–3	Jahn Regensburg	Tegernheim
14:30 CEST	Wazlawik 8'	Report (in German)	Aosman 26'; M. Müller 45'; Neunaber 50'

2 July 2013	SV Schalding-Heining	0–8	Jahn Regensburg	Zenting
18:30 CEST		Report (in German)	Anastasopoulos 13'; Dressler 16', 52'; Windmüller 21'; Amachaibou 24'; J.-P. Müller 47'; Hein 56' (pen.); Meyer 90'

5 July 2013	Jahn Regensburg	0–2	FC Augsburg	Regensburg
18:30 CEST		Report (in German)	Mölders 7'; Altıntop 38'	Stadium: Jahnstadion; Attendance: 1,400

7 July 2013	MZ-Auswahl	3–7	Jahn Regensburg	Regensburg
	Siebert 22', 49', 68'	Report (in German)	Schmid 22', 36'; Windmüller 42'; Nachreiner 45', 74'; J.-P. Müller 45'; Velagić 86'	Stadium: Stadion Schillerwiese; Attendance: 2,000

12 July 2013	SV Burgweinting	1–7	Jahn Regensburg	Burgweinting
18:00 CEST	61'	Report (in German)	Dressler 10'; Kurz 12', 15'; Güntner 45'; Weidlich 72'; Popa 78', 82'

13 July 2013	Jahn Regensburg	0–0	Dynamo Dresden	Weiden
14:00 CEST		Report (in German)		Stadium: Wasserwerk-Stadion; Attendance: 600

14 August 2013	Jahn Regensburg	4–0	Al-Wahda S.C.C.	Regensburg
18:00 CEST	Lienhard 30', 57'; M. Müller 52'; Aosman 88'	Report (in German)

15 November 2013	FC Ingolstadt	3–0	Jahn Regensburg	Ingolstadt
15:00 CET	Lappe 8'; Schäffler 33'; Eigler 51'	Report (in German)		Stadium: Tuja-Stadion

11 January 2014	SV Sandhausen	0–0	Jahn Regensburg	Sandhausen
14:00 CET		Report (in German)		Stadium: Hardtwaldstadion

14 January 2014	FC Bayern Munich II	2–2	Jahn Regensburg	Munich
14:30 CET	Schweinsteiger 62'; Weihrauch 74'	Report (in German)	Yılmaz 25', 51'

21 January 2014	TSV 1860 München II	2–2	Jahn Regensburg	Munich
14:00 CET	10'; Ott 20' (pen.)	Report (in German)	Muhović 25'; Franziskus 79'	Stadium: Grünwalder Straße

4 February 2014	Jahn Regensburg	4–2	1. FC Nürnberg II	Regensburg
15:00 CET	Čolak 34'; Klement 65'	Report (in German)	Popa 48', 90'; Amachaibou 71'; Smarzoch 75'

=== 3. Liga ===
20 July 2013 1	Jahn Regensburg	0–0	SpVgg Unterhaching	Regensburg
14:00 CEST		Report (in German)		Stadium: Jahnstadion; Attendance: 4,405; Referee: Martin Petersen (Stuttgart)

27 July 2013 2	1. FC Heidenheim	2–2	Jahn Regensburg	Heidenheim
14:00 CEST	Niederlechner 13'; Göhlert 66'	Report (in German)	Neunaber 40' (pen.); J.-P. Müller 85'	Stadium: Voith-Arena; Attendance: 7,000; Referee: Martin Thomsen (Kleve)

10 August 2013 3	MSV Duisburg	2–1	Jahn Regensburg	Duisburg
14:00 CEST	Onuegbu 38'; Tsourakis 86'	Report (in German)	Aosman 2'	Stadium: Schauinsland-Reisen-Arena; Attendance: 13,422; Referee: Arno Blos (Deizisau)

17 August 2013 4	Jahn Regensburg	3–5	Chemnitzer FC	Regensburg
14:00 CEST	Kurz 14'; Amachaibou 48', 89'	Report (in German)	Fink 24', 42'; Pusch 28', 64'; Garbuschewski 42'	Stadium: Jahnstadion; Attendance: 4,000; Referee: Robert Schröder (Hanover)

24 August 2013 5	Borussia Dortmund II	1–2	Jahn Regensburg	Dortmund
14:00 CEST	Solga 81' (pen.)	Report (in German)	Schmid 73'; J.-P. Müller 85'	Stadium: Stadion Rote Erde; Attendance: 2,258; Referee: Sven Jablonski (Bremen)

31 August 2013 6	Jahn Regensburg	2–0	SV Darmstadt 98	Regensburg
14:00 CEST	Aosman 35', 77'	Report (in German)		Stadium: Jahnstadion; Attendance: 3,250; Referee: Marcel Unger (Halle)

4 September 2013 7	Hansa Rostock	4–2	Jahn Regensburg	Rostock
19:00 CEST	Ruprecht 5'; Ioannidis 10', 13'; Starke 89'	Report (in German)	Neunaber 43'; Amachaibou 90+2'	Stadium: DKB-Arena; Attendance: 8,800; Referee: Patrick Alt (Heusweiler)

7 September 2013 8	Jahn Regensburg	2–0	1. FC Saarbrücken	Regensburg
14:00 CEST	Smarzoch 60'; Franziskus 90'	Report (in German)		Stadium: Jahnstadion; Attendance: 4,000; Referee: Robert Kempter (Sauldorf)

14 September 2013 9	Stuttgarter Kickers	3–0	Jahn Regensburg	Stuttgart
14:00 CEST	Braun 35'; Soriano 62'; Leutenecker 70'	Report (in German)		Stadium: Gazi-Stadion auf der Waldau; Attendance: 3,200; Referee: Tobias Christ (Münchweiler)

21 September 2013 10	Jahn Regensburg	2–4	Hallescher FC	Regensburg
14:00 CEST	Kotzke 4'; Amachaibou 52'	Report (in German)	Bertram 14'; Furuholm 40'; Lindenhahn 85'; Baude 89'	Stadium: Jahnstadion; Attendance: 3,045; Referee: Marcel Göpferich (Bad Schönborn)

28 September 2013 11	Preußen Münster	0–0	Jahn Regensburg	Münster
14:00 CEST		Report (in German)		Stadium: Preußenstadion; Attendance: 6,351; Referee: Florian Steinberg (Korntal)

5 October 2013 12	Jahn Regensburg	1–1	Wacker Burghausen	Regensburg
14:00 CEST	Amachaibou 74'	Report (in German)	Benčík 69'	Stadium: Jahnstadion; Attendance: 4,100; Referee: Arno Blos (Deizisau)

19 October 2013 13	RB Leipzig	2–0	Jahn Regensburg	Leipzig
14:00 CEST	Heidinger 44'; Frahn 83'	Report (in German)		Stadium: Red Bull Arena; Attendance: 8,742; Referee: Sven Jablonski (Bremen)

26 October 2013 14	Jahn Regensburg	3–1	Rot-Weiß Erfurt	Regensburg
14:00 CEST	Smarzoch 48'; Hein 88' (pen.); Schmid 90+4'	Report (in German)	Nietfeld 77'	Stadium: Jahnstadion; Attendance: 3,152; Referee: Robert Schröder (Hanover)

2 November 2013 15	Wehen Wiesbaden	1–1	Jahn Regensburg	Wiesbaden
14:00 CET	Jänicke 35'	Report (in German)	Kotzke 14'	Stadium: BRITA-Arena; Attendance: 2,613; Referee: Tobias Reichel (Sindelfingen)

9 November 2013 16	Jahn Regensburg	1–0	Holstein Kiel	Regensburg
14:00 CET	Dressler 86'	Report (in German)		Stadium: Jahnstadion; Attendance: 3,315; Referee: Malte Dittrich (Bremen)

23 November 2013 17	SV Elversberg	3–1	Jahn Regensburg	Spiesen-Elversberg
14:00 CET	Vaccaro 41', 71', 90+1'	Report (in German)	J.-P. Müller	Stadium: Waldstadion an der Kaiserlinde; Attendance: 680; Referee: Alexander Sather (Grimma)

30 November 2013 18	Jahn Regensburg	2–0	VfB Stuttgart II	Regensburg
14:00 CET	Aosman 10'; Hein 57'	Report (in German)		Stadium: Jahnstadion; Attendance: 2,528; Referee: Stefan Glasmacher (Alsdorf)

7 December 2013 19	VfL Osnabrück	1–0	Jahn Regensburg	Osnabrück
14:00 CET	Testroet 27'	Report (in German)		Stadium: Osnatel-Arena; Attendance: 5,534; Referee: Jonas Weickenmeier (Frankfurt)

14 December 2013 20	Jahn Regensburg	0–0	1. FC Heidenheim	Regensburg
14:00 CET		Report (in German)		Stadium: Jahnstadion; Attendance: 3,100; Referee: Florian Heft (Wietmarschen)

21 December 2013 21	SpVgg Unterhaching	0–4	Jahn Regensburg	Unterhaching
14:00 CET		Report (in German)	Neunaber 18'; Dressler 28'; Amachaibou 55'; Fabian Trettenbach 90'	Stadium: Stadion am Sportpark; Attendance: 2,000; Referee: Arno Blos (Deizisau)

25 January 2014 22	Jahn Regensburg	1–1	MSV Duisburg	Regensburg
14:00 CET	Dressler 54'	Report (in German)	Zoundi 45+2'	Stadium: Jahnstadion; Attendance: 3,069; Referee: Christian Dingert (Lebecksmühle)

1 February 2014 23	Chemnitzer FC	0–3	Jahn Regensburg	Chemnitz
14:00 CET		Report (in German)	J.-P. Müller 43', 53'; Amachaibou 48'	Stadium: Stadion an der Gellertstraße; Attendance: 5,000; Referee: Florian Steinberg (Korntal)

8 February 2014 24	Jahn Regensburg	2–1	Borussia Dortmund II	Regensburg
14:00 CET	Nyarko 35'	Report (in German)	Windmüller 61'; Dressler 73'	Stadium: Jahnstadion; Attendance: 3,661; Referee: Norbert Giese (Großräschen)

15 February 2014 25	SV Darmstadt 98	2–1	Jahn Regensburg	Darmstadt
14:00 CET	Sailer 17'; Stroh-Engel 61'	Report (in German)	Dressler 90'	Stadium: Stadion am Böllenfalltor; Attendance: 5,600; Referee: Alexander Sather (Grimma)

23 February 2014 26	Jahn Regensburg	1–1	Hansa Rostock	Regensburg
14:00 CET	Savran 24' (pen.)	Report (in German)	Neunaber 82' (pen.)	Stadium: Jahnstadion; Attendance: 5,169; Referee: Sören Storks (Velen)

1 March 2014 27	1. FC Saarbrücken	3–2	Jahn Regensburg	Saarbrücken
14:00 CET	Ziemer 10' (pen.); Mandt 53'; Ishihara 70'	Report (in German)	Amachaibou 25', 90+2'	Stadium: Ludwigsparkstadion; Attendance: 4,273; Referee: René Rohde (Rostock)

8 March 2014 28	Jahn Regensburg	0–1	Stuttgarter Kickers	Regensburg
14:00 CET		Report (in German)	Edwini-Bonsu 90'	Stadium: Jahnstadion; Attendance: 3,520; Referee: Jonas Weickenmeier (Frankfurt)

15 March 2014 29	Hallescher FC	4–1	Jahn Regensburg	Halle
14:00 CET	Gogia 21', 70'; Furuholm 38', 65'	Report (in German)	Franziskus 74'	Stadium: Erdgas Sportpark; Attendance: 6,311; Referee: Arno Blos (Deizisau)

22 March 2014 30	Jahn Regensburg	2–0	Preußen Münster	Regensburg
14:00 CET	J.-P. Müller 7'; Franziskus 81'	Report (in German)		Stadium: Jahnstadion; Attendance: 3,045; Referee: Tobias Reichel (Sindelfingen)

25 March 2014 31	Wacker Burghausen	2–2	Jahn Regensburg	Burghausen
19:00 CET	Burkhardt 4'; Schröck 70'	Report (in German)	Amachaibou 83'; Aosman 90' (pen.)	Stadium: Wacker-Arena; Attendance: 2,600; Referee: Sven Jablonski (Bremen)

29 March 2014 32	Jahn Regensburg	0–3	RB Leipzig	Regensburg
14:00 CET		Report (in German)	Frahn 1'; Jung 20'; Hoheneder 86'	Stadium: Jahnstadion; Attendance: 4,022; Referee: Stefan Glasmacher (Alsdorf)

5 April 2014 33	Rot-Weiß Erfurt	2–3	Jahn Regensburg	Erfurt
14:00 CEST	Pfingsten-Reddig 9' (pen.); Kammlott 67'	Report (in German)	Neunaber 30' (pen.); Muhović 59'; Windmüller 75'	Stadium: Steigerwaldstadion; Attendance: 4,980; Referee: Frank Willenborg (Osnabrück)

12 April 2014 34	Jahn Regensburg	3–0	Wehen Wiesbaden	Regensburg
14:00 CEST	Muhović 21'; Neunaber 73' (pen.); Amachaibou 81'	Report (in German)		Stadium: Jahnstadion; Attendance: 2,868; Referee: Markus Wingenbach (Mainz)

19 April 2014 35	Holstein Kiel	0–0	Jahn Regensburg	Kiel
14:00 CEST		Report (in German)		Stadium: Holstein-Stadion; Attendance: 5,339; Referee: Norbert Grudzinski (Hamburg)

26 April 2014 36	Jahn Regensburg	0–0	SV Elversberg	Regensburg
14:00 CEST		Report (in German)		Stadium: Jahnstadion; Attendance: 2,859; Referee: Thorben Siewer (Drolshagen)

3 May 2014 37	VfB Stuttgart II	1–1	Jahn Regensburg	Stuttgart
13:30 CEST	Geyer 24' (pen.)	Report (in German)	J.-P. Müller 66'	Stadium: Gazi-Stadion auf der Waldau; Attendance: 430; Referee: Stefan Glasmacher (Alsdorf)

10 May 2014 38	Jahn Regensburg	0–0	VfL Osnabrück	Regensburg
13:30 CEST		Report (in German)		Stadium: Jahnstadion; Attendance: 3,156; Referee: Timo Gerach (Landau)

=== DFB-Pokal ===
5 August 2013 1st Round	Jahn Regensburg	1–2	1. FC Union Berlin	Regensburg
18:30 CEST	Abdenour Amachaibou 19'	Report	Brandy 21'; Köhler 42'	Stadium: Jahnstadion; Attendance: 6,249; Referee: Tobias Welz (Wiesbaden)

== Squad ==
=== Squad and statistics ===
==== Squad, matches played and goals scored ====
Squad Season 2013–14
No.	Player	Nat.	Birthdate	at Jahn since	previous club	League matches	League goals	Cup matches	Cup goals
Goalkeepers
1	Patrick Wiegers	German	19 April 1990	2010	SpVgg Grün-Weiss Deggendorf	13	0	0	0
23	Bernhard Hendl	Austria	9 August 1992	2013	VfB Stuttgart II	25	0	1	0
Defenders
3	Andreas Güntner	Germany	21 July 1988	2006	Junior Team	27	0	0	0
4	Gino Windmüller	Germany	20 June 1989	2013	Bergisch Gladbach	34	2	0	0
5	Azur Velagić	Bosnia and Herzegovina	20 October 1991	2013	FC Ingolstadt	25	0	0	0
8	Jonatan Kotzke	German	8 July 1986	2012	1860 München	26	2	0	0
16	Thorben Stadler	German	8 February 1990	2013	Stuttgarter Kickers	6	0	0	0
22	Mario Neunaber	German	17 March 1982	2011	Hessen Kassel	32	5	1	0
28	Sebastian Nachreiner	German	23 November 1988	2010	FC Dingolfing	38	0	1	0
33	Nicolas DeProspero	German	19 May 1990	2013	Hampson-Sydney College	3	0	1	0
Midfielders
7	Abdenour Amachaibou	German	2 January 1987	2012	SpVgg Unterhaching	35	11	1	1
10	Aias Aosman	Syrian	1 January 1993	2013	1. FC Köln II	33	5	1	0
11	Patrick Haag	German	9 March 1990	2012	Karlsruher SC	21	0	1	0
13	Jim-Patrick Müller	German	4 August 1989	2011	Greuther Fürth	35	7	1	0
14	Fabian Trettenbach	German	17 December 1991	2013	Junior Team	16	1	1	0
17	Oliver Hein	German	20 March 1990	2007	FC Dingolfing	33	2	1	0
18	Marius Müller	German	5 October 1990	2012	FSV Frankfurt	10	0	1	0
20	Zlatko Muhović	Bosnia and Herzegovina	8 November 1990	2014	Preußen Münster	16	2	0	0
21	Dimitrios Anastasopoulos	Greece	11 April 1990	2013	AEK Athens	4	0	1	0
Forwards
6	Thomas Kurz	German	3 April 1988	2011	Bayern Munich	6	1	1	0
9	Romas Dressler	German	16 October 1987	2013	Wormatia Worms	19	5	1	0
19	Benedikt Schmid	German	19 November 1990	2010	1. FC Bad Kötzting	21	2	1	0
25	Markus Smarzoch	German	14 April 1990	2011	Freier TuS Regensburg	23	2	0	0
27	Ruben Popa	Romania	22 March 1989	2009	Junior Team	13	0	0	0
30	Daniel Franziskus	German	13 August 1991	2013	Junior Team	17	3	0	0
Last updated: 10 May 2014

=== Transfers ===
==== In ====
No.	Pos.	Nat.	Name	Age	EU	Moving from	Type	Transfer window	Ends	Transfer fee	Source
4	DF	(Germany)	Gino Windmüller	24	EU	Bergisch Gladbach	End of contract	Summer	2015	Free	
5	DF	(Bosnia and Herzegovina)	Azur Velagić	21	EU	FC Ingolstadt	End of contract	Summer	2015	Free	
14	MF	(Germany)	Fabian Trettenbach	21	EU	Jahn Regensburg	Junior team	Summer	2014	N/A	
27	FW	(Romania)	Ruben Popa	24	EU	Jahn Regensburg	Junior team	Summer	2014	N/A	
21	MF	(Greece)	Dimitrios Anastasopoulos	23	EU	AEK Athens (Greece)	End of contract	Summer	2014	Free	
9	FW	(Germany)	Romas Dressler	25	EU	Wormatia Worms	End of contract	Summer	2015	Free	
3	DF	(Germany)	Andreas Güntner	24	EU	Jahn Regensburg	Junior team	Summer	2014	N/A	
10	MF	(Germany)	Aias Aosman	20	EU	1. FC Köln	End of contract	Summer	2015	Free	
16	DF	(Germany)	Thorben Stadler	23	EU	Stuttgarter Kickers	End of contract	Summer	2014	Free	
30	FW	(Germany)	Daniel Franziskus	21	EU	Jahn Regensburg	Junior team	Summer	2014	N/A	
20	MF	(Bosnia and Herzegovina)	Zlatko Muhović	22	EU	Preußen Münster	End of contract	Winter	2015	Free	

==== Out ====
No.	Pos.	Nat.	Name	Age	EU	Moving to	Type	Transfer window	Transfer fee	Source
1	GK	(Germany)	Michael Hofmann	40	EU	Retired	End of contract	Summer	Free	
30	MF	(Canada)	Julian de Guzman	32		Skoda Xanthi (Greece)	End of contract	Summer	Free	
34	MF	(Republic of the Congo)	Wilson Kamavuaka	23		Mechelen (Belgium)	End of contract	Summer	Free	
30	MF	(Spain)	Koke	30			End of contract	Summer	Free	
38	DF	(Germany)	Philipp Ziereis	20	EU	FC St. Pauli	End of contract	Summer	Unknown	
26	GK	(Germany)	Timo Ochs	31	EU	1. FC Saarbrücken	End of contract	Summer	Free	
27	FW	(Germany)	Julian Wießmeier	20	EU	1. FC Nürnberg	End of loan	Summer	N/A	
39	FW	(Germany)	Marco Djuricin	20	EU	Hertha BSC	End of loan	Summer	N/A	
4	FW	(Brazil)	Ramon	22	EU		End of contract	Summer	Free	
6	DF	(Germany)	André Laurito	19	EU	Rot-Weiß Erfurt	Transfer	Summer	Unknown	
19	FW	(Germany)	Koray Altinay	21	EU	Çaykur Rizespor (Turkey)	Transfer	Summer	Unknown	
24	DF	(Germany)	Tim Erfen	30	EU		End of contract	Summer	Free	
3	DF	(Germany)	Christian Rahn	34	EU	FC St. Pauli	End of contract	Summer	Free	
12	FW	(Republic of the Congo)	Francky Sembolo	27	EU	Arminia Bielefeld	Transfer	Summer	Unknown	
32	FW	(Brazil)	Carlinhos	19		Bayer Leverkusen (Germany)	End of Loan	Summer	N/A	
9	FW	(Germany)	Sebastian Hofmann	29	EU	FC Nöttingen (Germany)	End of contract	Summer	Free	
20	MF	(Germany)	Denis-Danso Weidlich	26	EU	Hansa Rostock	Transfer	Summer	Unknown	
20	MF	(Greece)	Dimitrios Anastasopoulos	23	EU		End of contract	Winter	Unknown	
