= Baude =

Baude is a surname. Notable people with the surname include:

- Anna-Lisa Baude (1897–1968), Swedish film actress
- Christian Baude (born 1982), German luger
- Dawn-Michelle Baude (born 1959), American poet, journalist and educator
- Frank Baude (1936–2021), Swedish politician and bricklayer
- Marcel Baude (born 1989), German footballer
- William Baude, American legal scholar
