= Nina Brüggemann =

German footballer (born 1993)

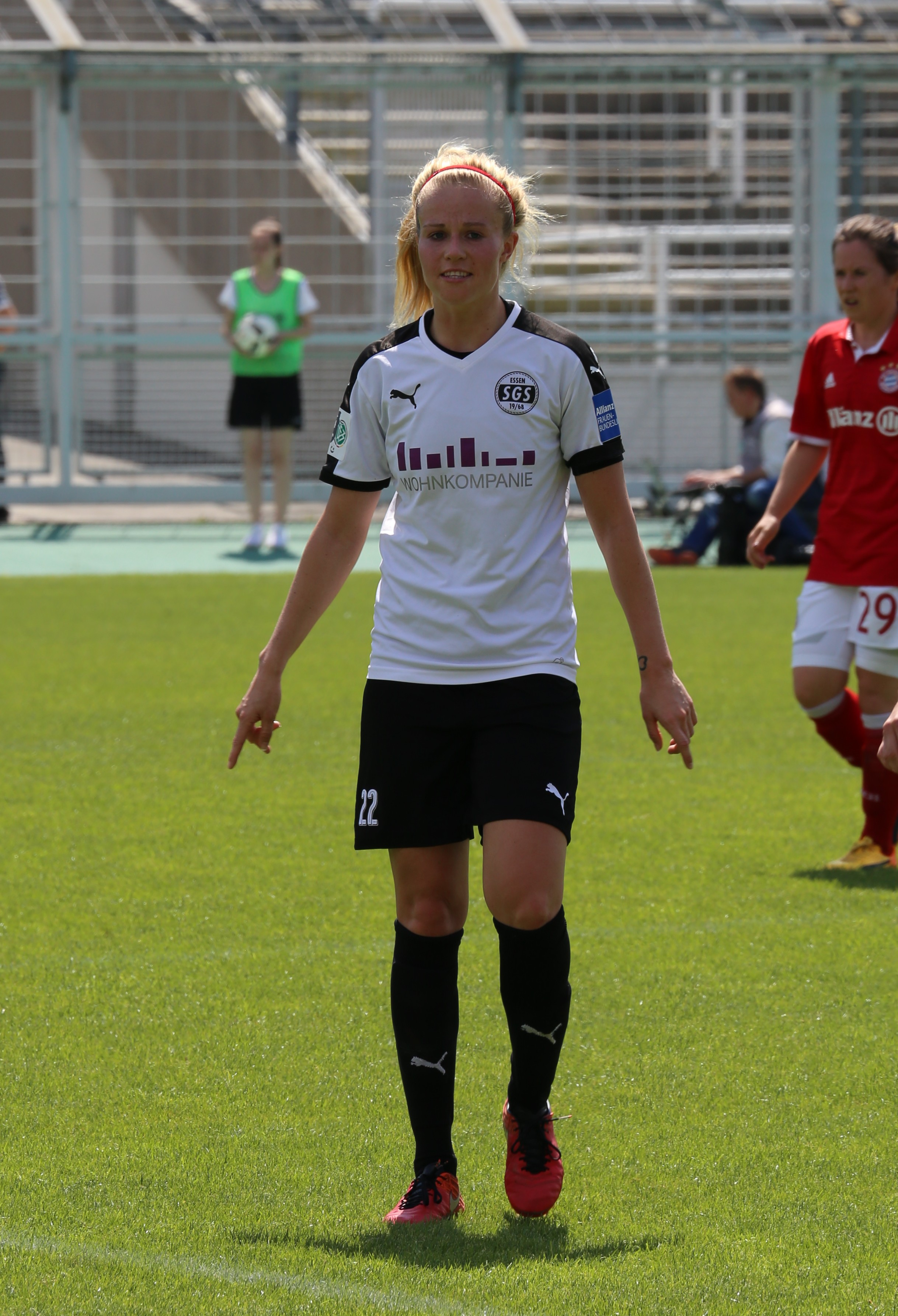
- Brüggemann with Essen in 2017

Personal information
- Date of birth: 11 February 1993 (age 33)
- Place of birth: Pinneberg, Germany
- Height: 1.75 m (5 ft 9 in)
- Position: Defender

Youth career
- FC Union Tornesch
- –2009: TSV Uetersen
- 2009: Hamburger SV

College career
Years	Team	Apps	(Gls)
2012	Arizona State Sun Devils	17	(0)

Senior career*
Years	Team	Apps	(Gls)
2009–2012	Hamburger SV	37	(2)
2010–2011	Hamburger SV II	16	(2)
2013–2015	BV Cloppenburg	30	(2)
2015–2020	SGS Essen	78	(7)
2020–2022	Bayer 04 Leverkusen	16	(1)
2022–2025	Hamburger SV	19	(1)

International career
2008	Germany U15	4	(0)
2009	Germany U16	1	(0)
2010	Germany U19	1	(0)
- * Club domestic league appearances and goals as of 22 February 2026

Nina Brüggemann (born 11 February 1993) is a German former footballer who plays as a defender.

== Early life ==
Born in Pinneberg, Germany, Brüggemann began playing football at the age of six. Her father, Detlev, worked as the senior administrative officer of the amt of Pinnau and as the deputy chairman of the district sports association. As a child, she competed in multiple sports: Brüggemann was the only girl on her junior football teams, won the North German championship in table tennis, and competed at the North German championships in athletics. When she was 15 years old, Brüggemann committed herself to football, saying that it "has always been my greatest passion - it's simply more fun to compete in a team."

Brüggemann attended the Johannes-Brahms-Schule until 2012. She attended Arizona State University for one year, and upon her return to Germany, Brüggemann studied sports and biology at the University of Duisburg-Essen.

== Club career ==
After playing in the youth ranks for FC Union Tornesch and TSV Uetersen, Brüggemann joined the juniors at Hamburger SV in the summer of 2009. She made her Frauen-Bundesliga debut on 27 September 2009 against SGS Essen, entering as a substitute in the 29th minute, and scored the game-winning goal in the 84th minute to hand Hamburg a 3–2 victory. Over three seasons, Brüggemann scored two goals in 37 Bundesliga appearances, before Hamburg withdrew from the league following the 2011–12 season. Brüggemann moved to the United States and spent one year playing college soccer for the Arizona State Sun Devils. She then returned to Germany and, ahead of the 2013–14 season, signed a two-year contract with newly promoted BV Cloppenburg. After scoring two goals in 30 Bundesliga appearances, Brüggemann moved to SGS Essen in the summer of 2015. After five seasons, she joined Bayer 04 Leverkusen in 2020, then returned to Hamburger SV in 2022, now in the Frauen-Regionalliga.

== International career ==
Between 2008 and 2010, Brüggemann played a total of six games for the Germany women's national youth football teams.

== Career statistics ==
As of 30 September 2023

Appearances and goals by club, season and competition
Club	Season	League			Cup (Note: All appearances in the DFB-Pokal Frauen)		Other		Total	
Club	Season	Division	Apps	Goals	Apps	Goals	Apps	Goals	Apps	Goals
Hamburger SV	2009–10	Frauen-Bundesliga	18	1	1	0	—		19	1
Hamburger SV	2010–11	Frauen-Bundesliga	3	0	0	0	4 (Note: Appearances in the Bundesliga Cup)	2	7	2
Hamburger SV	2011–12	Frauen-Bundesliga	16	1	2	0	—		18	1
Hamburger SV	Total		37	2	3	0	4	2	44	4
Hamburger SV II	2010–11	2. Frauen-Bundesliga	16	2	—		—		16	2
BV Cloppenburg	2013–14	Frauen-Bundesliga	13	1	1	0	—		14	1
BV Cloppenburg	2014–15	2. Frauen-Bundesliga	17	1	3	1	—		20	2
BV Cloppenburg	Total		30	2	4	1	0	0	34	3
SGS Essen	2015–16	Frauen-Bundesliga	21	3	2	1	—		23	4
SGS Essen	2016–17	Frauen-Bundesliga	19	2	1	0	—		20	2
SGS Essen	2017–18	Frauen-Bundesliga	6	0	0	0	—		6	0
SGS Essen	2018–19	Frauen-Bundesliga	17	0	2	1	—		19	1
SGS Essen	2019–20	Frauen-Bundesliga	15	2	5	0	—		20	2
SGS Essen	Total		78	7	10	2	0	0	88	9
Bayer 04 Leverkusen	2020–21	Frauen-Bundesliga	14	1	1	0	—		15	1
Bayer 04 Leverkusen	2021–22	Frauen-Bundesliga	2	0	1	0	—		3	0
Bayer 04 Leverkusen	Total		16	1	2	0	0	0	18	1
Hamburger SV	2022–23	Frauen-Regionalliga	18	1	0	0	1 (Note: Appearance in the Frauen-Regionalliga promotion play-offs)	0	19	1
Hamburger SV	2023–24	2. Frauen-Bundesliga	1	0	0	0	—		1	0
Hamburger SV	Total		19	1	0	0	1	0	20	1
Career total			196	15	19	3	5	2	220	20
