= Velagić =

Velagić is a Bosnian surname. Notable people with the surname include:

- Admir Velagić (born 1975), Bosnian footballer
- Almir Velagić (born 1981), Bosnian-German weightlifter
- Azur Velagić (born 1991), Bosnian footballer

== See also ==
- Velagićevina, a historical site of the Velagić family near Blagaj, Bosnia and Herzegovina
