= Evans Nyarko =

Ghanaian-born German footballer

Personal information
- Full name: Evans Owusu Nyarko
- Date of birth: 6 July 1992 (age 34)
- Place of birth: Ghana
- Height: 1.82 m (6 ft 0 in)
- Position: Defensive midfielder

Youth career
- –2005: TSV Uetersen
- 2005–2010: Hamburger SV

Senior career*
Years	Team	Apps	(Gls)
2010–2012	Hamburger SV II	23	(0)
2012–2013	Fortuna Düsseldorf II	33	(0)
2012–2013	Fortuna Düsseldorf	0	(0)
2013–2015	Borussia Dortmund II	64	(2)
2015	Holstein Kiel II	3	(1)
2015–2017	Holstein Kiel	22	(1)
2017–2018	SV Wehen Wiesbaden	1	(0)
2019–2022	Eintracht Norderstedt	53	(11)
- * Club domestic league appearances and goals as of 24 March 2019

Evans Owusu Nyarko (born July 6, 1992) is a Ghanaian-born German football midfielder.

In 2013, he joined Borussia Dortmund II.
