= Heini Müller (footballer, born 1934) =

German footballer

Personal information
- Full name: Heinrich Müller
- Date of birth: 18 February 1934 (age 92)
- Place of birth: Roth, Bavaria, Germany
- Position: Midfielder

Senior career*
Years	Team	Apps	(Gls)
1956–1967	1. FC Nürnberg	313	(46)
Total		313	(46)

Managerial career
- 1. FC Nuremberg (Amateure)
- * Club domestic league appearances and goals

Heini Müller (born 18 February 1934 in Roth, Bavaria) is a former German footballer.

Müller made 43 appearances for 1. FC Nürnberg in the Bundesliga during his playing career.

Müller's son, Bernd Müller (born 1963), was also a footballer, while his grandson, Jim-Patrick (born 1989), plays for SpVgg Unterhaching.
