= Bernd Müller (footballer, born 1963) =

German footballer and manager

Personal information
- Full name: Bernd Müller
- Date of birth: 25 April 1963 (age 63)
- Place of birth: West Germany
- Height: 1.84 m (6 ft 0 in)
- Position: Striker

Senior career*
Years	Team	Apps	(Gls)
–1984	TSV Roth		
1984–1986	TSV 04 Schwabach		
1986–1987	1. FC Nürnberg (A)	30	(15)
1987–1989	Bayern Munich (A)	31	(20)
1989–1991	SpVgg Unterhaching	59	(20)
1991–1997	SpVgg Fürth	179	(63)
1997–1999	SC 04 Schwabach	28	(11)
1999–2000	1. FC Nürnberg (A)	33	(12)
2000–2003	TSV Roth		
2003–2007	ESV Ansbach-Eyb		

Managerial career
- 2000–2003: TSV Roth (player-manager)
- 2003–2007: ESV Ansbach-Eyb (player-manager)
- 2007–2008: TV 21 Büchenbach
- 2009–2011: SV Rednitzhembach
- * Club domestic league appearances and goals

Bernd Müller (born 25 April 1963) is a German football manager and former player.

Müller comes from a footballing family, his father Heini played in the Bundesliga for 1. FC Nürnberg and his son, Jim-Patrick (born 1989), plays for SpVgg Unterhaching.
