= Noah Michel =

German footballer

Personal information
- Date of birth: 23 May 1995 (age 31)
- Place of birth: Lich, Hesse, Germany
- Height: 1.82 m (6 ft 0 in)
- Position: Forward

Team information
- Current team: Türk Gücü Friedberg
- Number: 33

Youth career
- Sportfreunde Oberau
- –2010: Eintracht Frankfurt
- 2010–2011: Rot-Weiß Erfurt
- 2011–2014: Eintracht Frankfurt

Senior career*
Years	Team	Apps	(Gls)
2014–2015	Jahn Regensburg	2	(0)
2014–2015	Jahn Regensburg II	3	(1)
2015	Bayern Alzenau	15	(2)
2015–2018	Viktoria Nidda	66	(60)
2018–2020	FC Gießen	33	(13)
2020–	Türk Gücü Friedberg	10	(15)
- * Club domestic league appearances and goals as of 17:40, 11 February 2021 (UTC)

Noah Michel (born 23 May 1995) is a German footballer who plays as a forward for Türk Gücü Friedberg.

== Career ==
Michel made his professional debut for Jahn Regensburg in the 3. Liga on 24 September 2014, coming on as a substitute in the 81st minute for Benedikt Schmid in the 0–2 home loss against Holstein Kiel.
