= FC Union Tornesch =

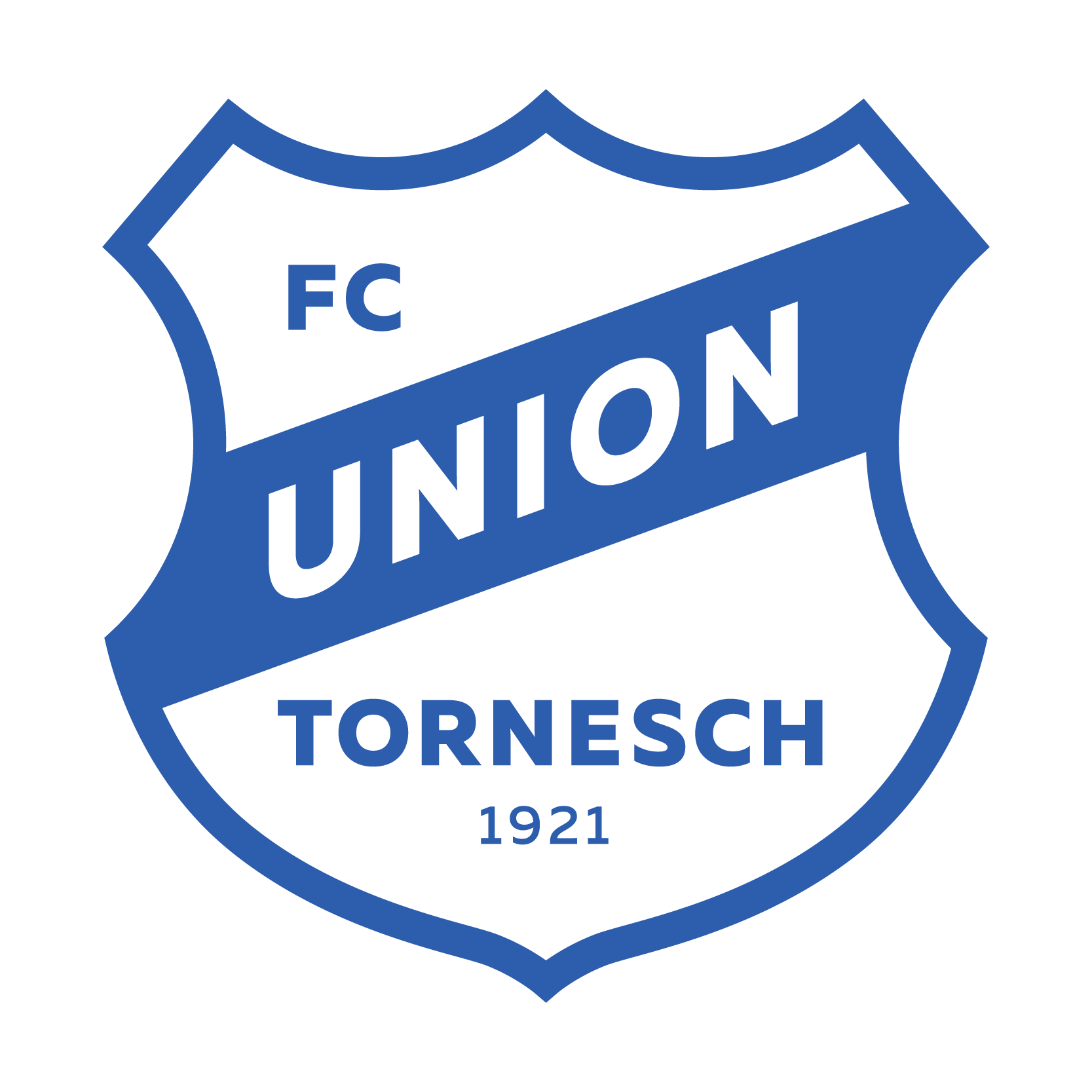
- Full name: Fußballclub "Union" Tornesch von 1921 e.V.
- Short name: FC Union Tornesch
- Founded: 1921
- Ground: Torneum Football Park
- Capacity: 1500
- Chairman: Detlef Arndt
- League: Landesliga Hamburg
- 2023/24: 17th (relegated)
- Website: https://www.union-tornesch.de/
Home colours

FC Union Tornesch (officially: Fußballclub "Union" Tornesch von 1921 e.V.) is a football club from Tornesch in the district of Pinneberg, Schleswig-Holstein, Germany. The men's first team gained promotion to the Oberliga Hamburg in 2019.

== History ==
The club was founded in the summer of 1921 as FC Union Esingen. After the end of World War II, the club was not allowed to continue using its name. Therefore, in 1946, SV Blau-Weiß Tornesch was founded as the successor club. Three years later, the club took on its current name. At the same time, all other sports were discontinued except football. Although the club is based in Schleswig-Holstein, the teams of Union participate in the league system of the Hamburg Football Association.

=== Men ===
The men's team played in the second-highest Hamburg amateur league from 1948 to 1952, from 1953 to 1955, and from 1964 to 1969, mostly oscillating between the Bezirksliga and Kreisliga. In the mid-2010s, the club experienced a sporting upswing, with renewed promotion to the Bezirksliga in 2014 and to the Landesliga two years later. In 2019, Tornesch finished third in the Landesliga. As Oberliga champion Altona 93 gained promotion to the Regionalliga Nord and Wedeler TSV withdrew their team from the Oberliga, a decisive match was played between the third-placed teams from the two Landesliga divisions. Union won the match against VfL Lohbrügge 2-1 and earned promotion.

=== Women ===
The club founded a women's team in 1970. Only in the early 1990s was the club unable to field a team. Since 2008, Union's women's team has been playing in the highest Hamburg league. The greatest successes were the runner-up finishes in 2016 and 2017 behind FC St. Pauli and Walddörfer SV, respectively. In 2019, the Tornesch women reached the final of the Hamburg Cup, but lost 2–4 against Hamburger SV. In the 2022/23 season, they reached the cup final again, but were defeated 1–6 by FC St. Pauli.

== Personalities ==
- Oliver Bock
- Nina Brüggemann
- Janina Haye
- Marco Kostmann
- Saskia Schippmann
