= Dominik Bergdorf =

German footballer

Personal information
- Date of birth: 3 February 1993 (age 33)
- Place of birth: Lauchringen, Germany
- Height: 1.85 m (6 ft 1 in)
- Position: Goalkeeper

Youth career
- SC Lauchringen
- –2009: Grasshopper Club Zürich
- 2009–2012: SC Freiburg

Senior career*
Years	Team	Apps	(Gls)
2012–2014	SC Freiburg II	24	(0)
2014–2015	Jahn Regensburg	13	(0)
2015–2016	Sportfreunde Lotte	1	(0)
2016–2017	Offenburger FV	28	(0)
2017–2022	FC Denzlingen	66	(0)
- * Club domestic league appearances and goals as of 1 July 2022 (UTC)

Dominik Bergdorf (born 3 February 1993) is a former German footballer. He played for the youth teams of SC Lauchringen, Grasshopper Club Zürich, and SC Freiburg and 2011 and 2012, he won the DFB Youth Cup with the Freiburg's U19.

Since summer 2022, Bergdorf has been the goalkeeping coach of SC Freiburg's women's team.

== Career ==
Bergdorf made his professional debut for Regensburg on 9 August 2014 in a 3. Liga match against Borussia Dortmund II. Regensburg lost the match 5–1.
