= Marcel Hofrath =

German footballer

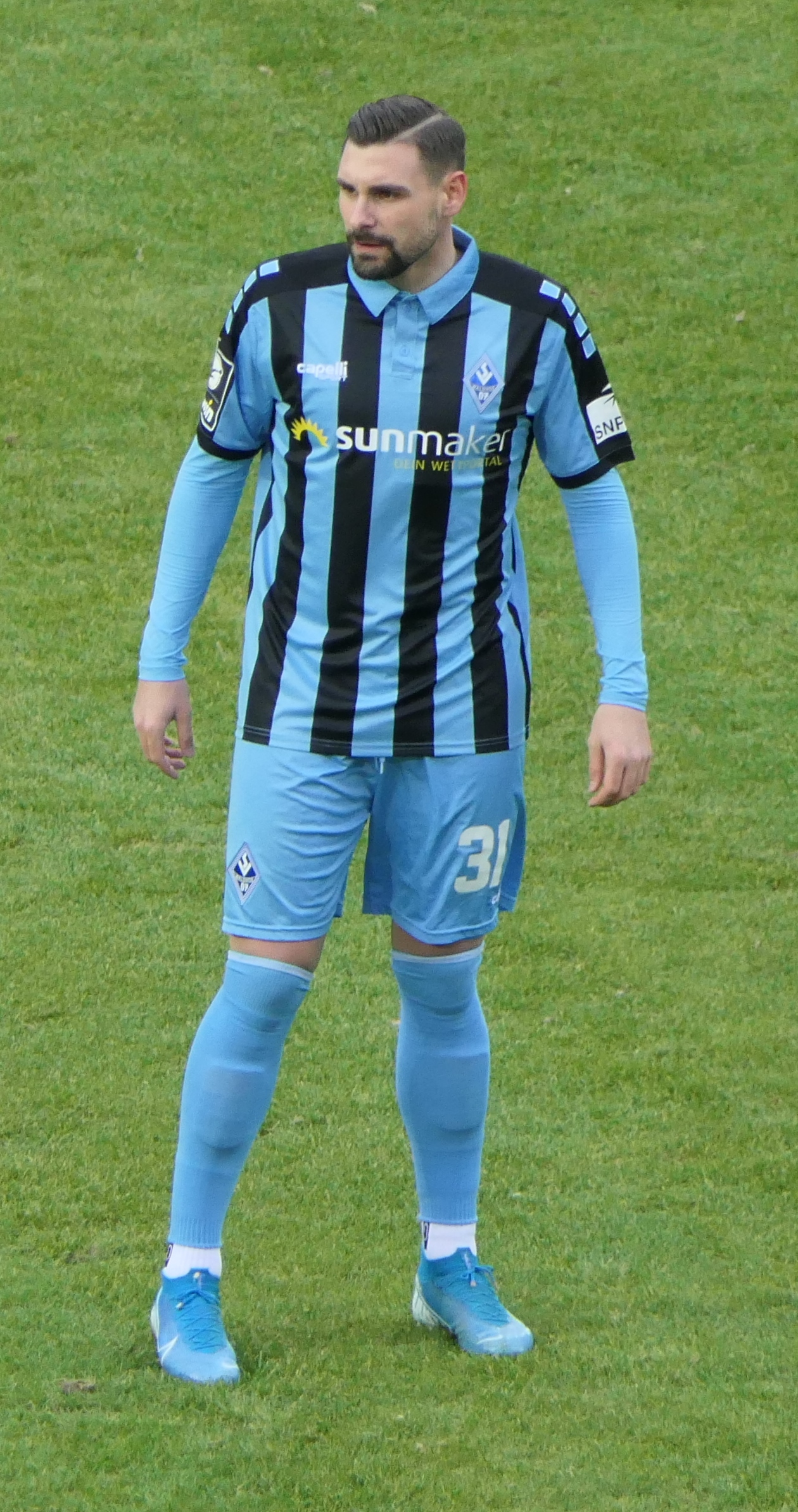
- Hofrath with Waldhof Mannheim in 2019

Personal information
- Date of birth: 21 March 1993 (age 33)
- Place of birth: Düsseldorf, Germany
- Height: 1.78 m (5 ft 10 in)
- Positions: Left-back; left midfielder

Team information
- Current team: SGV Freiberg
- Number: 31

Youth career
- –2002: TV Grafenberg
- 2002–2012: Fortuna Düsseldorf

Senior career*
Years	Team	Apps	(Gls)
2012–2014	Fortuna Düsseldorf	25	(5)
2014–2015	Chemnitzer FC	21	(4)
2015–2018	Jahn Regensburg	71	(4)
2018–2021	Waldhof Mannheim	67	(3)
2021–	SGV Freiberg	27	(0)
- * Club domestic league appearances and goals as of 12 November 2022

Marcel Hofrath (born 21 March 1993) is a German professional footballer who plays as a left-back or left midfielder for SGV Freiberg.

== Club career ==
As a youth, he played for TV Grafenberg and Fortuna Düsseldorf.

On 31 January 2014, he moved from Fortuna Düsseldorf to Chemnitzer FC on a free transfer. In the 2015 winter transfer window, he joined SSV Jahn Regensburg. After being released from Regensburg, he joined SV Waldhof Mannheim.
