= Daniel Steininger =

German footballer (born 1995)

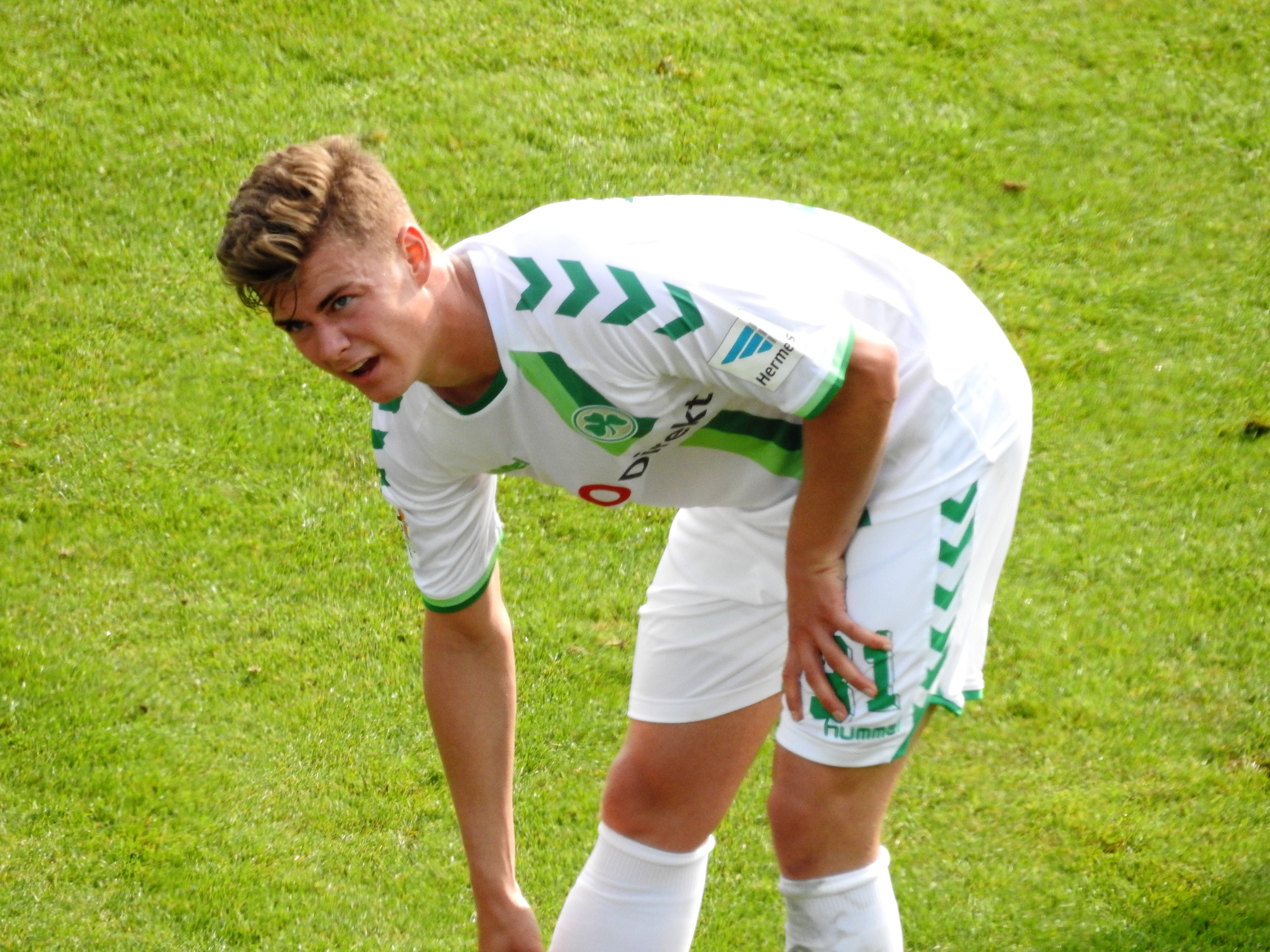
- Steininger with Greuther Fürth in 2017

Personal information
- Date of birth: 13 April 1995 (age 31)
- Place of birth: Passau, Germany
- Height: 1.87 m (6 ft 2 in)
- Position: Forward

Team information
- Current team: DJK Vilzing
- Number: 27

Youth career
- 2000–2003: DJK Sonnen
- 2003–2008: FC Sturm Hauzenberg
- 2008–2009: 1. FC Passau
- 2009–2010: SpVgg Grün-Weiß Deggendorf
- 2000–2013: Greuther Fürth

Senior career*
Years	Team	Apps	(Gls)
2013–2020	Greuther Fürth II	86	(24)
2014–2015	→ Jahn Regensburg (loan)	25	(3)
2016–2020	Greuther Fürth	49	(5)
2020–2021	1. FC Magdeburg	28	(1)
2021–2023	SpVgg Bayreuth	55	(10)
2023–2025	TSV Steinbach Haiger	31	(1)
2024	TSV Steinbach II	4	(4)
2025–	DJK Vilzing	13	(2)

International career^{‡}
2014	Germany U19	1	(0)
- * Club domestic league appearances and goals as of 9 March 2026 ‡ National team caps and goals as of 13:31, 15 March 2015 (UTC)

Daniel Steininger (born 13 April 1995) is a German professional footballer who plays for DJK Vilzing. He played for the youth teams of DJK Sonnen, FC Sturm Hauzenberg, 1. FC Passau, SpVgg Grün-Weiß Deggendorf, and Greuther Fürth.

== Club career ==
Steininger came to SpVgg Greuther Fürth in 2010 after having played for DJK Sonnen, Sturm Hauzenberg, 1. FC Passau and SpVgg Grün-Weiß Deggendorf as a youth player. He started at the clubs youth team, before in 2013 - although still eligible to play for the A-Jugend team - he was promoted into the second team that played in the Regionalliga Bayern. After good performances, he began training with the first team from January 2014. Shortly afterwards he signed his first professional contract until 2018.

In the summer of 2014, Steininger was loaned out to 3. Liga club SSV Jahn Regensburg until the end of the 2014–15 season in order to develop further and to gain match practice. Steininger made his professional debut for Regensburg on 2 August 2014 in a 3. Liga match against Stuttgarter Kickers. Regensburg lost the match 1–3. 25 more games followed, in which he was able to score five goals.

After his return, the attacker played mainly for the Regionalliga team, but was also used occasionally in the 2. Bundesliga. After a meniscus injury sustained in preparation for the 2019–20 season, Steininger, who had recovered, was active as a test player in friendly matches during the winter break in the training camp of 3. Liga club 1. FC Magdeburg. Steininger was then signed up and received a contract valid until June 2021.

== International career ==
On 5 March 2014, he made his debut for the German U19 as he came on in the 89th minute in a friendly against Italy.

== Honours ==
SpVgg Bayreuth

- Regionalliga Bayern: 2021–22
