= Dominik Widemann =

German footballer

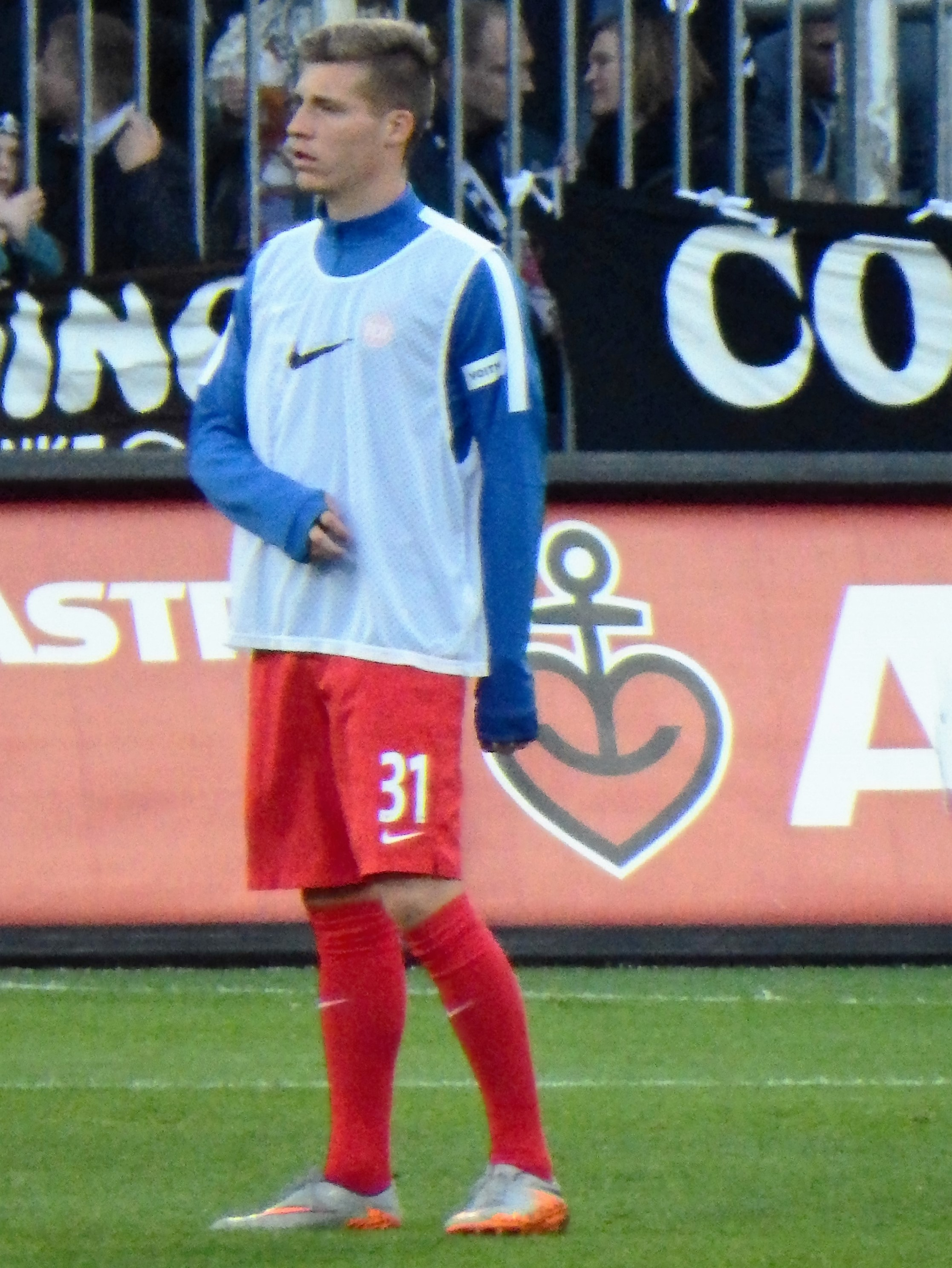
- Widemann in 2015

Personal information
- Date of birth: 30 July 1996 (age 30)
- Place of birth: Fürstenfeldbruck, Germany
- Height: 1.78 m (5 ft 10 in)
- Position: Left winger

Team information
- Current team: SC Oberweikertshofen

Youth career
- –2008: TSV Moorenweis
- 2008–2013: SC Fürstenfeldbruck
- 2014: SpVgg Unterhaching

Senior career*
Years	Team	Apps	(Gls)
2014–2015	SpVgg Unterhaching	26	(9)
2015–2018	FC Heidenheim	12	(1)
2018–2019	SpVgg Unterhaching	27	(0)
2019–2020	Würzburger Kickers	21	(2)
2020–2021	Sonnenhof Großaspach	35	(2)
2021–2022	TSV Rain am Lech	20	(2)
2022–	SC Oberweikertshofen	15	(5)
- * Club domestic league appearances and goals as of 15 October 2022

Dominik Widemann (born 30 July 1996) is a German professional footballer who plays as a forward for SC Oberweikertshofen.

== Playing career ==
=== Youth ===
Widemann started playing football with local TSV Moorenweis at the age of four. In 2008, he moved to nearby SC Fürstenfeldbruck.

=== Unterhaching ===
During the winter break of the 2013–14 season, he was signed by 3. Liga club SpVgg Unterhaching for their U19 youth team playing in Under 19 Bundesliga South/Southwest. At the end of the season his team was relegated, him making eleven appearances scoring two goals.

While preparing for the upcoming season in summer 2014, Widemann got called by head coach Christian Ziege for the 3. Liga senior team. He made his debut coming on as a substitute at the second matchday in a home 3–3 draw versus SV Wehen Wiesbaden. His first goal in a regular game he scored only three days later in an away 2–0 victory over Jahn Regensburg where he also came on as a substitute. Subsequently, he became a regular for the team, even being the second best goalscorer with seven strikes in twelve games during the first half of the campaign. In the meantime he also signed a professional contract until 2017.
