= Marco Königs =

German footballer

Personal information
- Date of birth: 25 January 1990 (age 36)
- Place of birth: Solingen, West Germany
- Height: 1.89 m (6 ft 2 in)
- Position: Striker

Team information
- Current team: Wuppertaler SV
- Number: 48

Youth career
- BV Gräfrath
- –2006: VfL Wald
- 2006–2007: TuSpo Richrath
- 2007–2009: Fortuna Düsseldorf

Senior career*
Years	Team	Apps	(Gls)
2009–2012	Fortuna Düsseldorf II	64	(21)
2012–2013	Preußen Münster	49	(9)
2013–2014	Wehen Wiesbaden	19	(0)
2015	Jahn Regensburg	15	(6)
2015–2016	Fortuna Köln	36	(16)
2016–2018	Würzburger Kickers	58	(2)
2018–2020	Hansa Rostock	31	(5)
2020	Preußen Münster	17	(2)
2020–	Wuppertaler SV	68	(19)
- * Club domestic league appearances and goals as of 22 June 2022

Marco Königs (born 25 January 1990) is a German professional footballer who plays for Wuppertaler SV.
