= Stephan Loboué =

Ivorian footballer (born 1981)

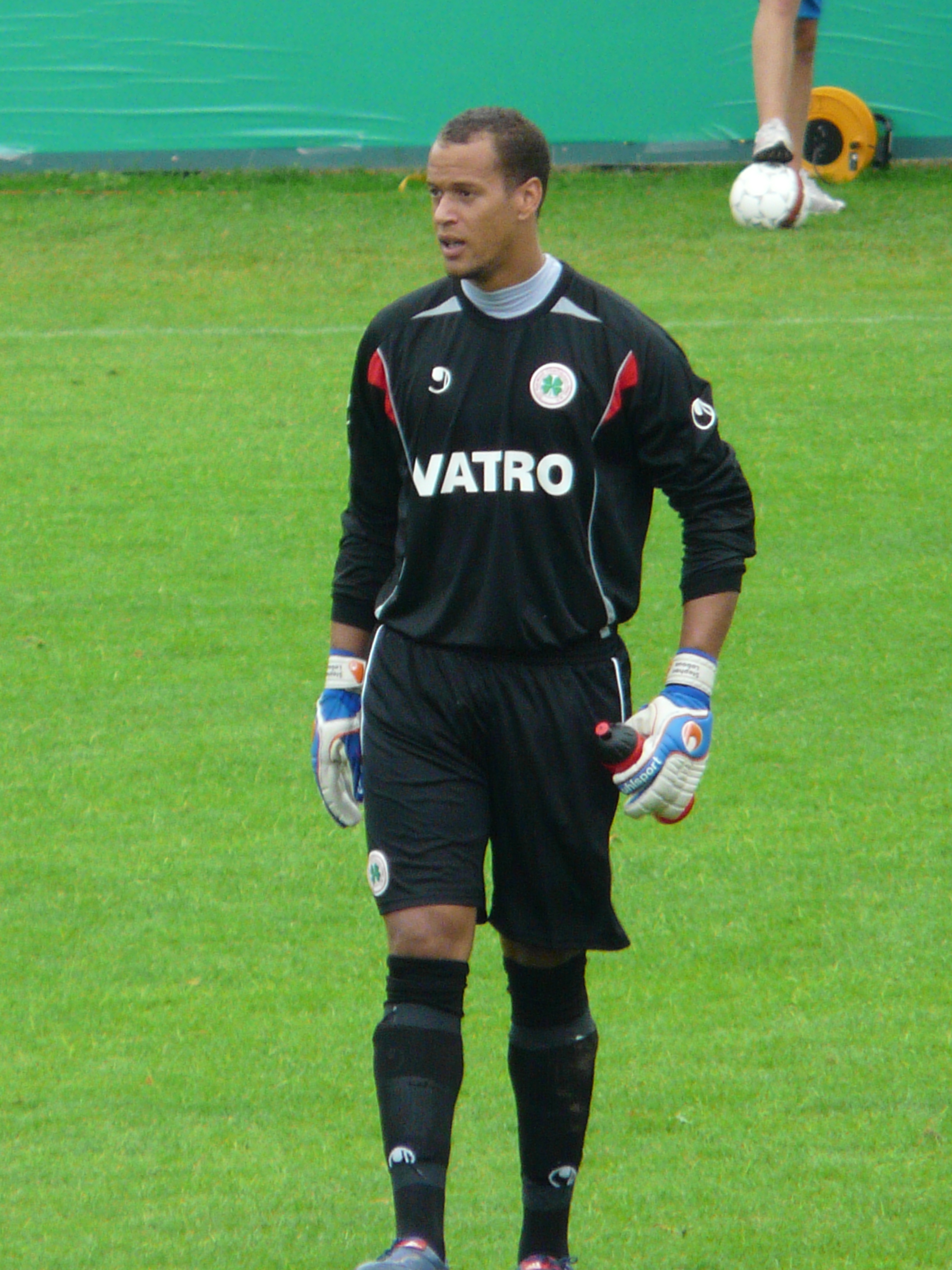
- Loboué playing for Oberhausen in 2010.

Personal information
- Full name: Stephan Raphaël Loboué
- Date of birth: 23 August 1981 (age 45)
- Place of birth: Pforzheim, West Germany
- Height: 1.94 m (6 ft 4 1/2 in)
- Position: Goalkeeper

Youth career
- 1988–1994: SV Königsbach
- 1994–1997: VfR Pforzheim
- 1997–1999: Stuttgarter Kickers

Senior career*
Years	Team	Apps	(Gls)
1999–2000	Stuttgarter Kickers II		
2000–2002	VfL Wolfsburg II	57	(0)
2002–2003	Greuther Fürth II	20	(0)
2003–2004	Greuther Fürth	10	(0)
2004–2006	SC Paderborn	35	(0)
2006–2010	Greuther Fürth	67	(0)
2010–2011	Rot-Weiß Oberhausen	0	(0)
2012	Golden Arrows	2	(0)
2012–2013	Eintracht Trier	14	(0)
2013–2014	Wacker Burghausen	35	(0)
2014–2015	Jahn Regensburg	12	(0)

International career
2006–2010	Ivory Coast	4	(0)
- * Club domestic league appearances and goals as of 28 January 2015

Stephan Raphaël Loboué (born 23 August 1981) is a professional footballer who last played as a goalkeeper for German 3. Liga side SSV Jahn Regensburg. Born in Germany, he is a former Ivorian international.

== Club career ==
Born in Pforzheim, to Ivorian parents, Loboué played in the youth of the Pforzheim clubs SV Königsbach und VfR Pforzheim, before joining Stuttgarter Kickers in 1996.

He started his senior career with the reserve team of Stuttgarter Kickers in the Verbandsliga Württemberg in 1999. He then moved to Wolfsburg's reserves, playing in the Oberliga Niedersachsen/Bremen. In 2002, he was signed by Greuther Fürth, where he played for both reserve team in the Oberliga Bayern and first team in the 2. Bundesliga. He made his 2. Bundesliga debut on 19 October 2003 against LR Ahlen, and finished the 2003–04 season with ten league appearances.

In the summer of 2004, he left Greuther Fürth for SC Paderborn 07 of the Regionalliga Nord, where he was the first-choice keeper during the 2004–05 season and helped the club winning promotion to the 2. Bundesliga. However, he only managed to make four appearances for the club in 2. Bundesliga the following season, and moved back to Greuther Fürth in the summer of 2006. He started the 2006–07 season as understudy to Fürth's Slovenian goalkeeper Borut Mavrič, but managed to win his place as a first-team regular, following Mavrič's red card against Unterhaching in December 2006, making 19 league appearances until the end of the season. Despite his solid performances, Loboué was relegated back to the bench for the 2007–08 season, after the club signed Sascha Kirschstein on loan from Hamburg for two seasons. During the 2007–08 season, Loboué's one and only league appearance came in a 1–1 away draw at SV Wehen Wiesbaden, a match for which Kirschstein was suspended, after picking up his fifth yellow card.

Loboué soon returned after some bad matches of Kirschstein, and because of his good performance over the whole 2008–09 season. He was also one of the reasons why Greuther Fürth as one of the leading teams was on the step to the top league in Germany, the Bundesliga. On 28 May 2010, he left Greuther Fürth to sign with Rot-Weiß Oberhausen.

In the summer of 2014, he joined SSV Jahn Regensburg. As Regensburg dropped to the last place in the league and the supporters were angry, Loboué caused in December 2015 a controversy by insulting the supporters. His contract was then cancelled in agreement with the club in January 2015.

== International career ==
Loboué received a call-up for Ivory Coast after the 2006 FIFA World Cup, and made his international debut on 16 August 2006 in a friendly match against Senegal, replacing the first-choice goalkeeper Boubacar Barry at half-time. He played his first full match for Ivory Coast on 17 October 2007, against Austria.

He was also part of the Ivorian squad for the 2008 African Cup of Nations. In that tournament, Loboué replaced Boubacar Barry as a substitute in the semi-final against Egypt.
