= André Mandt =

German footballer

Personal information
- Date of birth: 15 August 1993 (age 33)
- Place of birth: Cologne, Germany
- Height: 1.70 m (5 ft 7 in)
- Position: Defensive midfielder

Team information
- Current team: TuS Koblenz
- Number: 28

Youth career
- –2012: Bayer Leverkusen

Senior career*
| Years | Team | Apps | (Gls) |
| 2012–2014 | Bayer Leverkusen II | 41 | (3) |
| 2014–2016 | Saarbrücken | 35 | (2) |
| 2016–2017 | TSV Steinbach | 10 | (0) |
| 2017–2018 | Wuppertaler SV | 25 | (2) |
| 2018–2019 | Wiedenbrück 2000 | 16 | (0) |
| 2019–2021 | Wegberg-Beeck | 60 | (6) |
| 2021– | TuS Koblenz | 43 | (7) |

International career
| 2008 | Germany U16 | 1 | (1) |
- * Club domestic league appearances and goals as of 19 November 2022

André Mandt (born 15 August 1993) is a German footballer who plays for TuS Koblenz.
