= Zlatko Muhović =

Bosnian footballer

Personal information
- Date of birth: 8 November 1990 (age 36)
- Place of birth: Kragujevac, Yugoslavia
- Height: 1.87 m (6 ft 2 in)
- Position: Attacking midfielder

Team information
- Current team: Fortuna Köln (assistant)

Youth career
- –2007: Bonner SC
- 2007–2008: VfL Leverkusen
- 2008–2009: Alemannia Aachen

Senior career*
Years	Team	Apps	(Gls)
2009–2010	Alemannia Aachen II	40	(8)
2010–2012	Schalke 04 II	34	(1)
2012–2013	Wiedenbrück 2000	35	(8)
2013–2014	Preußen Münster	2	(0)
2014–2015	Jahn Regensburg	26	(2)
2015–2017	BFC Dynamo	63	(19)
2017–2018	SC Verl	27	(3)
2018–2019	SC Wiedenbrück 2000	19	(2)
2019	1. FC Kaan-Marienborn	9	(0)

Managerial career
- 2019–2023: Fortuna Köln (assistant)
- 2023–2025: SC Verl (assistant)
- 2025–2026: Preußen Münster (assistant)
- * Club domestic league appearances and goals

Zlatko Muhović (born 8 November 1990) is a retired Bosnian-Herzegovinian footballer and assistant manager.

== Playing career ==
Muhović began his career with Alemannia Aachen, and played for their reserve team for eighteen months before joining FC Schalke 04 II in 2010. Two years later he signed for SC Wiedenbrück, where he had successful season, promptly signing for SC Preußen Münster of the 3. Liga. He made his debut at this level in the second game of the 2013–14 season, as a substitute for Matt Taylor in a 2–2 draw with RB Leipzig. After two appearances in six months for Münster, he signed for SSV Jahn Regensburg in January 2014. After being suspended by the club in January 2015, his contract was cancelled on 28 January 2015.

== Coaching career ==
After retiring at the end of the 2018–19 season, SC Fortuna Köln announced, that Muhović had joined the club as assistant manager.

For the seasons 2023-24 and 2024-25 he was assistant coach for SC Verl. Together with his chef coach Alexander Ende he joined SC Preußen Münster in July 2025. Both were dismissed as coaches on 16 March 2026.
