= Mario Neunaber =

German footballer

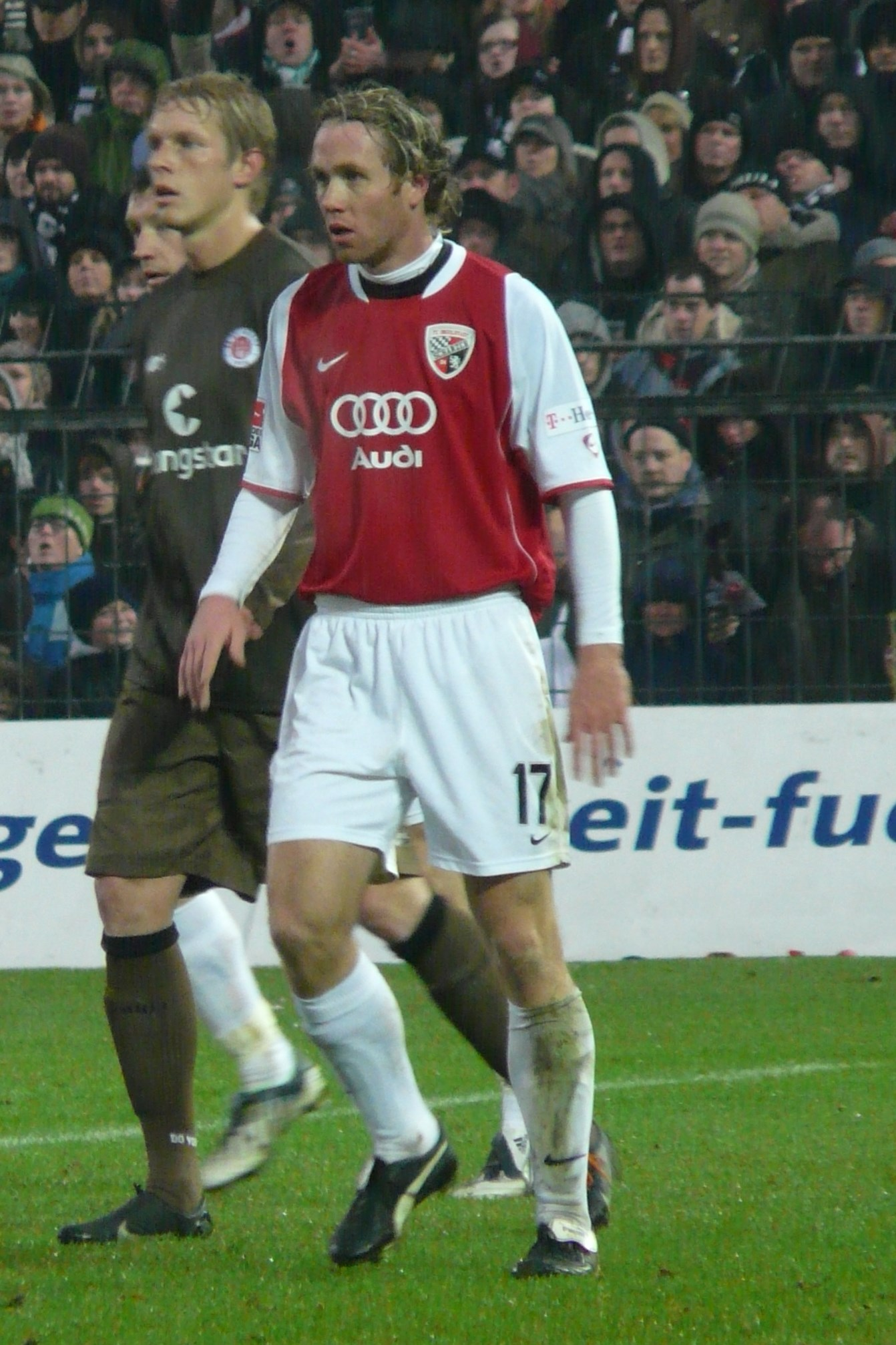
- Neunaber with FC Ingolstadt 04 in 2008

Personal information
- Date of birth: 17 March 1982 (age 44)
- Place of birth: Bremen, West Germany
- Height: 1.84 m (6 ft 0 in)
- Position: Defender

Youth career
- –1995: VfL 07 Bremen
- 1995–2001: Werder Bremen

Senior career*
| Years | Team | Apps | (Gls) |
| 2001–2003 | Werder Bremen II | 65 | (1) |
| 2004 | FC Sachsen Leipzig | 15 | (0) |
| 2004–2005 | Preußen Münster | 29 | (2) |
| 2005–2007 | Kickers Emden | 62 | (3) |
| 2007–2009 | FC Ingolstadt 04 | 52 | (4) |
| 2009–2010 | Wuppertaler SV | 27 | (2) |
| 2010–2011 | Hessen Kassel | 27 | (1) |
| 2011–2014 | Jahn Regensburg | 78 | (7) |
| 2014–2015 | Rot-Weiss Essen | 19 | (0) |
| Total | | 374 | (20) |
- * Club domestic league appearances and goals

Mario Neunaber (born 17 March 1982) is a German former professional footballer who played as a defender.

== Career ==
Born in Bremen, Neunaber is a Werder Bremen youth product.

He made his debut on the professional league level when he started in the 2. Bundesliga game for FC Ingolstadt 04 against Greuther Fürth on 17 August 2008.

In June 2014, Neunaber joined Rot-Weiss Essen. There he won the Lower Rhine Cup in 2015. By the end of that season he ended his career.
