= Jahnstadion Regensburg (1926) =

Stadium in Regensburg, Germany

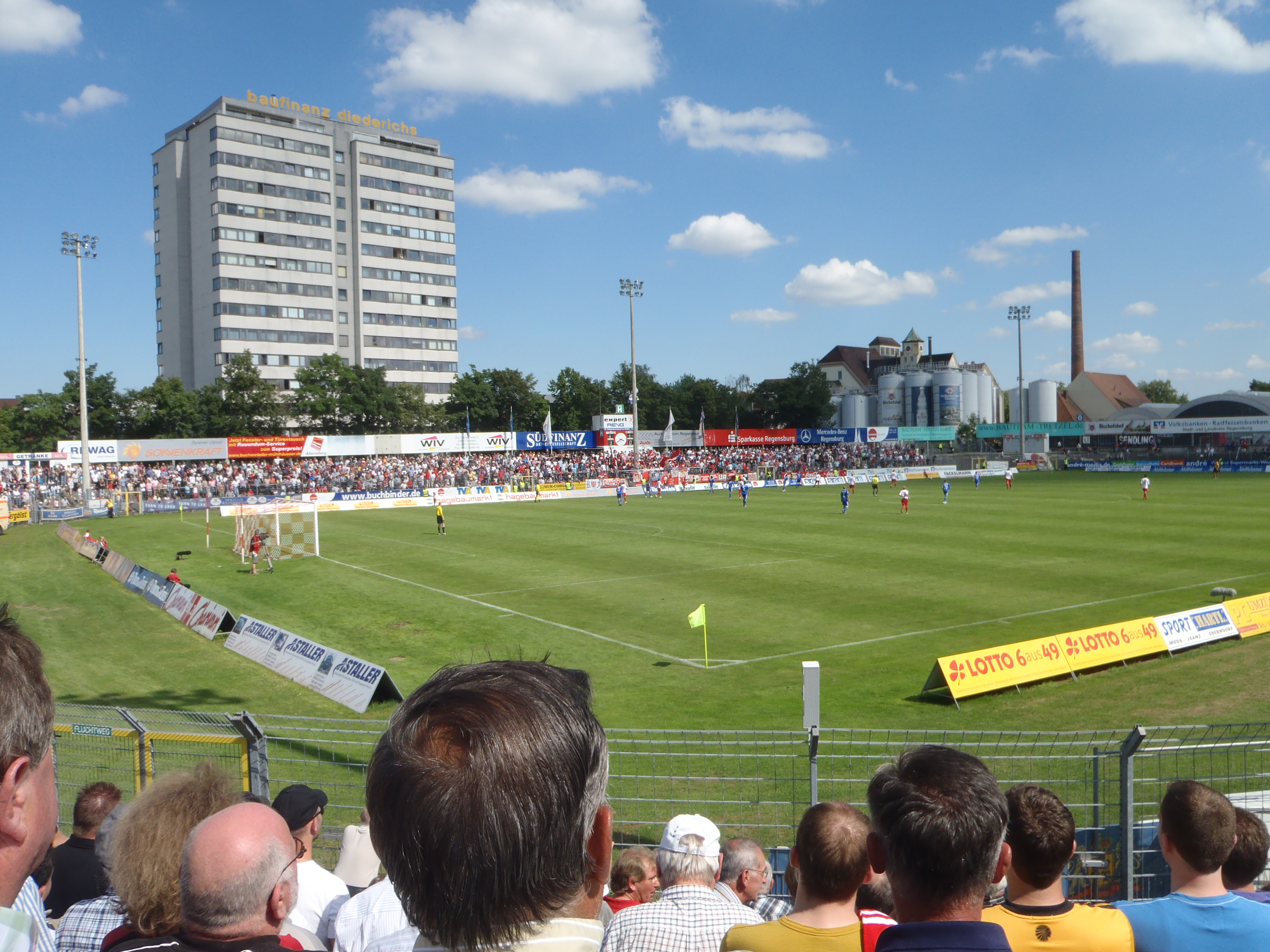
- Interactive map of Jahnstadion Regensburg
- Location: Regensburg, Germany
- Coordinates: 49°00′56″N 12°04′26″E
- Owner: City of Regensburg
- Capacity: 12,500
- Surface: Grass

Construction
- Opened: 1926
- Renovated: 1987
- Expanded: 1931, 1949, 2003, 2008, 2012
- Closed: 2015
- Demolished: 2017

Tenant
- SSV Jahn Regensburg (1926–2015)

The original Jahnstadion Regensburg was a 12,500 capacity stadium in Regensburg, Germany. Until 2015 it was primarily used for football and was the home of SSV Jahn Regensburg. Built in 1926, it also hosted five football matches during the 1972 Summer Olympics. In 2017, it was mostly demolished and replaced by apartments and a school.
