= Abdenour Amachaibou =

Professional footballer

Personal information
- Date of birth: 22 January 1987 (age 39)
- Place of birth: Düren, West Germany
- Height: 1.76 m (5 ft 9 1/2 in)
- Positions: Midfielder; forward

Team information
- Current team: SC 08 Elsdorf

Youth career
- Borussia Buir
- Blau-Weiß Kerpen
- Bayer 04 Leverkusen
- –2003: Alemannia Aachen
- 2003–2004: Borussia Dortmund

Senior career*
Years	Team	Apps	(Gls)
2004–2007	Borussia Dortmund II	29	(3)
2007–2008	Alemannia Aachen II	17	(3)
2008–2009	Fortuna Köln	2	(0)
2009	Maccabi Ironi Kiryat Ata	7	(0)
2009–2010	BFC Türkiyemspor	27	(11)
2010–2012	SpVgg Unterhaching	52	(18)
2012–2014	Jahn Regensburg	53	(13)
2014–2016	Preußen Münster	37	(1)
2016–2018	Teutonia Watzenborn-Steinberg	37	(13)
2018–2019	Stuttgarter Kickers	29	(6)
2019–	SC 08 Elsdorf	0	(0)

International career
	Germany U19	11	(5)
	Morocco U23	4	(0)
- * Club domestic league appearances and goals as of 3 August 2019

Abdenour Amachaibou (born 22 January 1987) is a professional footballer who plays for SC 08 Elsdorf. Born in Germany, he has represented both Germany and Morocco at the youth level.
