= Fabian Trettenbach =

German footballer

Personal information
- Date of birth: 17 December 1991 (age 34)
- Place of birth: Burglengenfeld, Germany
- Height: 1.76 m (5 ft 9 1/2 in)
- Position: Defender

Youth career
- –2007: Bayern Munich
- 2007–2010: 1. FC Nürnberg
- 2010: VfR Aalen

Senior career*
Years	Team	Apps	(Gls)
2010–2011	VfR Aalen	0	(0)
2011	SV Seligenporten	9	(2)
2011–2016	Jahn Regensburg	59	(3)
2016–2024	DJK Vilzing	152	(27)
- * Club domestic league appearances and goals as of 30 April 2024

Fabian Trettenbach (born 17 December 1991) is a German footballer who played most recently for DJK Vilzing. He made his debut for Regensburg on 20 July 2013 in a 3. Liga match against SpVgg Unterhaching.
