= Ruben Popa =

Romanian footballer

Personal information
- Full name: Ruben Popa
- Date of birth: 22 March 1989 (age 37)
- Place of birth: Romania
- Height: 1.72 m (5 ft 8 in)
- Position: Striker

Team information
- Current team: FSV Pfaffenhofen
- Number: 7

Youth career
- 1998–2004: FC UTA Arad
- 2004–2008: CS Național Sebiș
- 2008–2009: FC Schweitenkirchen 1946

Senior career*
Years	Team	Apps	(Gls)
2009–2014	SSV Jahn Regensburg II	100	(44)
2011–2014	SSV Jahn Regensburg	14	(0)
2015–2017	FC Pipinsried	65	(9)
2017–	FSV Pfaffenhofen	74	(31)
- * Club domestic league appearances and goals as of 29 January 2021

Ruben Popa (born 22 March 1989) is a Romanian footballer who plays for FSV Pfaffenhofen.

Popa started off his footballing career training three times a week at Romanian club FC UTA Arad, before later moving to Germany with his father. At the end of June 2009, Popa signed for SSV Jahn Regensburg II and made his professional debut for the first team during the 2011–12 3. Liga season in a 2–0 away loss to SC Preußen Münster. In summer 2013, he was promoted to the senior team.
