= Gino Windmüller =

German footballer

Personal information
- Date of birth: 20 June 1989 (age 37)
- Place of birth: Germany
- Height: 1.92 m (6 ft 3 1/2 in)
- Position: Centre back

Team information
- Current team: 1. FC Bocholt
- Number: 3

Youth career
- –2010: SV Bergisch Gladbach 09

Senior career*
Years	Team	Apps	(Gls)
2010–2011	Fortuna Düsseldorf II	19	(2)
2011–2013	SV Bergisch Gladbach 09	34	(11)
2013–2015	SSV Jahn Regensburg	59	(3)
2015–2017	Rot-Weiss Essen	46	(2)
2017–2019	Wuppertaler SV	57	(10)
2019–2022	VfR Aalen	86	(5)
2022–	1. FC Bocholt	22	(1)
- * Club domestic league appearances and goals as of 25 April 2024

Gino Windmüller (born 20 June 1989) is a German footballer who plays for 1. FC Bocholt. He made his professional debut for Regensburg on 20 July 2013 in a 3. Liga match against SpVgg Unterhaching.
