= Patrick Lienhard =

German footballer

Personal information
- Full name: Jim-Patrick Lienhard
- Date of birth: 30 May 1992 (age 34)
- Place of birth: Gengenbach, Germany
- Height: 1.69 m (5 ft 7 in)
- Position: Midfielder

Youth career
- –2005: SV Berghaupten
- 2005–2011: SC Freiburg

Senior career*
Years	Team	Apps	(Gls)
2011–2013	SC Freiburg II	44	(4)
2013–2014	SVN Zweibrücken	28	(7)
2014–2015	Jahn Regensburg	23	(2)
2015–2017	Eintracht Trier	62	(14)
2017–2022	FC Homburg	120	(19)
2022–2026	SC Freiburg II	78	(4)
Total		355	(50)
- * Club domestic league appearances and goals

Jim-Patrick Lienhard (born 30 May 1992) is a former German footballer who played as a midfielder.

== Career ==
Lienhard made his professional debut for Jahn Regensburg in the 3. Liga on 26 July 2014, starting in the home match against MSV Duisburg, which finished as a 3–1 win.
