= Thomas Kurz =

German footballer

Personal information
- Full name: Thomas Kurz
- Date of birth: 3 April 1988 (age 38)
- Place of birth: Altötting, West Germany
- Height: 1.89 m (6 ft 2 in)
- Position: Midfielder

Youth career
- 1992–2003: SV 1963 Unterneukirchen
- 2003–2005: Bayern Munich
- 2005–2007: Wacker Burghausen

Senior career*
Years	Team	Apps	(Gls)
2007–2010	Wacker Burghausen	59	(10)
2010–2011	Bayern Munich II	30	(1)
2011–2016	Jahn Regensburg	86	(11)
2016–2019	FC Ingolstadt II	51	(3)
- * Club domestic league appearances and goals as of 13:35, 27 January 2021 (UTC)

Thomas Kurz (born 3 April 1988) is a German professional footballer who plays as a midfielder.

== Career ==
Born in Altötting, Kurz began his career with SV 1963 Unterneukirchen, before joining Bayern Munich in 2003. After two years in Bayern's junior team, he moved on to SV Wacker Burghausen, where he came through the youth team, making his debut in 2007 as a substitute for Thomas Neubert in a 1–0 win over Karlsruher SC II. He played 23 games in the Regionalliga Süd, scoring three goals as the team qualified for the new 3. Liga. In two years at that level he played 36 games, scoring seven goals, before returning to FC Bayern in July 2010, to play for their reserve team. Initially he played in his usual position as a striker, but with the increased competition with the arrival of Marcos Alvarez and Steffen Wohlfarth in January 2011, he was often deployed as a central defender. He was released by Bayern at the end of the 2010–11 season after their relegation from the third tier and joined SSV Jahn Regensburg on 21 July 2011. In his first season with Regensburg, he helped them win promotion to the 2. Bundesliga after a playoff victory over Karlsruher SC.
