= Jim-Patrick Müller =

German footballer (born 1989)

Personal information
- Full name: Jim-Patrick Müller
- Date of birth: 4 August 1989 (age 37)
- Place of birth: Munich, West Germany
- Height: 1.82 m (6 ft 0 in)
- Position: Midfielder

Team information
- Current team: DJK Vilzing
- Number: 10

Youth career
- TSV Roth
- –2007: SC 04 Schwabach
- 2007–2008: Greuther Fürth

Senior career*
Years	Team	Apps	(Gls)
2008–2011	Greuther Fürth II	97	(16)
2011–2014	Jahn Regensburg	89	(17)
2014–2015	SV Sandhausen	0	(0)
2015–2016	Dynamo Dresden	28	(1)
2016–2021	SpVgg Unterhaching	94	(17)
2021–	DJK Vilzing	114	(41)
- * Club domestic league appearances and goals as of 1 January 2025

Jim-Patrick Müller (born 4 August 1989) is a German professional footballer who plays for DJK Vilzing.

Müller's father, Bernd Müller, and grandfather, Heini Müller, were also footballers.

Müller made his professional debut for SSV Jahn Regensburg in the opening fixture of the 2011–12 3. Liga season at home to SV Babelsberg 03.
