= Romas Dressler =

German footballer

Personal information
- Date of birth: 16 October 1987 (age 39)
- Place of birth: Ebersberg, West Germany
- Height: 1.89 m (6 ft 2 in)
- Position: Forward

Youth career
- ATSV Kirchseeon
- 1860 Munich
- SpVgg Unterhaching
- –2006: Hamburger SV

Senior career*
Years	Team	Apps	(Gls)
2006–2007	Hamburger SV II	16	(0)
2007–2008	Olba		
2008	Lucchese		
2008–2009	Greuther Fürth II	31	(15)
2009–2010	Wuppertaler SV	22	(4)
2010–2011	Chemnitzer FC II	15	(12)
2010–2011	Chemnitzer FC	8	(2)
2012–2013	Wormatia Worms	34	(13)
2013–2015	Jahn Regensburg	23	(6)
2014	Jahn Regensburg II	2	(1)
2015	Eintracht Trier	13	(5)
2015–2017	FC Kray	33	(9)
2017	1. FC Bocholt	10	(2)
Total		207	(69)
- * Club domestic league appearances and goals

Romas Dressler (born 16 October 1987) is a German former professional footballer who played as a forward. He played for Hamburger SV II, Olba, Lucchese, Greuther Fürth II, Wuppertaler SV Borussia, Chemnitzer FC, Wormatia Worms, SSV Jahn Regensburg, SV Eintracht Trier 05 and FC Kray.
