= Marcel Baude =

German footballer

Personal information
- Full name: Marcel Baude
- Date of birth: 5 October 1989 (age 37)
- Place of birth: East Germany
- Height: 1.79 m (5 ft 10 in)
- Position: Right-back

Youth career
- –1999: TSV Flöha
- 1999–2008: Chemnitzer FC

Senior career*
Years	Team	Apps	(Gls)
2008–2013	Chemnitzer FC II	70	(9)
2010–2013	Chemnitzer FC	4	(0)
2013–2016	Hallescher FC	65	(1)
2016–2019	Energie Cottbus	47	(2)
2019–2020	VfB Auerbach	17	(0)
- * Club domestic league appearances and goals as of 19:16, 27 February 2023 (UTC)

Marcel Baude (born 5 October 1989) is a German footballer who plays as a right-back.

== Career ==
Baude came through Chemnitzer FC's youth and reserve ranks, and made his debut in a 6–0 win over VfB Lübeck in September 2010, as a substitute for Ronny Garbuschewski. This was to be his only first-team appearance of the season, as Chemnitz won the Regionalliga Nord title. His next appearance was in the 3. Liga, over a year later, when he replaced Benjamin Förster in the last minute of a 2–1 win over Wacker Burghausen. He signed for Hallescher FC in July 2013.
