= Daniel Franziskus =

German footballer

Personal information
- Date of birth: 13 August 1991 (age 35)
- Place of birth: Aurich, Germany
- Height: 1.80 m (5 ft 11 in)
- Position: Forward

Team information
- Current team: VfB Lübeck (scout & coach)

Youth career
- –2008: Werder Bremen
- 2008–2010: VfB Oldenburg

Senior career*
Years	Team	Apps	(Gls)
2010–2011	VfB Oldenburg	25	(8)
2011–2013	SV Wilhelmshaven	35	(2)
2013	TuS Pewsum		
2013–2015	Jahn Regensburg II	19	(4)
2013–2015	Jahn Regensburg	28	(4)
2015–2016	TSG Neustrelitz	30	(2)
2016–2018	VfB Oldenburg	50	(21)
2018–2019	VfB Lübeck	26	(13)
- * Club domestic league appearances and goals

Daniel Franziskus (born 13 August 1991) is a German retired professional footballer who played as a forward. He works as a scout and is a part of the coaching team at VfB Lübeck.

== Career ==
Franziskus made his professional debut for Regensburg on 7 September 2013 in a 3. Liga match against 1. FC Saarbrücken.

== Later career ==
On 10 October 2019, 28-year old Franziskus announced his retirement after a long knee injury, where he was told, that he could never play football with his knee again. On 14 November 2019 VfB Lübeck confirmed, that Franziskus had been hired as a scout and in the coaching team of the Regionalliga Nord side.
