= Andreas Güntner =

German footballer

Personal information
- Date of birth: 21 July 1988 (age 38)
- Place of birth: Regensburg, West Germany
- Height: 1.86 m (6 ft 1 in)
- Position: Defender

Team information
- Current team: BFC Dynamo

Youth career
- SC Regensburg
- –2003: TSV Kareth-Lappersdorf
- 2007–2008: SSV Jahn Regensburg

Senior career*
Years	Team	Apps	(Gls)
2007–2009	SSV Jahn Regensburg	2	(0)
2009–2013	University of Memphis		
2013–2015	SSV Jahn Regensburg II	15	(0)
2013–2015	SSV Jahn Regensburg	58	(4)
2015–2016	BFC Dynamo	29	(1)
- * Club domestic league appearances and goals as of 23:18, 2 November 2020 (UTC)

Andreas Güntner (born 21 July 1988) is a German footballer who plays as a defender.

== Career ==
He made his professional debut for Regensburg on 26 July 2008 in a 3. Liga match against Carl Zeiss Jena.
