= Markus Smarzoch =

German footballer

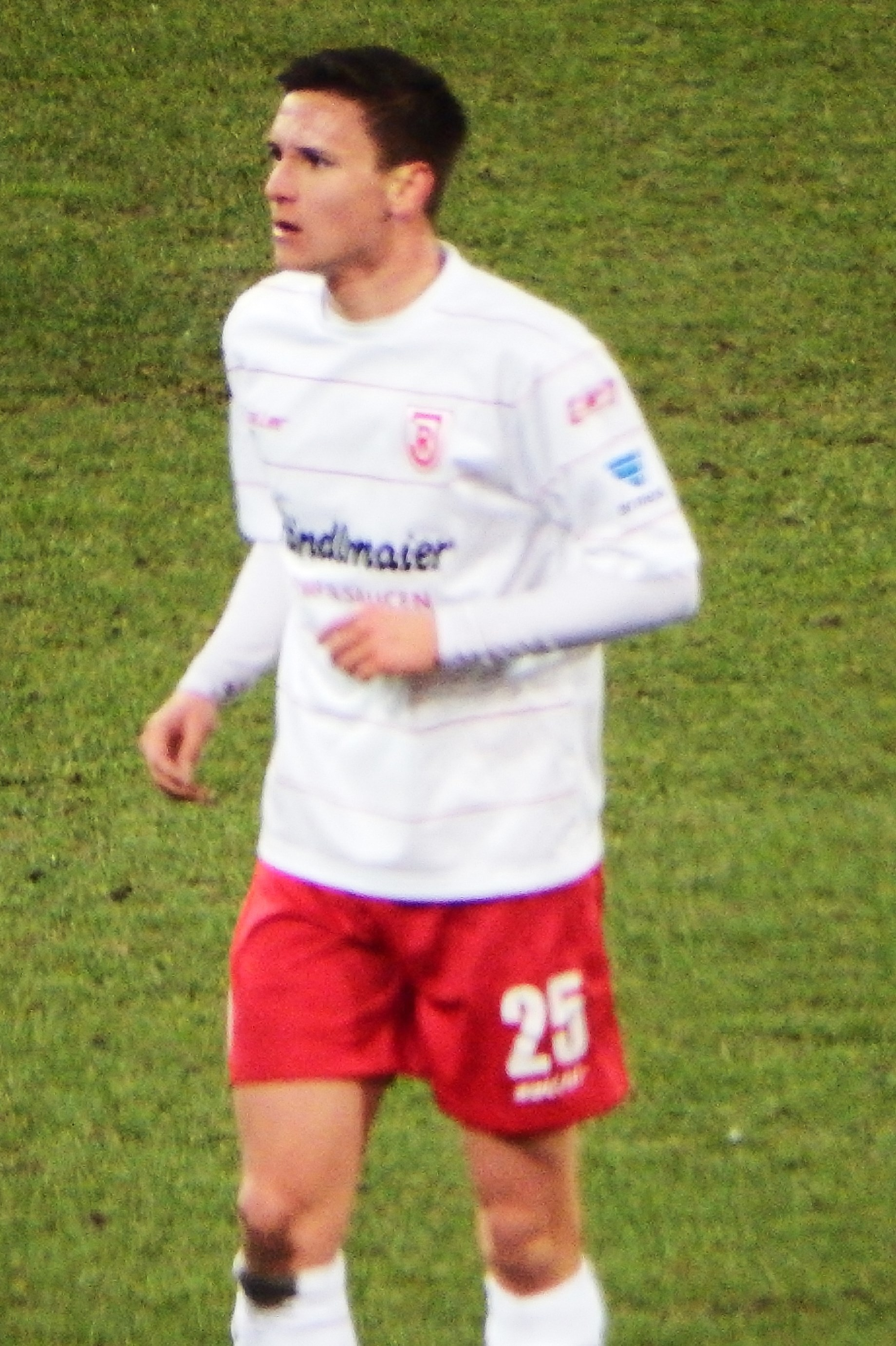

Personal information
- Full name: Markus Smarzoch
- Date of birth: 14 April 1990 (age 36)
- Place of birth: Freising, Germany
- Height: 1.83 m (6 ft 0 in)
- Position: Forward

Team information
- Current team: FV Illertissen
- Number: 14

Youth career
- –2007: Jahn Regensburg
- 2007–2008: SC Regensburg

Senior career*
Years	Team	Apps	(Gls)
2008–2011	Freier TuS Regensburg	40	(14)
2011	Jahn Regensburg II	38	(19)
2011–2015	Jahn Regensburg	39	(2)
2015–2016	SV Rödinghausen	22	(1)
2016	TSV Bogen	4	(1)
2016–2017	FC Viehhausen	16	(12)
2017–2018	ASV Neumarkt	28	(10)
2018	Palm Beach United		
2018–2019	ASV Neumarkt	3	(0)
2019–2020	Chattanooga FC		
2020–	FV Illertissen	0	(0)
- * Club domestic league appearances and goals as of 13:19, 10 February 2021 (UTC)

Markus Smarzoch (born 14 April 1990) is a German footballer who currently plays for ASV Burglengenfeld.

Smarzoch made his professional debut for SSV Jahn Regensburg during the 2011–12 3. Liga season away to Kickers Offenbach.
