= TSV Uetersen =

German association football club

- Full name: Turn- und Sportverein Uetersen von 1898 e.V.
- Founded: 1898
- Ground: Rosenstadion
- Capacity: 6,000
- League: Kreisklasse Hamburg 6 (X)
- 2016–17: Kreisklasse B Hamburg 5 (XI), 5th (promoted)
- Website: https://www.tsv-uetersen.de
Home colours	Away colours

TSV Uetersen is a German association football club from the city of Uetersen, Schleswig-Holstein. The club has its origins in the 1864 founding of the gymnastics club Turnverein Eintracht Uetersen. The association was lost in 1880 before being reestablished on 18 September 1884. It took on the name Uetersener Turn- und Sport 1884 on 18 September 1909 before becoming part of the newly formed club Sportverein Uetersen in March 1912. The football department became independent on 21 November 1920 before going bankrupt sometime early in 1926. A resurrected club playing as Verein fur Rasensport Uetersen was formed on 14 March 1926. Throughout this period the club played as anonymous local side.

== Postwar history ==
Following World War II VfR merged with Uetersener TS and Freie Turnerschaft Uetersen to create Uetersener Turn- und Sportverein on 3 February 1946. Predecessor FT was formed in 1900 as Arbeiter TV Uetersen, but as a workers' club had been banned as politically unpalatable by the Nazi regime in 1933.

The merger appears to have been ill-conceived as it almost immediately failed. Members of TS and FT established themselves as TSV Uetersen 1898 on 14 February without the participation of VfR or the footballers. However, early in 1947, both VfR and the wayward football department came around to join TSV.

The team went on to become a fixture in the Amateurliga Hamburg between 1950 and 1963, capturing a title there in 1957. In the 1954 and 1955 seasons Uetersen qualified to take part in the German national amateur championship, but failed to advance out of the preliminary group stage.

After the formation of the Bundesliga in 1963, the country's lower leagues were reorganized and TSV became part of what was now the Landesliga Hamburg where they would play until being sent down in 1970. During this period the club won 15 district championships, including 11 consecutive titles. The team languished in lower tier local play over the next three decades. A victory by FC St. Pauli II over Holstein Kiel II at the end of the 2008–09 season handed TSV a second-place finish in the Landesliga Hamburg (V) and allowed the club to advance to the Oberliga Hamburg which became a fifth tier circuit with the formation of the 3. Liga that year. After relegation from the Oberliga the club played once more in the Landesliga until 2015–16 when the team was withdrawn from the league during the season, restarting in the lowest league, Kreisklasse B (XI) for 2016–17.

As of 2009 the sports club has about 2,800 members and is the largest sports club in Uetersen. In addition to its football side it has departments for basketball, boxing, dance, gymnastics, handball, Judo, table tennis, and volleyball.

== Honours ==
- Amateurliga Hamburg: 1957
- Bezirksklasse Hamburg-Germania: 1950
