= Benedikt Schmid =

German footballer

Personal information
- Full name: Benedikt Schmid
- Date of birth: 19 November 1990 (age 35)
- Place of birth: Waldkirchen, Germany
- Height: 1.83 m (6 ft 0 in)
- Position: Striker

Youth career
- –2008: TSV Waldkirchen
- 2008–2009: Jahn Regensburg

Senior career*
Years	Team	Apps	(Gls)
2009–2010	1. FC Bad Kötzting	20	(6)
2010–2015	Jahn Regensburg II	54	(31)
2011–2015	Jahn Regensburg	33	(3)
2015–2017	DJK Vilzing	16	(2)
2017–2018	FC Tegernheim	8	(1)
- * Club domestic league appearances and goals as of 20:32, 1 July 2018 (UTC)

Benedikt Schmid (born 19 November 1990 in Waldkirchen) is a German footballer.

Schmid came through the youth ranks of TSV Waldkirchen before moving to SSV Jahn Regensburg. In 2009, he signed for 1. FC Bad Kötzting, scoring six goals in 20 appearances, but couldn't help the team from being relegated from the Bayernliga. A year later, after completing his Zivildienst, Schmid moved back to Regensburg where he made his professional debut in the 3. Liga in 2011. After four years, he left for DJK Vilzing.
