= Azur Velagić =

Bosnian footballer

Personal information
- Date of birth: 20 October 1991 (age 35)
- Place of birth: Munich, Germany
- Height: 1.88 m (6 ft 2 in)
- Position: Centre back

Team information
- Current team: TSV Landsberg
- Number: 8

Youth career
- Bayern Munich
- SC Fürstenfeldbruck

Senior career*
Years	Team	Apps	(Gls)
2008–2011	Olimpik Sarajevo	22	(0)
2011–2013	Ingolstadt 04 II	54	(0)
2011–2013	FC Ingolstadt 04	0	(0)
2013–2015	Jahn Regensburg	28	(0)
2015–2016	FC Homburg	18	(1)
2016–2019	SV Rödinghausen	62	(5)
2019–2021	Türkgücü München	22	(0)
2021–2023	SGV Freiberg	59	(0)
2023–2024	Türkgücü München	11	(0)
2024–	TSV Landsberg	1	(0)

International career
–2009	Bosnia and Herzegovina U-19	3	(0)
- * Club domestic league appearances and goals as of 20 July 2024

Azur Velagić (born 20 October 1991) is a professional footballer who plays for German Bayernliga club TSV Landsberg. Born in Germany, he represented Bosnia and Herzegovina on junior levels.

== Club career ==
Velagić made his debut for Regensburg on 20 July 2013 in a 3. Liga match against SpVgg Unterhaching. He left Türkgücü München for SGV Freiberg in February 2021.
