= Abd al-Fattah =

ʻAbd al-Fattāḥ (ALA-LC romanization of Arabic: عبد الفتاح) is a Muslim male given name, and in modern usage, surname. It is built from the Arabic words ʻabd and al-Fattāḥ, one of the names of God in the Qur'an, which give rise to the Muslim theophoric names.

People with this name include:

== Given name ==
- Abd al-Fattah Abu Ghudda
- Abd al-Fattah Fumani
- Abdel Fattah Yahya Ibrahim Pasha (1876–1951), Egyptian politician
- Abdelfattah Amr, also known as F. D. Amr Bey (1910–after 1972), Egyptian diplomat and squash player
- Abdul Fattah Ismail (1939–1986), Yemeni politician
- Abdul Fatah Younis (1944–2011), Libyan soldier and politician
- Abdelfattah Kilito (born 1945), Moroccan writer
- Ahmed Salah Abdelfatah (born 1949), Dutch actor
- Mohamed Abdelwahab Abdelfattah (born 1962), Egyptian composer
- Abdulfatah Ahmed (born 1963), Nigerian banker and politician
- Essam Abd El Fatah (born 1965), Egyptian football referee
- Mohamed Abdelfatah (wrestler) (born 1978), Egyptian wrestler
- Hassan Abdel Fattah (born 1982), Jordanian footballer
- Abdul Fattah Al Agha (born 1984), Syrian footballer
- Abdoul-Fatah Mustafa (born 1984), Cameroonian footballer
- Abdul Fatawu Dauda (born 1985), Ghanaian footballer
- Basel Abdoulfattakh (born 1990), Russian footballer
- Abdoul Fatah (Malagasy politician)
- Alaa Abd El-Fatah, Egyptian blogger and activist
- Samih Abdel Fattah Iskandar
- Samir Abdel Fattah, Yemeni short story writer, novelist and playwright
- Abdel Fattah al-Burhan, Sudanese military officer and politician
- Abdel Fattah el-Sisi, Egyptian military officer and politician
- Abdolfattah Soltani, Iranian human rights lawyer
- Abdul-Fattah Abu-Abdullah Adelabu, Nigerian scholar of Islamic and Arabic Studies, linguist, jurist and lecturer
- Abdul Fatah (1925 – 2010), Indonesian military officer and politician

== Surname ==
- Randa Abdel-Fattah (born 1979), Australian writer
- Israa Abdel Fatah, (born 1978), Egyptian internet activist and blogger
