= Jibla =

Jibla or Jiblah (Arabic: جِبْلَة) may refer to:

- Jibla, Kuwait, a historic area of Kuwait City
- Jibla, Yemen, a town in south-western Yemen, close to Ibb

== See also ==
- Jableh, a Syrian city on the coast of the Mediterranean
