= Qubbat az-Zum Mosque =

Historic mosque in Jibla, Yemen

Masjid Qubbat az-Zūm Masjid Qubbat Bayt az-Zūm
- Arabic: مَسْجِد قُبَّة ٱلزُّوْم; Arabic: مَسْجِد قُبَّة بَيْت ٱلزُّوْم
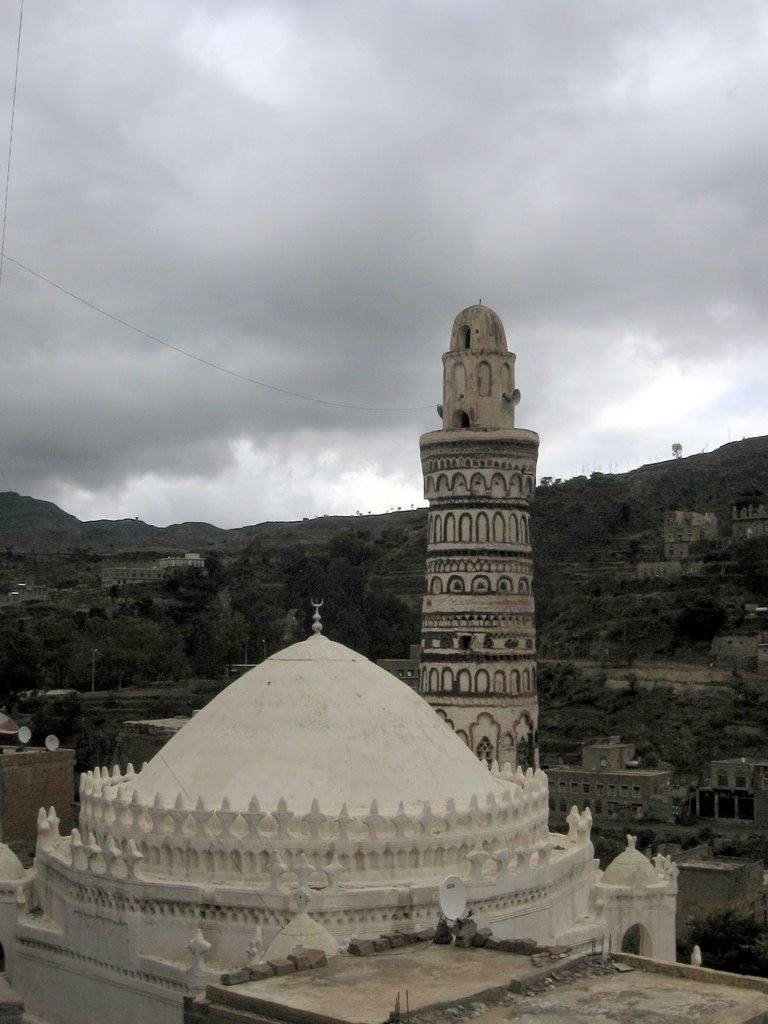

- Location in Yemen

Religion
- Affiliation: Islam
- Region: South Arabia

Location
- Location: Jibla, Yemen
- Country: Yemen
- Interactive map of Masjid Qubbat az-Zūm; Masjid Qubbat Bayt az-Zūm
- Coordinates: 13°55′23.37″N 44°8′52.94″E

Architecture
- Style: Yemeni-Islamic architecture
- Established: 16th century

The Qubbat az-Zum Mosque (Arabic: مَسْجِد قُبَّة ٱلزُّوْم, romanized: Masjid Qubbat az-Zūm; Arabic: مَسْجِد قُبَّة بَيْت ٱلزُّوْم, romanized: Masjid Qubbat Bayt az-Zūm) is a historical mosque and tourist attraction located in the Yemeni town of Jiblah. It was built in the 16th century by a man named Sheikh Ya'qub.

== Names ==
The mosque is also known as the Qubbat Bayt az-Zum Mosque, and is also named the Qubbat ash-Sheikh Ya'qub az-Zum Mosque after its builder.

== History ==
According to an inscription present on the mihrab, the mosque was built in 921 AH (1515–1516 in the Gregorian calendar). The architect of the mosque was Muhammad ibn Idris al-Habshi. The builder of the mosque was a certain Sheikh Ya'qub, who allocated a document that contained the lands and properties that were endowed for the mosque as well as indicated all the expenses and services.

== Purpose ==
The mosque is still used for prayers to this day. It is one of the tourist attractions of the historic city of Jibla.

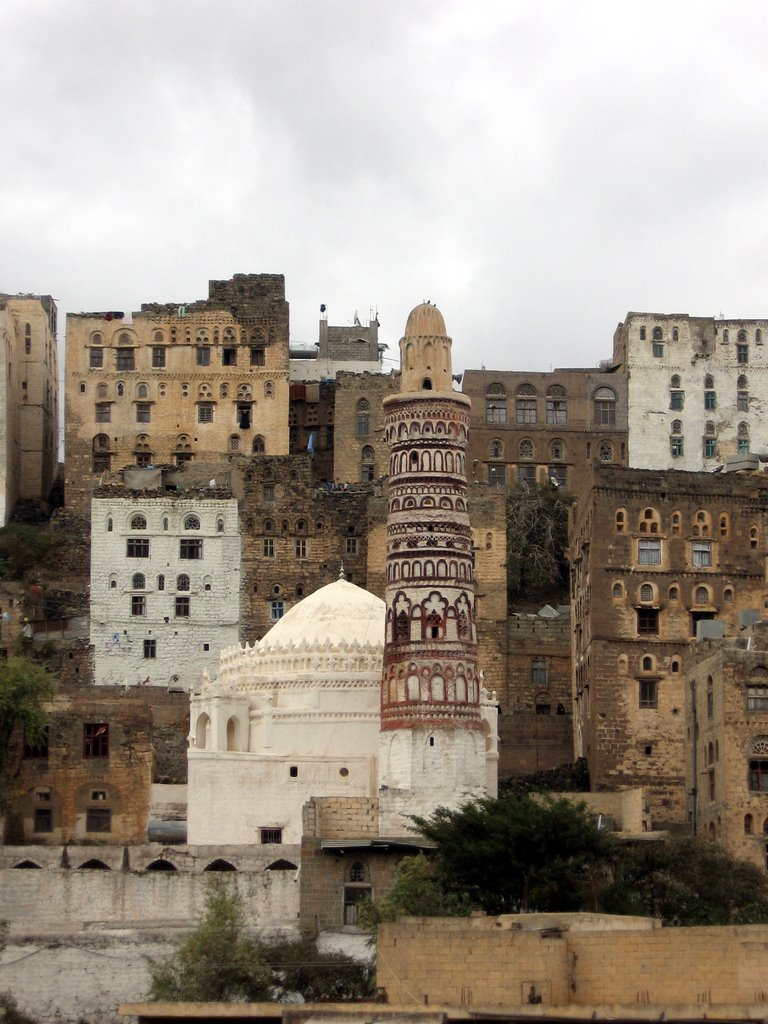
A more complete look at the mosque

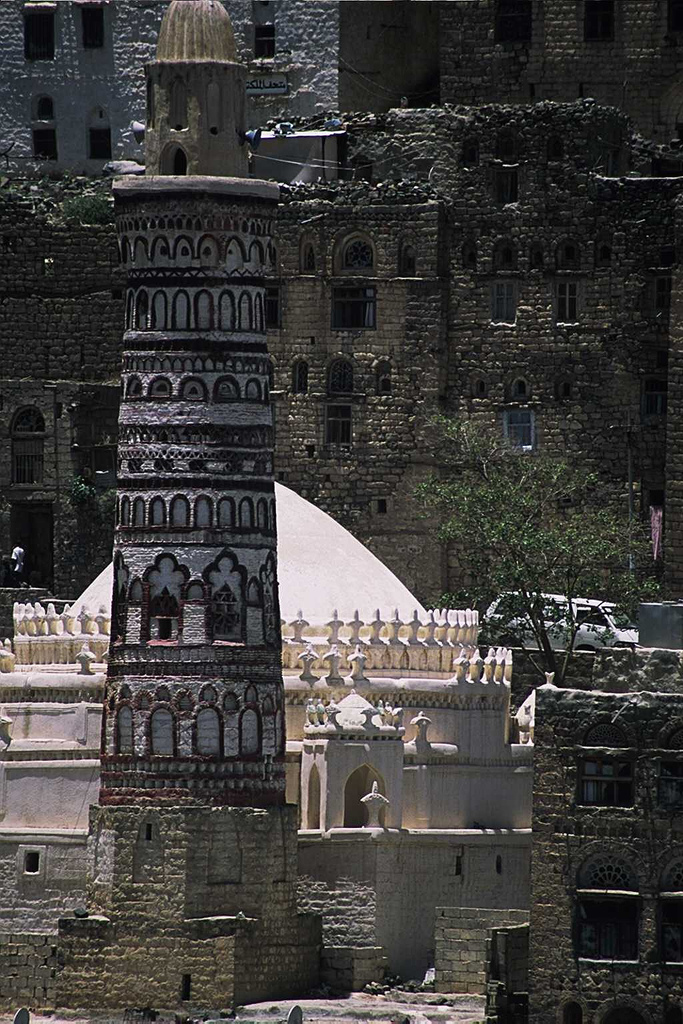
Closer look at the mosque's minaret

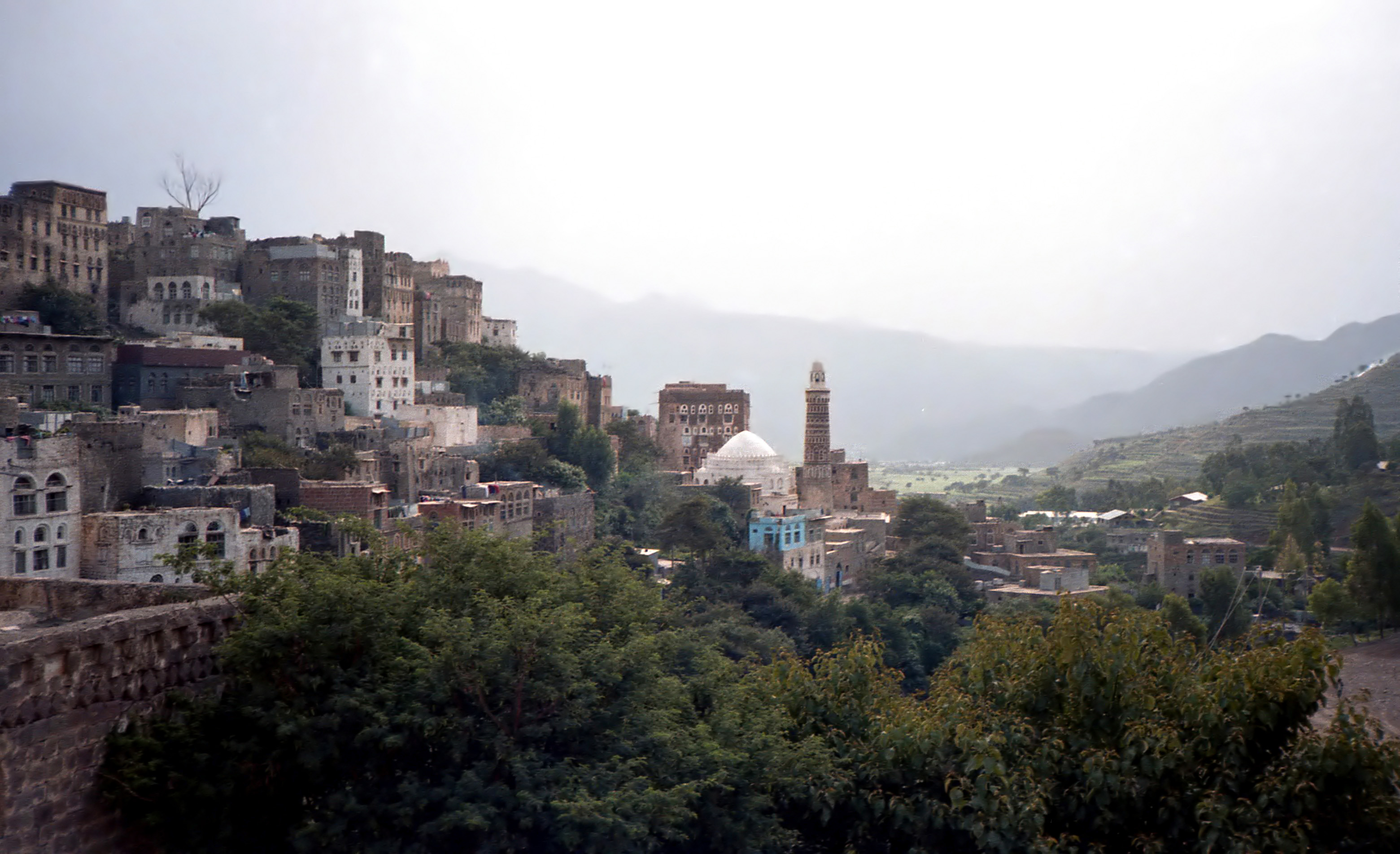
The mosque in the landscape of Jibla

== See also ==
- South Arabia
  - List of mosques in Yemen
