= Palace of Queen Arwa =

- قَصْر ٱلْمَلِكَة ٱلْحُرَّة (Arabic)
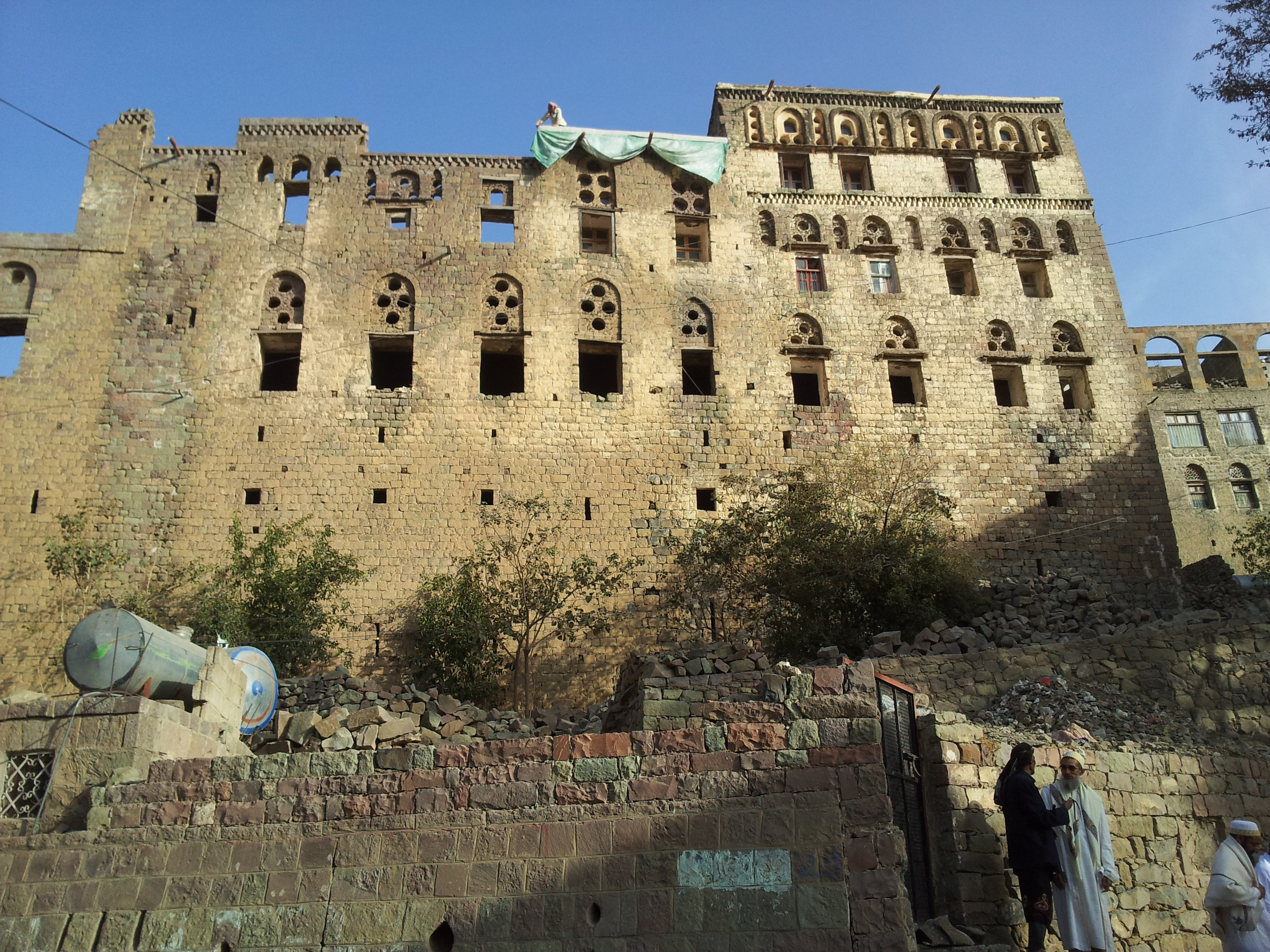
- Interactive map of Palace of Queen Arwa
- 13°55′25″N 44°8′50″E
- Location: Jibla, Yemen, Yemen

Site notes
- Architectural style: Islamic architecture

The Palace of Queen Arwa (Arabic: قَصْر ٱلْمَلِكَة ٱلْحُرَّة, lit. 'Palace of the Noble Queen') was the residence of the Yemeni Queen Arwa al-Sulayhi, who ruled in the 11th century CE. It is located in the town of Jibla. The palace is today in a ruined state, although there are efforts to restore it. As the report submitted by Min. of Culture - General Organization for the Preservation of Historic Cities - President Office to UNESCO, the extensive ruins of the Queen's Palace had 365 rooms.

== Gallery ==
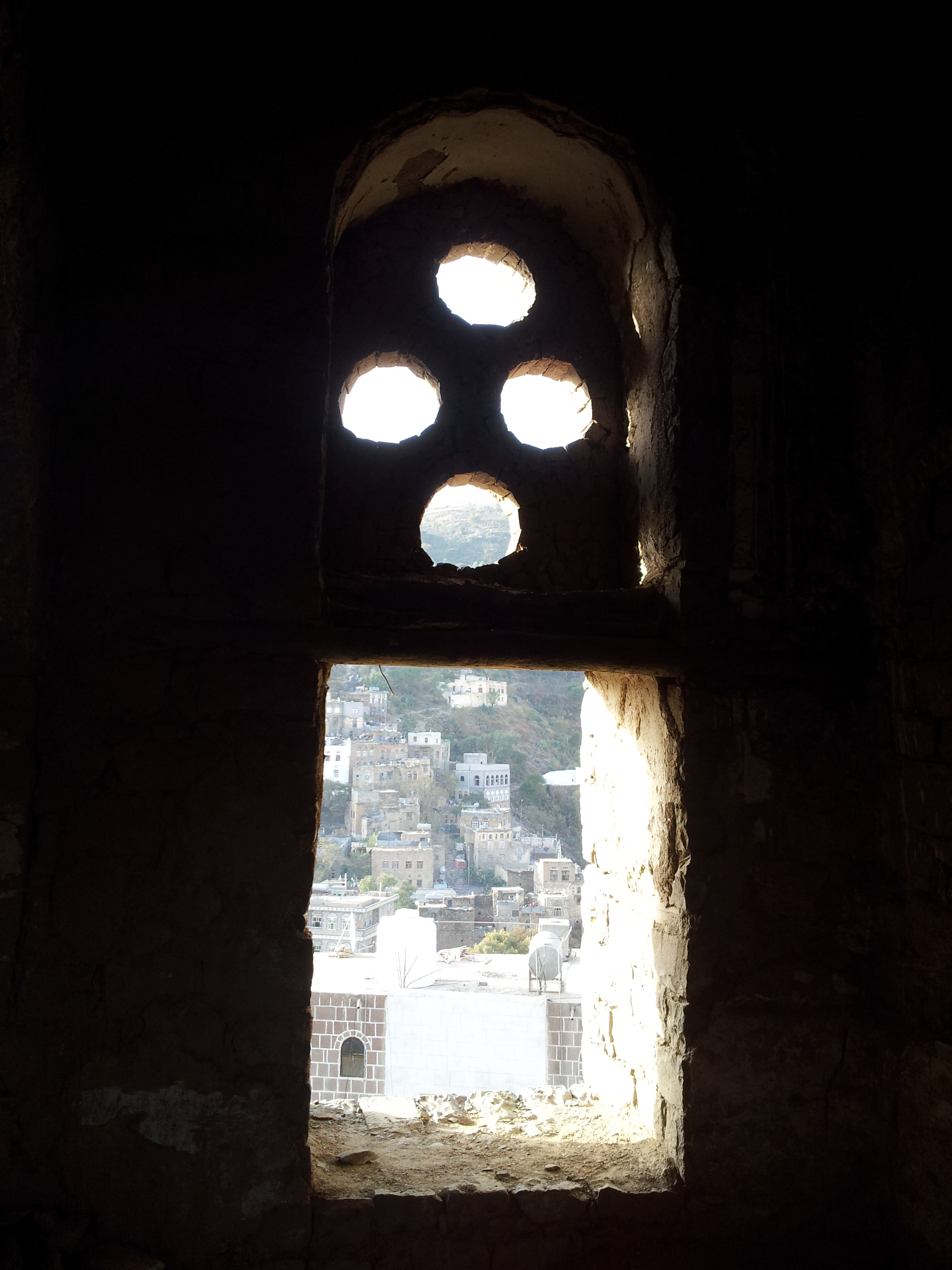
Window at Queen Arwa's Palace

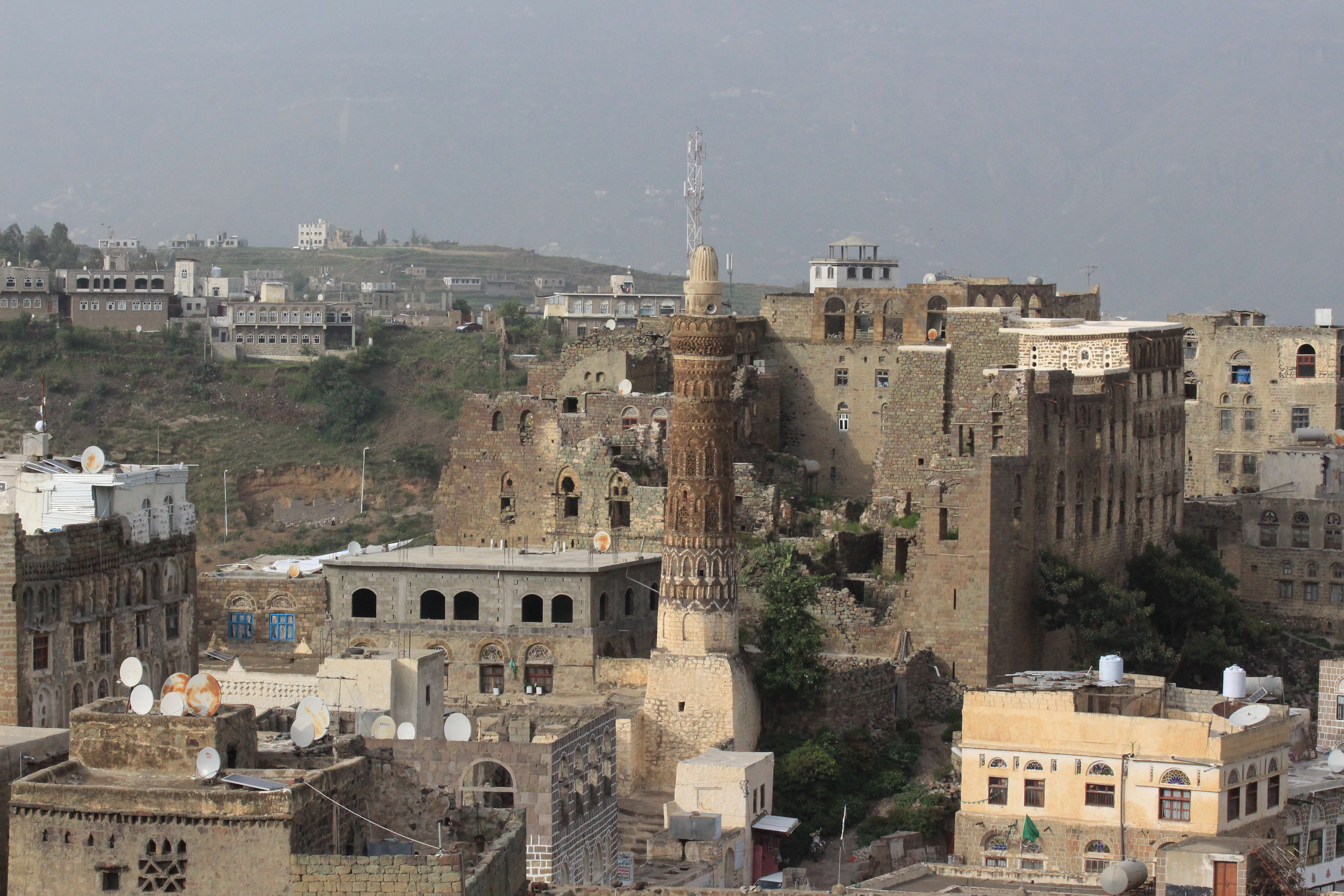
Queen Arwa's Mosque, as seen from the palace

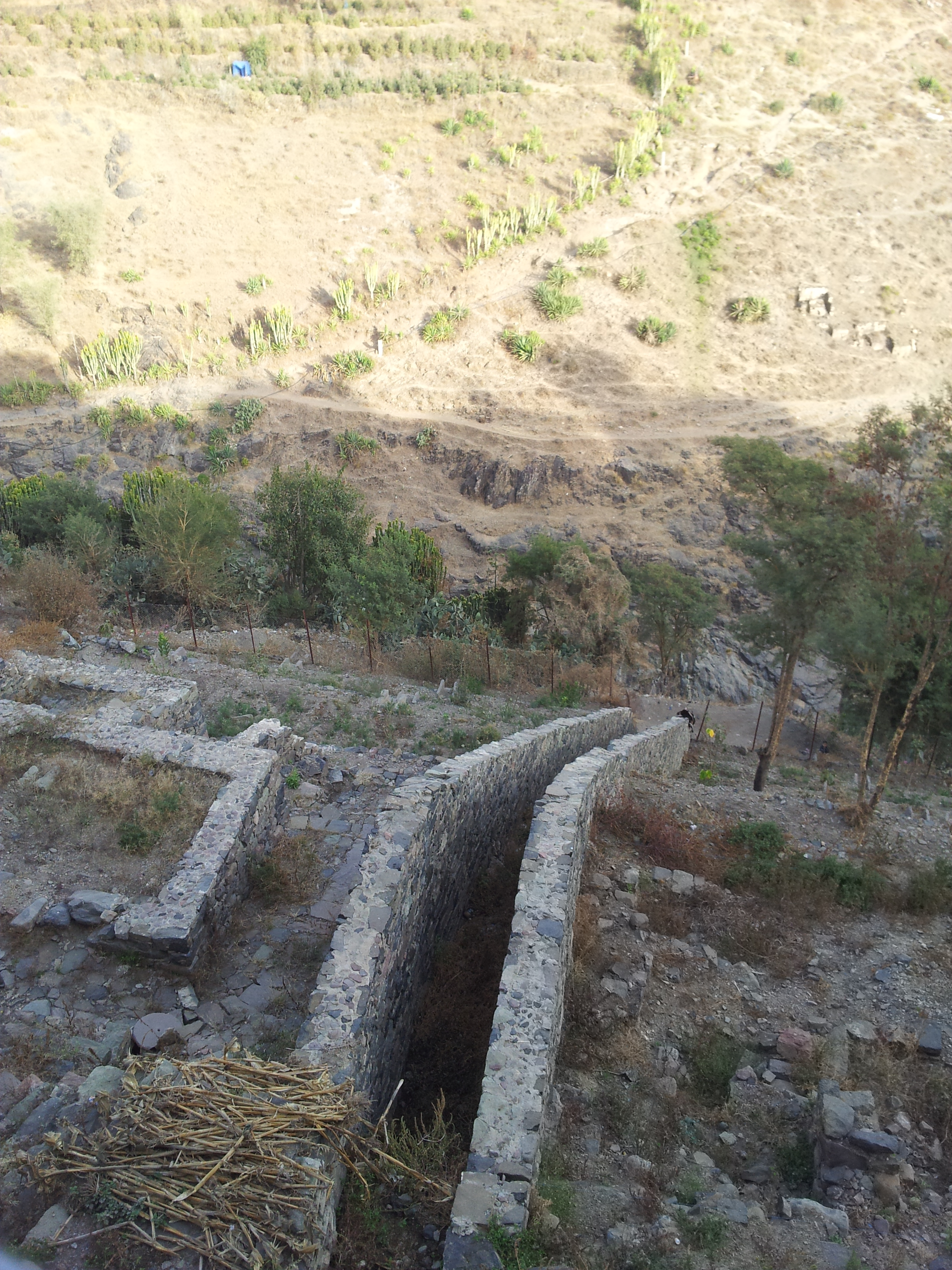
Drainage system of the palace

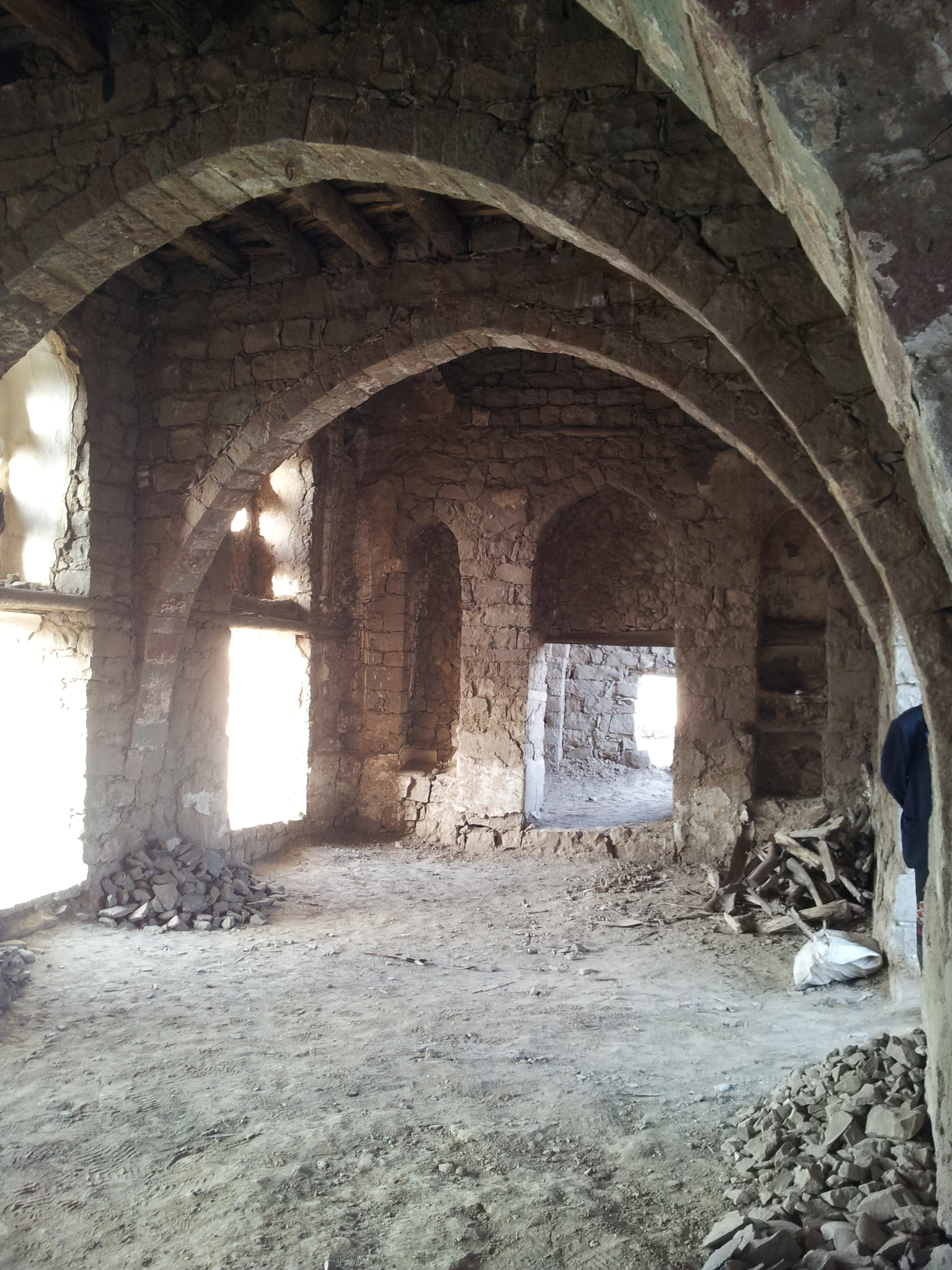
Court

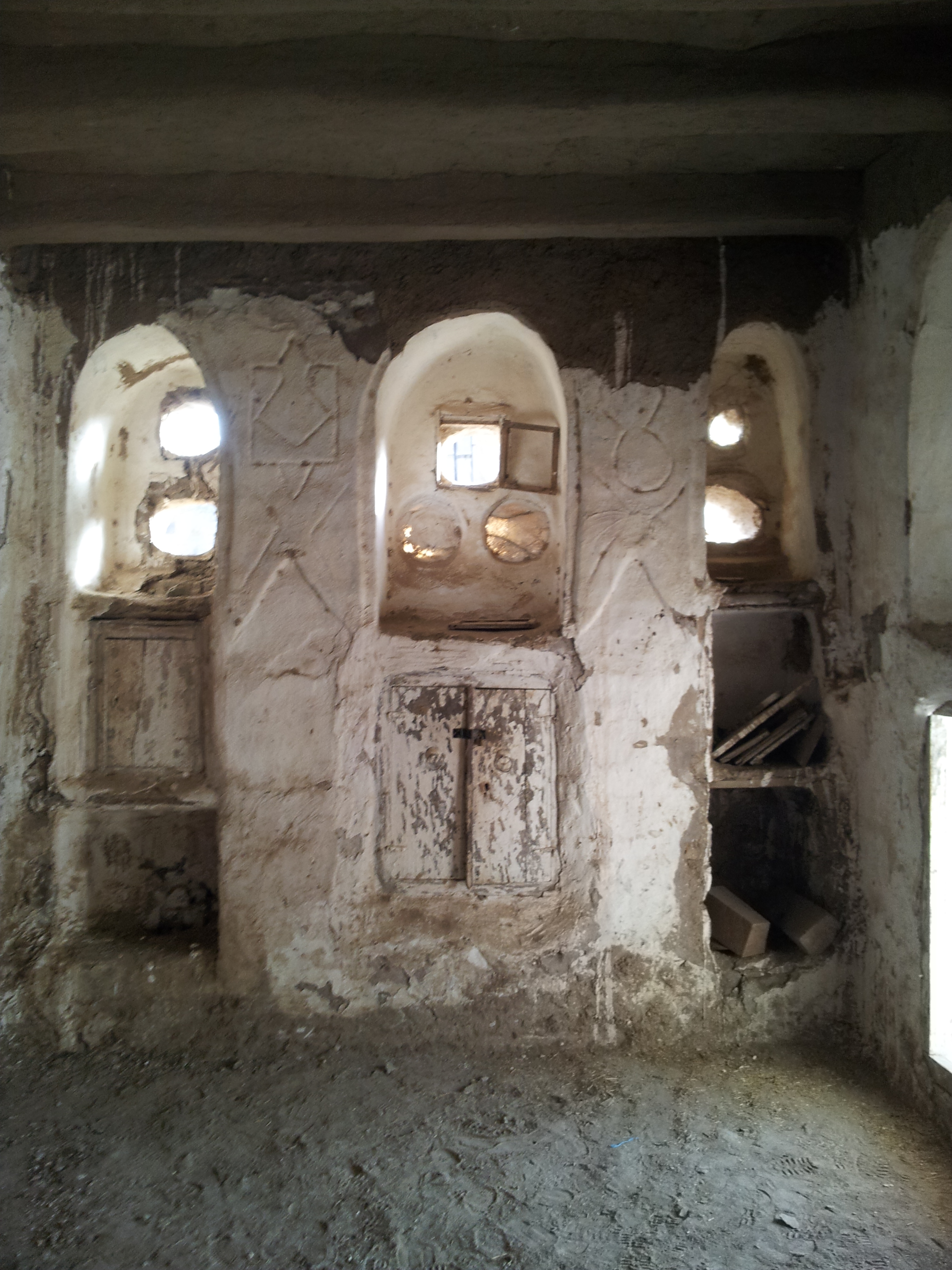
Window and shelves

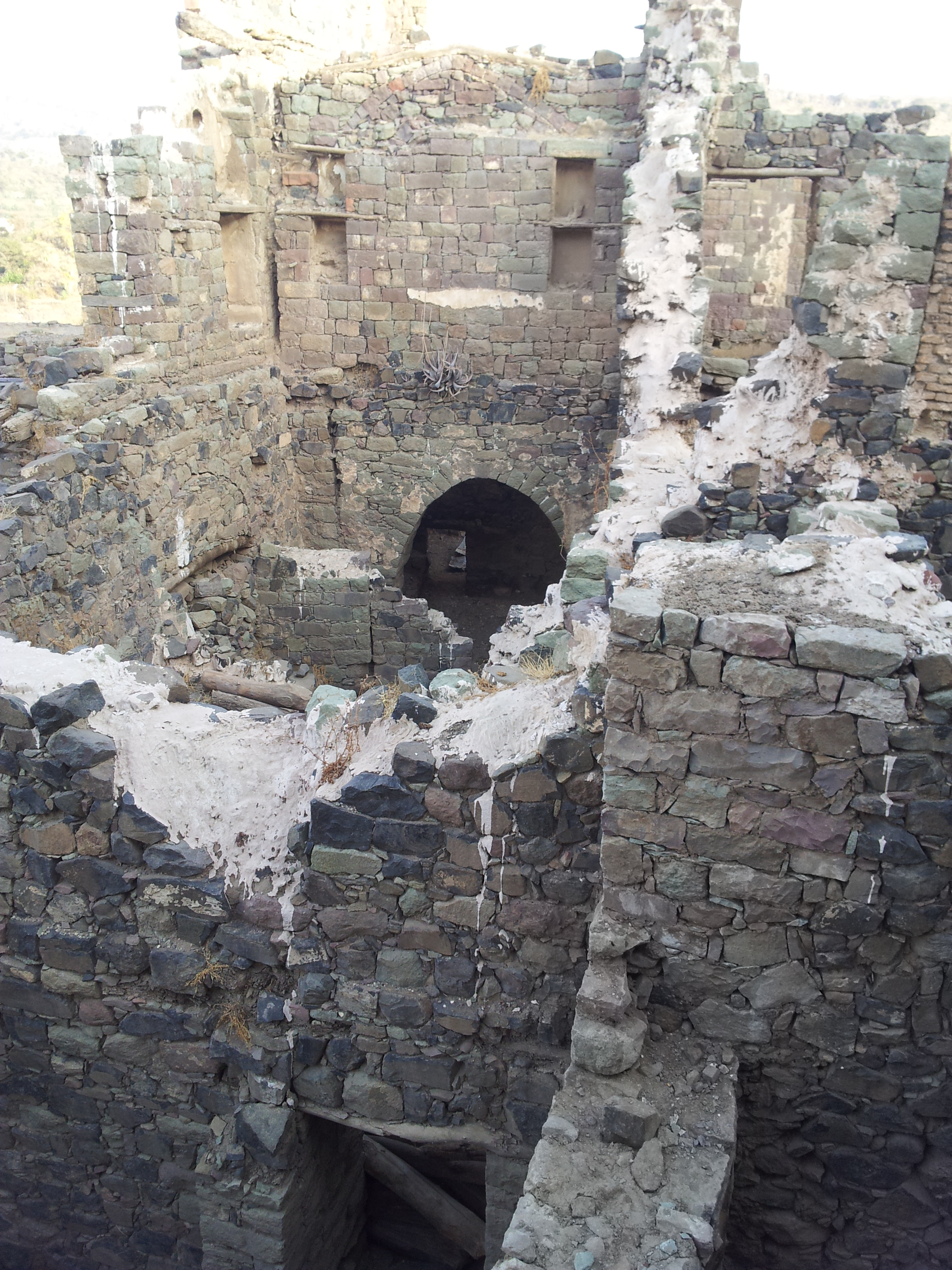
Ruins

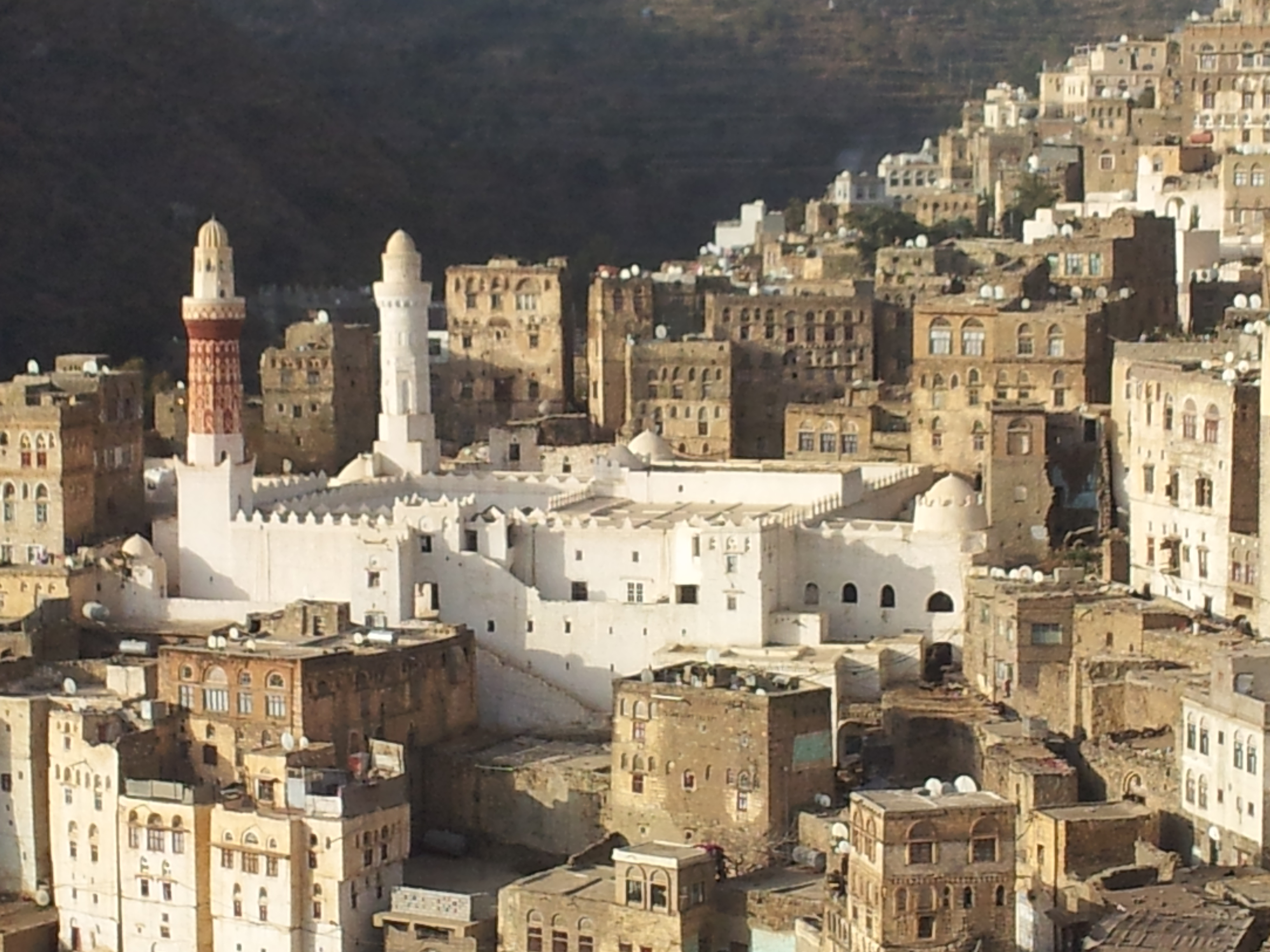
Queen Arwa's Mosque, as seen from the palace
