= Foumbot =

- Commune and town
- Location in Cameroon
- Coordinates: 5°30′N 10°38′E
- Country: Cameroon
- Region: West
- Elevation: 120 m (390 ft)

Population (2012)
  - Total: 57,367
- Time zone: UTC+1 (WAT)

Foumbot is a town and commune in Cameroon.

== Buildings ==
In 2022, American YouTuber MrBeast built a well in the town.

== Notable people ==
- Abdoul Njankou (born 1984), footballer

== See also ==
- Communes of Cameroon
