= Samir Abdel Fattah =

Yemeni writer and playwright

- Born: 1971 (age 54–55); Jibla, Yemen
- Education: Economics and business
- Occupations: Short story writer, novelist, playwright
- Writing career
- Language: Arabic
- Genres: Short stories, novels, plays
- Notable works: Ranin al-matar Riwayat al-Sayyid Mim; Ibn al-nasr

Samir Abdel Fattah is a Yemeni short story writer, novelist and playwright. He is regarded as part of the avant-garde in modern Yemeni literature and is particularly known for his interest in European literature, especially Russian literature.

== Early life and education ==
Abdel Fattah was born in Jibla, Yemen, in 1971. He moved to Sanaa in 1982, where he studied economics and business at university.

== Literary career ==
Abdel Fattah began his literary career as a short story writer. His first short story collection, Ranin al-matar, was published in 2002. He subsequently published two further collections.

He has also written two novels: Riwayat al-Sayyid Mim, published in 2007, and Ibn al-nasr, published in 2008. In addition to fiction, he has written plays for the theatre.

== Literary style and themes ==
Abdel Fattah is a versatile writer whose work frequently explores existential themes. He has a particular interest in European literature, with Russian literature being a notable influence on his writing. His work has been described as part of the avant-garde of modern Yemeni literature.

In 2009, Abdel Fattah joined fellow Yemeni writers Nadia al-Kokabany, Wajdi al-Ahdal and Ali al-Moqri in establishing a literary group called Meeting Yesterday.

== Translations and international recognition ==
Abdel Fattah's work has been translated into Italian. His writing was included in Perle Dello Yemen, a 2009 anthology of contemporary Yemeni writers.
