= Abdoul Njankou =

Cameroonian footballer

Abdoul Njankouo
Personal information
- Full name: Abdoul Fatah Njankouo Nsangou
- Date of birth: 27 May 1984 (age 42)
- Place of birth: Foumbot, Cameroon
- Height: 1.87 m (6 ft 2 in)
- Position: Centre-back

Senior career*
Years	Team	Apps	(Gls)
2001–2004	Sable FC		
2005	Plaza Colonia		
2006	Central Español		
2007	Nacional		
2009	Indios		
2010–2011	Bella Vista		
- * Club domestic league appearances and goals

Abdoul Fatah Njankouo Nsangou (born 27 May 1984), also known as Mustafá, is a Cameroonian former professional footballer who played as a centre-back.

== Career ==
Born in Foumbot, Njankouo plays as a defensive midfielder and central defender. He played for Plaza Colonia, Central Español and Nacional in the Primera División Uruguaya.

Njankouo joined Indios de Ciudad Juárez before the start of the Primera División de México Clausura 2009 tournament, but was not registered for the season because a medical test revealed he had hypertension.

== Personal life ==
Njankouo is Muslim. He has a son called Ahmed Njankouo, born in Uruguay to an Uruguayan mother who was called up to the Uruguay national under-20 football team for the 2026 South American Games and played during the tournament.
