= Ahmed Salah Abdelfatah =

Dutch actor raised in France

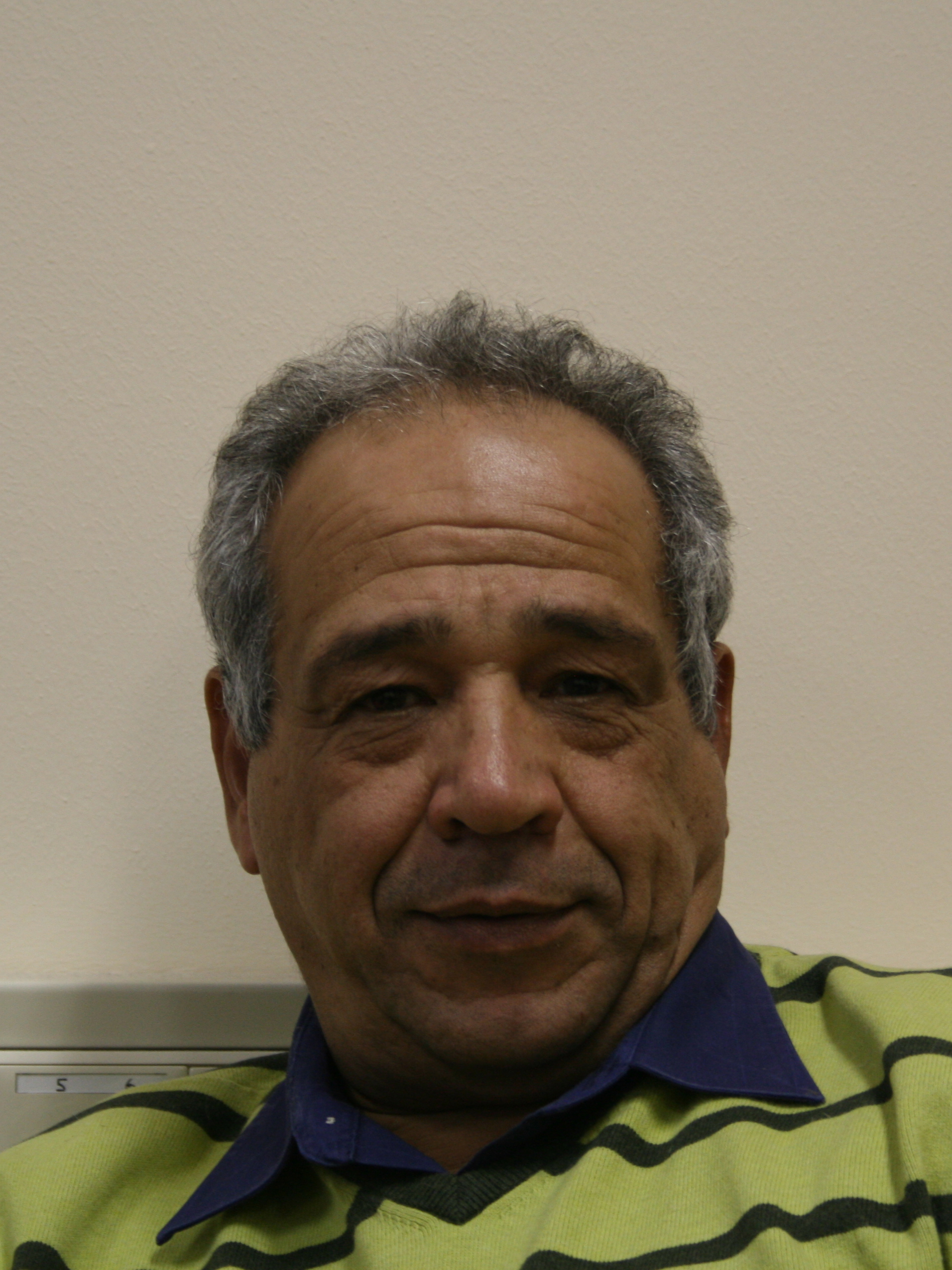
Abdelfatah Ahmed Salah, Amsterdam 2010

Ahmed Salah Abdelfatah (Arabic: أحمد صلاح عبد الفتاح; born in 1949) is a Dutch actor raised in France who has Moroccan-Yemenite roots. He is usually typecast to play an old Moroccan man, either an imam or a grandfather. He lives in Amsterdam, is married and has a daughter and a son. He has acted in the following productions:

== Career ==
Films

- Coach (2009, Joram Lürsen)
- Dunya & Desie (2008, Dana Nechustan)'
- Sextet (2007, Eddy Terstall)
- Color me bad (2007, Hesdy Lonwijk)
- Shouf Shouf Habibi! (2004, Albert ter Heerdt)
- Oesters van Nam Kee (2002, Pollo de Pimentel)
- Polleke (2003, Ineke Houtman),
- Najib en Julia (2003, Theo van Gogh)
- The Zone (2001)
- Do Not Disturb (1999, Dick Maas)

TV

- Onderweg naar Morgen,
- Goede tijden, slechte tijden,
- Shouf Shouf Habibi!, the series,
- Dunya and Desi, the series,
