= Abdoul Fatah (Malagasy politician) =

Malagasy politician

Abdoul Fatah is a Malagasy politician. A member of the National Assembly of Madagascar, he was elected as a member of the Tiako I Madagasikara party in the 2007 Malagasy parliamentary elections with 53% of the votes. He represents the first constituency of Antsiranana.
