= Samih Abdel Fattah Iskandar =

Samih Abdel Fattah Iskandar (Arabic: سميح عبد الفتاح إسكندر) served as International Commissioner of the Jordanian Association for Boy Scouts and Girl Guides, as well as the Chairman of the Arab Scout Committee.

In 1995, he was awarded the 240th Bronze Wolf, the only distinction of the World Organization of the Scout Movement, awarded by the World Scout Committee for exceptional services to world Scouting.
