= Jiblah (Ibb) =

Jiblah جبلة
- Sub-district
- Location in Yemen
- Coordinates: 13°55′12″N 44°08′18″E
- Country: Yemen
- Governorate: Ibb Governorate
- District: Jiblah District

Population (2004)
  - Total: 16,566
- Time zone: UTC+3

Jiblah (Arabic: جبلة) is a sub-district located in Jiblah District, Ibb Governorate, Yemen. Jiblah had a population of 16,566 according to the 2004 census.
