= Abd al-Fattah Fumani =

Iranian historian

- عبدالفتاح فومنی
- Born: 16th century Fuman, Gilan, Persia
- Died: 17th century
- Occupation: Historian

Academic work
- Era: Safavid era
- Discipline: History
- Notable works: Tarikh-i Gilan

Abd al-Fattah Fumani (Persian: عبدالفتاح فومنی) was a 17th century Persian historian from Fuman in Gilan, who wrote a history of his native province, the Tarikh-i Gilan.

== Sources ==
- Ghereghlou, Kioumars (2008). "Fūmanī, ʿAbd al-Fattāḥ". In Fleet, Kate; Krämer, Gudrun; Matringe, Denis; Nawas, John; Rowson, Everett (eds.). Encyclopaedia of Islam (3rd ed.). Brill Online. doi:10.1163/1573-3912_ei3_COM_24645. ISSN 1873-9830.
- Quinn, Sholeh (2000). "ʿAbd-al-Fattāḥ Fūmanī". FŪMANĪ, ʿABD-AL-FATTĀḤ – Encyclopaedia Iranica. Encyclopaedia Iranica, Vol. X, Fasc. 3. pp. 228–229.
