= Jibla, Yemen =

Jiblaa جِبْلَة
- Town
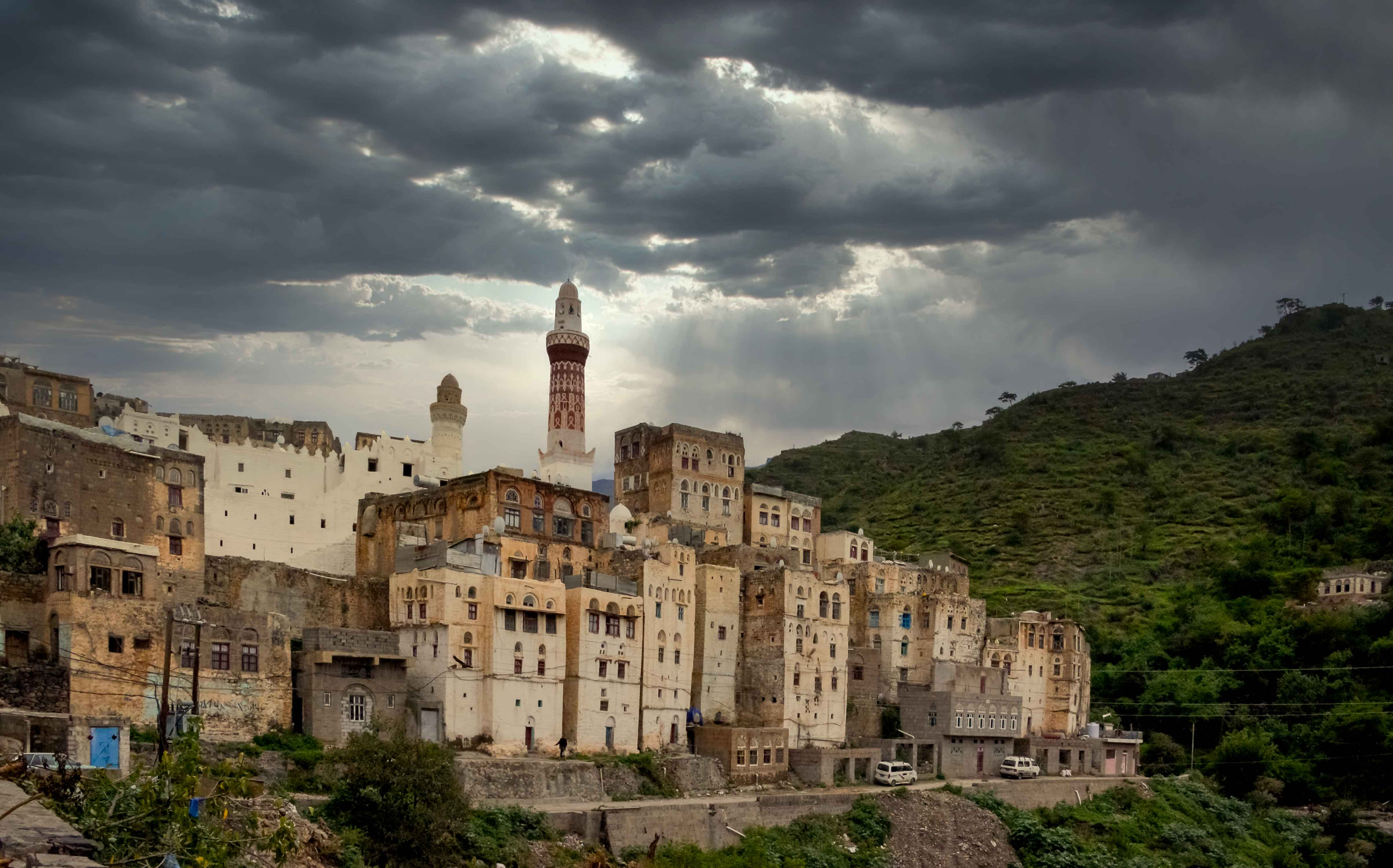
- Jibla, with the Queen Arwa Mosque in the background

- Location in Yemen Jiblaa (Middle East) Jiblaa (West and Central Asia)
- Coordinates: 13°55′N 44°9′E
- Country: Yemen
- Governorate: Ibb Governorate
- District: Jibla
- Time zone: UTC+3 (Yemen Standard Time)

Jiblah (Arabic: جِبْلَة) is a town in the Ibb Governorate of Yemen, south-west of the city of Ibb. It is located at the elevation of around 2,200 metres (7,200 feet), near Jabal At-Ta'kar (جَبَل ٱلتَّعْكَر). The town and its surroundings were added to the UNESCO World Heritage Tentative List due to its purported universal cultural value. By 2019 Jiblah University for Medical and Health Sciences was established in the center of the town of Jiblah. The historical Palace of Queen Arwa is located in the town.

== History ==
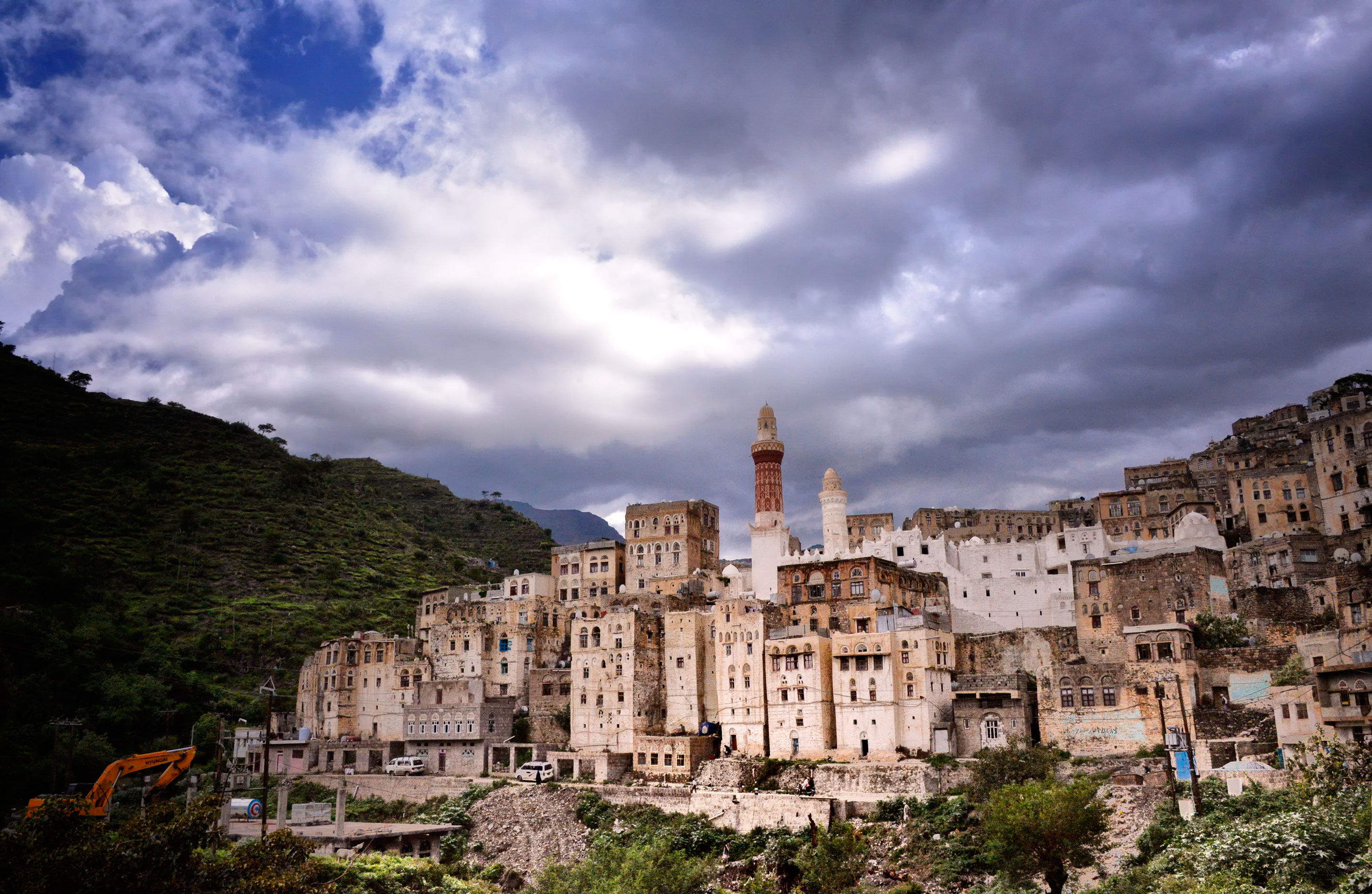
The town of Jibla

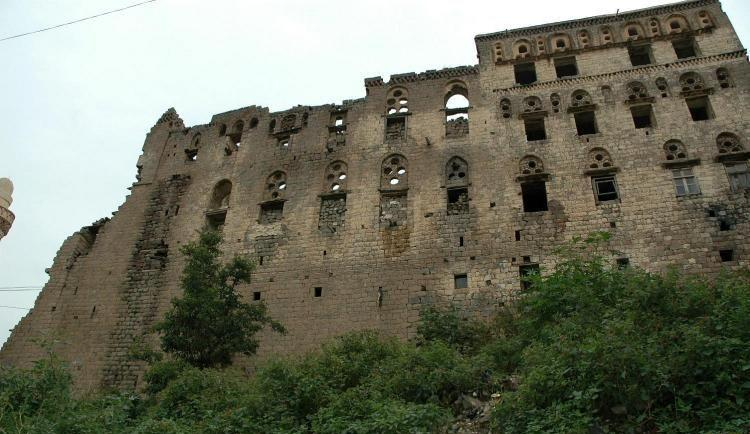
The palace of Queen Arwa in 2013

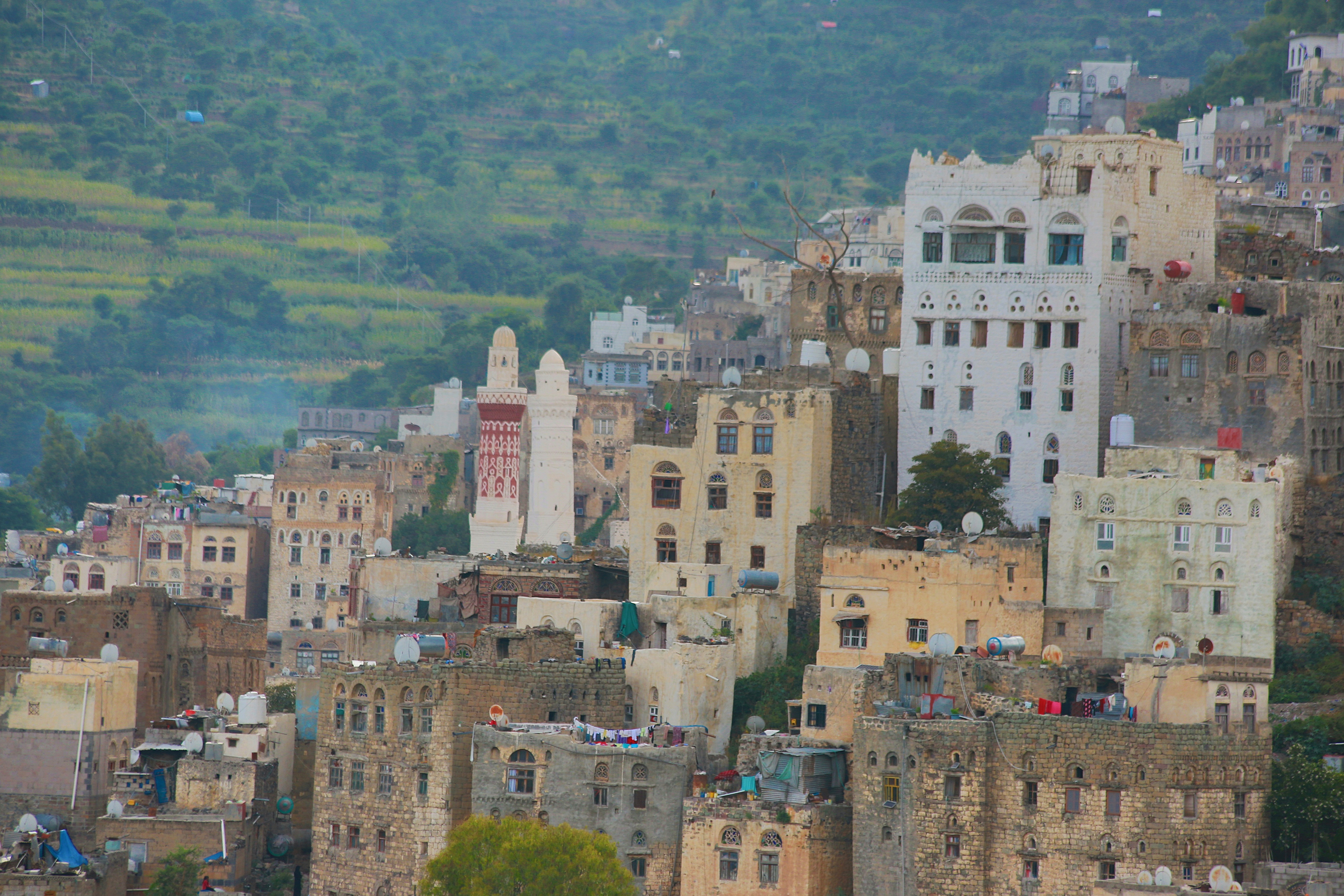
Jibla (Yemen)

Following the assassination of the Sulayhid 'Ali ibn Muhammad in 1067 CE, Arwa al-Sulayhi's husband Ahmad became the de jure ruler of Yemen, but he was unable to rule, being paralysed and bedridden. He gave all of his power to Arwa, one of her first actions was to move the capital from Sana'a to Jibla, in order to be in a better position to destroy Sa'id ibn Najar, and thus avenge her father-in-law's death. This she managed to do by luring him into a trap in 1088. She built a new palace at Jibla, and transformed the old palace into a great mosque where she was eventually buried.

On December 30, 2002, an Islamist militant entered Jibla Baptist Hospital and shot and killed three Southern Baptist hospital workers. The day after the shootings, ownership of the hospital was transferred to the Yemeni government. The government assumed responsibility in 2003 and continued to employ Southern Baptist workers until its closing in May 2007.

== Rural life ==
As late as 1979, the women of Jibla would launder their clothes in large pools formed by rivulets of natural spring water, which trickled down the slopes of Jebal Attaker. Stepping stones of the brook were used in place of scrub-boards.

Rest your heart among the little hills of Dhī l-Sufāl, gaze upon its expanses, / There the air is as clear as crystal, the water is pure, and night brings even greater happiness.

== Infrastructure ==
=== Health ===
An American Baptist Hospital was located in Jibla. On December 30, 2002, an Islamist militant entered the hospital, and shot and killed three Southern Baptist hospital workers. The day after the shootings, ownership of the hospital was transferred to the Yemeni government. The government assumed responsibility in 2003, and continued to employ Southern Baptist workers, until its closing in May 2007.

As with other areas in war-torn Yemen, Jibla was affected by the COVID-19 pandemic, but its hospital lacked capabilities to test for the coronavirus, thus doctors there had to use other means to diagnose it. Yet according to two healthcare workers there, the hospital daily received almost 50 people with symptoms, and out of fear of reprisals, doctors did not inform relatives of deceased patients about them even being suspected to have contracted the virus.

=== Mosques ===
There are two historical mosques here:

- Queen Arwa Mosque
- Qubbat az-Zum Mosque
