= List of German football transfers winter 2011–12 =

This is a list of German football transfers in the winter transfer window 2011–12 by club. Only transfers of the Bundesliga, and 2. Bundesliga are included.

== Bundesliga ==
=== Borussia Dortmund ===
In:

Out:

Note: Flags indicate national team as has been defined under FIFA eligibility rules. Players may hold more than one non-FIFA nationality.

No.	Pos.	Nation	Player

No.	Pos.	Nation	Player
10	FW	EGY	Mohamed Zidan (to 1. FSV Mainz 05)
28	DF	GER	Marc Hornschuh (on loan to FC Ingolstadt 04)

=== Bayer 04 Leverkusen ===
In:

No.	Pos.	Nation	Player
23	GK	GER	Bernd Leno (from VfB Stuttgart, previously on loan)
--	FW	GER	Tobias Steffen (loan return from Energie Cottbus)
--	DF	CRO	Vedran Ćorluka (on loan from Tottenham Hotspur)

Out:

No.	Pos.	Nation	Player
14	MF	GER	Hanno Balitsch (to 1. FC Nürnberg)
31	FW	DEN	Nicolai Jørgensen (on loan to 1. FC Kaiserslautern)

=== FC Bayern Munich ===
In:

No.	Pos.	Nation	Player

Out:

No.	Pos.	Nation	Player

=== Hannover 96 ===
In:

No.	Pos.	Nation	Player
18	FW	SEN	Mame Biram Diouf (from Manchester United)

Out:

No.	Pos.	Nation	Player

=== 1. FSV Mainz 05 ===
In:

No.	Pos.	Nation	Player
16	DF	GER	Stefan Bell (loan return from Eintracht Frankfurt)
21	GK	GER	Loris Karius (from Manchester City, previously on loan)
35	FW	EGY	Mohamed Zidan (from Borussia Dortmund)

Out:

No.	Pos.	Nation	Player
16	MF	GER	Florian Heller (to FC Ingolstadt 04)

=== 1. FC Nürnberg ===
In:

No.	Pos.	Nation	Player
4	DF	USA	Omar Gonzalez (on loan from Los Angeles Galaxy)
5	MF	GER	Hanno Balitsch (from Bayer 04 Leverkusen)
23	FW	CZE	Adam Hloušek (from Baumit Jablonec, previously on loan at Slavia Prague)

Out:

No.	Pos.	Nation	Player

=== 1. FC Kaiserslautern ===
In:

No.	Pos.	Nation	Player
5	MF	POL	Ariel Borysiuk (from Legia Warsaw)
11	FW	GER	Sandro Wagner (on loan from Werder Bremen)
22	FW	DEN	Nicolai Jørgensen (on loan from Bayer Leverkusen)
25	DF	ALG	Anthar Yahia (from Al Nassr FC)
31	FW	POL	Jakub Świerczok (from Polonia Bytom)

Out:

No.	Pos.	Nation	Player
5	DF	GER	Martin Amedick (to Eintracht Frankfurt)
11	FW	BUL	Iliyan Mitsanski (on loan to FSV Frankfurt)
14	MF	ISR	Gil Vermouth (on loan to De Graafschap)
15	MF	AUT	Clemens Walch (on loan to Dynamo Dresden)
18	FW	ALG	Chadli Amri (on loan to FSV Frankfurt)
19	MF	CZE	Jiří Bílek (to Zagłębie Lubin)
25	MF	CRO	Stiven Rivić (released)
32	FW	SVK	Adam Nemec (to FC Ingolstadt 04)

=== Hamburger SV ===
In:

No.	Pos.	Nation	Player

Out:

No.	Pos.	Nation	Player
19	DF	GER	Lennard Sowah (on loan to Millwall F.C.)

=== SC Freiburg ===
In:

No.	Pos.	Nation	Player
9	FW	CRO	Ivan Santini (on loan from NK Zadar)
13	DF	SEN	Diagné Fallou (from FC Metz)
16	DF	DEN	Michael Lumb (on loan from Zenit St. Petersburg, previously on loan at AaB)
31	MF	SVK	Karim Guédé (from Slovan Bratislava)
35	FW	GER	Sebastian Freis (from 1. FC Köln)

Out:

No.	Pos.	Nation	Player
3	DF	GER	Felix Bastians (to Hertha BSC)
5	DF	GER	Heiko Butscher (to Eintracht Frankfurt)
6	MF	MAR	Yacine Abdessadki (released)
9	FW	SEN	Papiss Cissé (to Newcastle United)
10	MF	ROU	Maximilian Nicu (to TSV 1860 München)

=== 1. FC Köln ===
In:

No.	Pos.	Nation	Player
9	FW	PRK	Jong Tae-Se (from VfL Bochum)
16	FW	SWE	Mikael Ishak (from Assyriska Föreningen)

Out:

No.	Pos.	Nation	Player
7	FW	GER	Sebastian Freis (to SC Freiburg)
14	FW	ROU	Alexandru Ioniţă (on loan to Rapid București)
18	DF	JPN	Tomoaki Makino (on loan to Urawa Red Diamonds)
25	MF	POL	Adam Matuschyk (on loan to Fortuna Düsseldorf)
38	FW	GER	Thiemo-Jérôme Kialka (to SSV Jahn Regensburg)

=== TSG 1899 Hoffenheim ===
In:

No.	Pos.	Nation	Player
4	DF	GER	Stefan Thesker (from FC Twente)
27	MF	LIE	Sandro Wieser (from FC Basel)
39	FW	CRO	Srđan Lakić (on loan from VfL Wolfsburg)
--	FW	BRA	Wellington (loan return from Goiás)

Out:

No.	Pos.	Nation	Player
11	MF	ISL	Gylfi Sigurðsson (on loan to Swansea City)
19	FW	BIH	Vedad Ibišević (to VfB Stuttgart)
20	FW	NGA	Chinedu Obasi (on loan to FC Schalke 04)

=== VfB Stuttgart ===
In:

No.	Pos.	Nation	Player
2	DF	JPN	Gotoku Sakai (on loan from Albirex Niigata)
9	FW	BIH	Vedad Ibišević (from 1899 Hoffenheim)

Out:

No.	Pos.	Nation	Player
29	FW	RUS	Pavel Pogrebnyak (to Fulham F.C.)
38	DF	BIH	Ermin Bičakčić (to Eintracht Braunschweig)
--	GK	GER	Bernd Leno (to Bayer 04 Leverkusen, previously on loan)

=== Werder Bremen ===
In:

No.	Pos.	Nation	Player
3	DF	SUI	François Affolter (from BSC Young Boys)
23	FW	AUT	Zlatko Junuzović (from Austria Wien)

Out:

No.	Pos.	Nation	Player
19	FW	GER	Sandro Wagner (on loan to 1. FC Kaiserslautern)
23	DF	GER	Andreas Wolf (to AS Monaco)

=== FC Schalke 04 ===
In:

No.	Pos.	Nation	Player
19	FW	NGA	Chinedu Obasi (on loan from 1899 Hoffenheim)

Out:

No.	Pos.	Nation	Player
16	MF	CZE	Jan Moravek (on loan to FC Augsburg)

=== VfL Wolfsburg ===
In:

No.	Pos.	Nation	Player
3	DF	SUI	Ricardo Rodríguez (from FC Zürich)
6	MF	SRB	Slobodan Medojević (from Vojvodina)
8	FW	CIV	Ibrahim Sissoko (from Académica Coimbra)
14	FW	POR	Vieirinha (from PAOK)
20	MF	CZE	Petr Jiráček (from Viktoria Plzeň)
43	FW	MKD	Ferhan Hasani (from Shkëndija)
44	FW	FRA	Giovanni Sio (from FC Sion)
45	DF	BRA	Felipe Aliste Lopes (from C.D. Nacional)

Out:

No.	Pos.	Nation	Player
5	MF	KOR	Koo Ja-Cheol (on loan to FC Augsburg)
6	MF	BLR	Aleksandr Hleb (loan return to FC Barcelona)
8	MF	DEN	Thomas Kahlenberg (on loan to Evian F.C.)
9	FW	CRO	Srđan Lakić (on loan to TSG 1899 Hoffenheim)
14	MF	GER	Tolga Ciğerci (on loan to Borussia Mönchengladbach)
16	DF	GRE	Sotirios Kyrgiakos (on loan to Sunderland)

=== Borussia Mönchengladbach ===
In:

No.	Pos.	Nation	Player
5	MF	FIN	Alexander Ring (on loan from HJK Helsinki)
6	MF	GER	Tolga Ciğerci (on loan from VfL Wolfsburg)

Out:

No.	Pos.	Nation	Player
8	MF	GER	Lukas Rupp (on loan to SC Paderborn 07)
15	FW	NOR	Joshua King (loan return to Manchester United)
28	FW	GER	Elias Kachunga (on loan to VfL Osnabrück)

=== Hertha BSC ===
In:

No.	Pos.	Nation	Player
22	DF	GER	Felix Bastians (from SC Freiburg)

Out:

No.	Pos.	Nation	Player

=== FC Augsburg ===
In:

No.	Pos.	Nation	Player
5	MF	CZE	Jan Moravek (on loan from Schalke 04)
14	MF	KOR	Koo Ja-Cheol (on loan from VfL Wolfsburg)
--	DF	GER	Matthias Ostrzolek (from VfL Bochum)

Out:

No.	Pos.	Nation	Player
5	DF	GER	Uwe Möhrle (to Energie Cottbus)
19	FW	GER	Patrick Mayer (on loan to 1. FC Heidenheim)
27	FW	GER	Michael Thurk (to 1. FC Heidenheim)

== 2. Bundesliga ==
=== Eintracht Frankfurt ===
In:

No.	Pos.	Nation	Player
5	DF	GER	Martin Amedick (from 1. FC Kaiserslautern)
--	MF	GHA	Mohammed Abu (on loan from Manchester City, previously on loan at Strømsgodset)
--	DF	GER	Heiko Butscher (from SC Freiburg)

Out:

No.	Pos.	Nation	Player
5	DF	GER	Stefan Bell (loan return to 1. FSV Mainz 05)
9	FW	GRE	Theofanis Gekas (to Samsunspor)
31	DF	GRE	Georgios Tzavelas (to AS Monaco)

=== FC St. Pauli ===
In:

No.	Pos.	Nation	Player
--	GK	GER	Philipp Heerwagen (on loan from VfL Bochum)

Out:

No.	Pos.	Nation	Player
7	FW	GER	Rouwen Hennings (on loan to VfL Osnabrück)
11	DF	GER	Ralph Gunesch (to FC Ingolstadt 04)

=== VfL Bochum ===
In:

No.	Pos.	Nation	Player
9	FW	GEO	Nikoloz Gelashvili (from FC Zestaponi)
25	MF	GER	Michael Delura (free agent)
29	GK	GER	Markus Scholz (from VfL Bochum II)

Out:

No.	Pos.	Nation	Player
8	MF	SWE	Andreas Johansson (to IFK Norrköping)
9	FW	PRK	Jong Tae-Se (to 1. FC Köln)
19	DF	GER	Matthias Ostrzolek (to FC Augsburg)
29	GK	GER	Philipp Heerwagen (on loan to FC St. Pauli)

=== SpVgg Greuther Fürth ===
In:

No.	Pos.	Nation	Player
11	FW	GER	Gerald Asamoah (free agent)

Out:

No.	Pos.	Nation	Player

=== FC Erzgebirge Aue ===
In:

No.	Pos.	Nation	Player
11	FW	GER	Halil Savran (from 1. FC Union Berlin)

Out:

No.	Pos.	Nation	Player
11	MF	GER	Robert Strauß (to 1. FC Heidenheim)
28	FW	ALB	Alban Ramaj (to FC Carl Zeiss Jena)

=== Energie Cottbus ===
In:

No.	Pos.	Nation	Player
14	FW	ROU	Marius Bilașco (from Tianjin Teda)
35	DF	GER	Uwe Möhrle (from FC Augsburg)

Out:

No.	Pos.	Nation	Player
4	DF	CAN	Adam Straith (on loan to 1. FC Saarbrücken)
6	FW	NGA	Charles Nwaogu (released)
7	FW	BRA	Adi (released)
9	FW	GER	Mustafa Kučuković (released)
16	MF	GER	Marco Kurth (to 1. FC Magdeburg)
19	FW	GER	Tobias Steffen (loan return to Bayer Leverkusen)
--	FW	SRB	Velimir Jovanović (on loan to 1. FC Magdeburg, previously on loan at FC Carl Zeiss Jena)

=== Fortuna Düsseldorf ===
In:

No.	Pos.	Nation	Player
28	FW	FIN	Timo Furuholm (from Inter Turku)
--	MF	POL	Adam Matuszczyk (on loan from 1. FC Köln)

Out:

No.	Pos.	Nation	Player
4	DF	TUN	Karim Aouadhi (released)
15	FW	GER	Marco Königs (released)
20	FW	GER	Adriano Grimaldi (on loan to SV Sandhausen)

=== MSV Duisburg ===
In:

No.	Pos.	Nation	Player
33	FW	POL	Tomasz Zahorski (from Górnik Zabrze)
24	MF	BIH	Dušan Jevtić (from TSV 1860 München II)

Out:

No.	Pos.	Nation	Player

=== TSV 1860 Munich ===
In:

No.	Pos.	Nation	Player
8	MF	ROU	Maximilian Nicu (from SC Freiburg)
--	DF	ESP	Guillermo Vallori (from Grasshopper Club Zürich)

Out:

No.	Pos.	Nation	Player
5	DF	GER	Dennis Malura (to 1. FC Heidenheim)
18	FW	GER	Manuel Schäffler (to FC Ingolstadt 04)

=== Alemannia Aachen ===
In:

No.	Pos.	Nation	Player
13	MF	GER	Albert Streit (from Schalke 04 II)

Out:

No.	Pos.	Nation	Player
11	FW	GER	Fabian Bäcker (on loan to Borussia Mönchengladbach II)
22	MF	GER	Lennart Hartmann (to SV Babelsberg 03)

=== 1. FC Union Berlin ===
In:

No.	Pos.	Nation	Player

Out:

No.	Pos.	Nation	Player
21	FW	GER	Halil Savran (to FC Erzgebirge Aue)

=== SC Paderborn 07 ===
In:

No.	Pos.	Nation	Player
--	MF	GER	Diego Demme (from Arminia Bielefeld)
--	MF	GER	Lukas Rupp (on loan from Borussia Mönchengladbach)

Out:

No.	Pos.	Nation	Player
16	MF	GER	Nico Klotz (to SV Sandhausen)
33	FW	GER	David Jansen (to Rot-Weiß Oberhausen)

=== FSV Frankfurt ===
In:

No.	Pos.	Nation	Player
--	FW	ALG	Chadli Amri (on loan from 1. FC Kaiserslautern)
--	FW	BUL	Iliyan Mitsanski (on loan from 1. FC Kaiserslautern)
--	MF	GER	Michael Görlitz (from Halmstads BK)
--	DF	PHI	Dennis Cagara (from Lyngby Boldklub)

Out:

No.	Pos.	Nation	Player
8	MF	BLR	Vyacheslav Hleb (released)
18	DF	SWE	Andreas Dahlén (released)

=== FC Ingolstadt 04 ===
In:

No.	Pos.	Nation	Player
24	DF	GER	Marc Hornschuh (on loan from Borussia Dortmund)
30	MF	GER	Florian Heller (from 1. FSV Mainz 05)
--	FW	GER	Manuel Schäffler (from 1860 Munich)
--	FW	SVK	Adam Nemec (from 1. FC Kaiserslautern)
--	DF	GER	Ralph Gunesch (from FC St. Pauli)

Out:

No.	Pos.	Nation	Player
23	FW	USA	Edson Buddle (released)
--	MF	FRA	Romain Dedola (to 1. FC Heidenheim)

=== Karlsruher SC ===
In:

No.	Pos.	Nation	Player
33	MF	SEN	Makhtar Thioune (on loan from Molde FK)
34	DF	ROU	Ionuț Rada (on loan from CFR Cluj)
35	DF	MLI	Bakary Soumaré (from US Boulogne)
--	GK	GER	Alexander Stolz (from VfB Stuttgart II)
--	DF	CYP	Elias Charalambous (from Alki Larnaca F.C.)
--	MF	GUI	Boubacar Fofana (on loan from Gondomar SC, previously on loan at Kartal S.K.)

Out:

No.	Pos.	Nation	Player
4	DF	AUT	Niklas Hoheneder (to RB Leipzig)
14	FW	GER	Anton Fink (to Chemnitzer FC)
22	MF	GER	Marco Engelhardt (to FC Rot-Weiß Erfurt)

=== Eintracht Braunschweig ===
In:

No.	Pos.	Nation	Player
--	FW	CAN	Randy Edwini-Bonsu (from AC Oulu)
--	DF	BIH	Ermin Bičakčić (from VfB Stuttgart)

Out:

No.	Pos.	Nation	Player

=== Hansa Rostock ===
In:

No.	Pos.	Nation	Player
--	FW	SWE	Freddy Borg (free agent)
--	DF	SVK	Marek Janečka (on loan from Zlaté Moravce)

Out:

No.	Pos.	Nation	Player

=== Dynamo Dresden ===
In:

No.	Pos.	Nation	Player
2	DF	SRB	Vujadin Savić (on loan from Girondins de Bordeaux)
18	MF	AUT	Clemens Walch (on loan from 1. FC Kaiserslautern)

Out:

No.	Pos.	Nation	Player
18	FW	BRA	Cidimar (to VfR Aalen)

== See also ==
- 2011–12 Bundesliga
- 2011–12 2. Bundesliga
