= 2010–11 1. FC Kaiserslautern season =

1. FC Kaiserslautern
2010–11 season
- Chairman: Stefan Kuntz
- Manager: Marco Kurz
- Bundesliga: 7th
- DFB Pokal: Eliminated in quarterfinals
- Top goalscorer: League: Srđan Lakić (16 goals); All: Srđan Lakić (23 goals)
Home colours	Away colours	Third colours

The 2010–11 season of 1. FC Kaiserslautern began on 13 August 2010 with a DFB-Pokal Match against VfL Osnabrück, and ended on 14 May 2011, the last matchday of the Bundesliga, with a match against Werder Bremen. Kaiserslautern were eliminated in the quarterfinals of the DFB Pokal, and finished 7th in the Bundesliga.

== Transfers ==
=== Summer transfers ===
In:

No.	Pos.	Nation	Player
2	DF	CZE	Jan Šimůnek (from VfL Wolfsburg)
3	DF	DEN	Leon Jessen (from FC Midtjylland)
7	MF	GER	Oliver Kirch (from Arminia Bielefeld)
8	MF	GER	Christian Tiffert (from MSV Duisburg)
10	FW	ALG	Chadli Amri (from 1. FSV Mainz 05)
11	FW	BUL	Iliyan Mitsanski (from Zaglebie Lubin)
13	DF	GRE	Athanasios Petsos (on loan from Bayer Leverkusen)
16	MF	CZE	Jan Morávek (on loan from FC Schalke 04)
20	DF	BRA	Rodnei (from Hertha BSC, previously on loan)
22	MF	CRO	Ivo Iličević (from VfL Bochum, previously on loan)
24	MF	AUT	Clemens Walch (from VfB Stuttgart)
38	MF	POL	Alan Stulin (from 1. FC Kaiserslautern II)
25	MF	CRO	Stiven Rivić (from FC Energie Cottbus)
33	FW	AUT	Erwin Hoffer (on loan form SSC Napoli)
--	MF	POR	Ricky Pinheiro (loan return from VfL Osnabrück)
--	MF	GER	Anel Džaka (loan return from TuS Koblenz)

Out:

No.	Pos.	Nation	Player
8	MF	GER	Sidney Sam (loan return to Hamburger SV)
13	DF	GER	Mario Klinger (to Rot-Weiß Oberhausen)
14	DF	GER	Manuel Hornig (to TuS Koblenz)
15	MF	CMR	Georges Mandjeck (loan return to VfB Stuttgart)
18	DF	GER	Christoph Buchner (to 1. FC Saarbrücken)
24	MF	BIH	Dragan Paljić (to Wisła Kraków)
25	DF	SUI	Daniel Pavlovic (loan return to FC Schaffhausen)
26	FW	SVK	Erik Jendrišek (to FC Schalke 04)
30	DF	GER	Fabian Müller (to FC Erzgebirge Aue)
31	FW	TUR	Alper Akcam (to Gaziantepspor)
33	MF	GER	Markus Steinhöfer (loan return to Eintracht Frankfurt)

=== Winter transfers ===
In:

No.	Pos.	Nation	Player
14	DF	BRA	Lucas (on loan from Bayer 04 Leverkusen)
24	FW	CZE	Adam Hloušek (on loan from Slavia Prague)

Out:

No.	Pos.	Nation	Player

== Goals and appearances ==
No.	Pos	Nat	Player	Total		Bundesliga		DFB-Pokal	
No.	Pos	Nat	Player	Apps	Goals	Apps	Goals	Apps	Goals
1	GK	(Germany) GER	Tobias Sippel	29	0	25	0	4	0
2	DF	(Czech Republic) CZE	Jan Šimůnek	1	0	0	0	1	0
3	DF	(Denmark) DEN	Leon Jessen	28	0	27	0	1	0
4	MF	(Germany) GER	Bastian Schulz	4	0	3	0	1	0
5	DF	(Germany) GER	Martin Amedick	30	2	26	2	4	0
6	DF	(Germany) GER	Mathias Abel	20	2	19	2	1	0
7	MF	(Germany) GER	Oliver Kirch	33	0	29	0	4	0
8	MF	(Germany) GER	Christian Tiffert	37	2	33	2	4	0
9	FW	(Croatia) CRO	Srđan Lakić	35	23	31	16	4	7
10	FW	(Algeria) ALG	Chadli Amri	8	0	6	0	2	0
11	FW	(Bulgaria) BUL	Iliyan Mitsanski	11	1	10	1	1	0
13	DF	(Greece) GRE	Athanasios Petsos	21	0	20	0	1	0
14	DF	(Brazil) BRA	Lucas	0	0	0	0	0	0
15	MF	(Austria) AUT	Clemens Walch	13	0	12	0	1	0
16	MF	(Czech Republic) CZE	Jan Morávek	32	5	29	5	3	0
17	DF	(Germany) GER	Alexander Bugera	16	0	12	0	4	0
18	MF	(Germany) GER	Danny Fuchs	1	0	1	0	0	0
19	MF	(Czech Republic) CZE	Jiří Bílek	16	0	15	0	1	0
20	DF	(Brazil) BRA	Rodnei	29	2	26	2	3	0
21	MF	(Germany) GER	Pierre de Wit	13	0	13	0	0	0
22	MF	(Croatia) CRO	Ivo Iličević	24	5	21	5	3	0
23	DF	(Germany) GER	Florian Dick	30	1	27	1	3	0
24	FW	(Czech Republic) CZE	Adam Hloušek	11	1	11	1	0	0
25	MF	(Croatia) CRO	Stiven Rivić	13	2	12	2	1	0
27	GK	(Austria) AUT	Marco Knaller	0	0	0	0	0	0
28	DF	(Portugal) POR	Marcel Correia	0	0	0	0	0	0
29	GK	(Germany) GER	Kevin Trapp	9	0	9	0	0	0
32	FW	(Slovakia) SVK	Adam Nemec	27	4	24	3	3	1
33	FW	(Austria) AUT	Erwin Hoffer	26	7	24	5	2	2
39	MF	(Poland) POL	Alan Stulin	0	0	0	0	0	0

Last Updated: 14 June 2011

== Competitions ==
=== Bundesliga ===
==== League table ====
Pos	Team	Pld	W	D	L	GF	GA	GD	Pts	Qualification or relegation
5	FSV Mainz 05	34	18	4	12	52	39	+13	58	Qualification to Europa League third qualifying round
6	1. FC Nürnberg	34	13	8	13	47	45	+2	47	
7	1. FC Kaiserslautern	34	13	7	14	48	51	−3	46	
8	Hamburger SV	34	12	9	13	46	52	−6	45	
9	SC Freiburg	34	13	5	16	41	50	−9	44	

Source: kicker
Rules for classification: 1) points; 2) goal difference; 3) number of goals scored.

==== Matches ====
Win Draw Loss

Note: Results are given with 1. FC Kaiserslautern score listed first.

Game	Date	Venue	Opponent	Result F–A	Attendance	1. FC Kaiserslautern Goalscorers
1	21 August 2010	A	1. FC Köln	3–1	49,200	Lakić 70', 84', Iličević 88'
2	27 August 2010	H	FC Bayern Munich	2–0	49,780	Lakić 36', Iličević 37'
3	12 September 2010	A	1. FSV Mainz 05	1–2	20,300	Lakić 20'
4	18 September 2010	H	1899 Hoffenheim	2–2	44,453	Hoffer 46', 75'
5	22 September 2010	A	Borussia Dortmund	0–5	70,100
6	26 September 2010	H	Hannover 96	0–1	40,115
7	2 October 2010	A	Hamburger SV	1–2	57,000	Lakić 3'
8	17 October 2010	H	Eintracht Frankfurt	0–3	49,780
9	23 October 2010	A	SC Freiburg	1–2	23,000	Morávek 8'
10	31 October 2010	H	Borussia Mönchengladbach	3–0	49,167	Tiffert 71', Nemec 83', Lakić 88'
11	7 November 2010	A	Bayer 04 Leverkusen	1–3	29,794	Dick 15'
12	13 November 2010	H	VfB Stuttgart	3–3	46,000	Mitsanski 58', Iličević 76', Abel 78'
13	20 November 2010	A	1. FC Nürnberg	3–1	40,711	Rivić 4', Iličević 12', Lakić 33'
14	27 November 2010	H	FC Schalke 04	5–0	49,474	Lakić 8', 56', Amedick 39', Iličević 76' (pen.), Morávek 88'
15	3 December 2010	A	FC St. Pauli	0–1	24,373
16	11 December 2010	H	VfL Wolfsburg	0–0	38,181
17	18 December 2010	A	Werder Bremen	2–1	36,000	Lakić 1', 52'
18	16 January 2011	H	1. FC Köln	1–1	42,259	Morávek 51'
19	22 January 2011	A	Bayern Munich	1–5	69,000	Morávek 62'
20	29 January 2011	H	1. FSV Mainz 05	0–1	46,649
21	5 February 2011	A	1899 Hoffenheim	2–3	30,150	Hoffer 58', Rodnei 59'
22	12 February 2011	H	Borussia Dortmund	1–1	49,750	Morávek 90'
23	19 February 2011	A	Hannover 96	0–3	35,412
24	25 February 2011	H	Hamburger SV	1–1	45,682	Hloušek 18'
25	5 March 2011	A	Eintracht Frankfurt	0–0	49,400
26	12 March 2011	H	SC Freiburg	2–1	41,015	Nemec 34', Hoffer 90+3'
27	18 March 2011	A	Borussia Mönchengladbach	1–0	47,696	Bailly 61' (o.g.)
28	2 April 2011	H	Bayer 04 Leverkusen	0–1	46,050
29	9 April 2011	A	VfB Stuttgart	4–2	39,500	Lakić 17', 79', Hoffer 68', Rivić 88'
30	16 April 2011	H	1. FC Nürnberg	0–2	49,780
31	23 April 2011	A	FC Schalke 04	1–0	61,673	Lakić 42'
32	29 April 2011	H	FC St. Pauli	2–0	49,780	Tiffert 29', Abel 68'
33	7 May 2011	A	VfL Wolfsburg	2–1	30,000	Lakić 25', Amedick 44'
34	14 May 2011	H	Werder Bremen	3–2	49,780	Nemec 7', Rodnei 9', Lakić 30'

=== DFB-Pokal ===
Win Draw Loss

Note: Results are given with 1. FC Kaiserslautern score listed first.

Game	Date	Venue	Opponent	Result F–A	Attendance	1. FC Kaiserslautern Goalscorers
1	13 August 2009	A	VfL Osnabrück	3–2 a.e.t.	15,500	Lakić 90', Hoffer 106', 111'
2	26 November 2010	H	Arminia Bielefeld	3–0	17,159	Lakić 11', 42', 48'
3	19 January 2011	A	TuS Koblenz	4–1	15,000	Lakić 54', 59', 65', Nemec 64'
QF	26 January 2011	A	MSV Duisburg	0–2	21,917

== See also ==
- 2010–11 Bundesliga
- 2010–11 DFB-Pokal
- 1. FC Kaiserslautern
