= 2011–12 Bundesliga =

49th season of the Bundesliga

Bundesliga
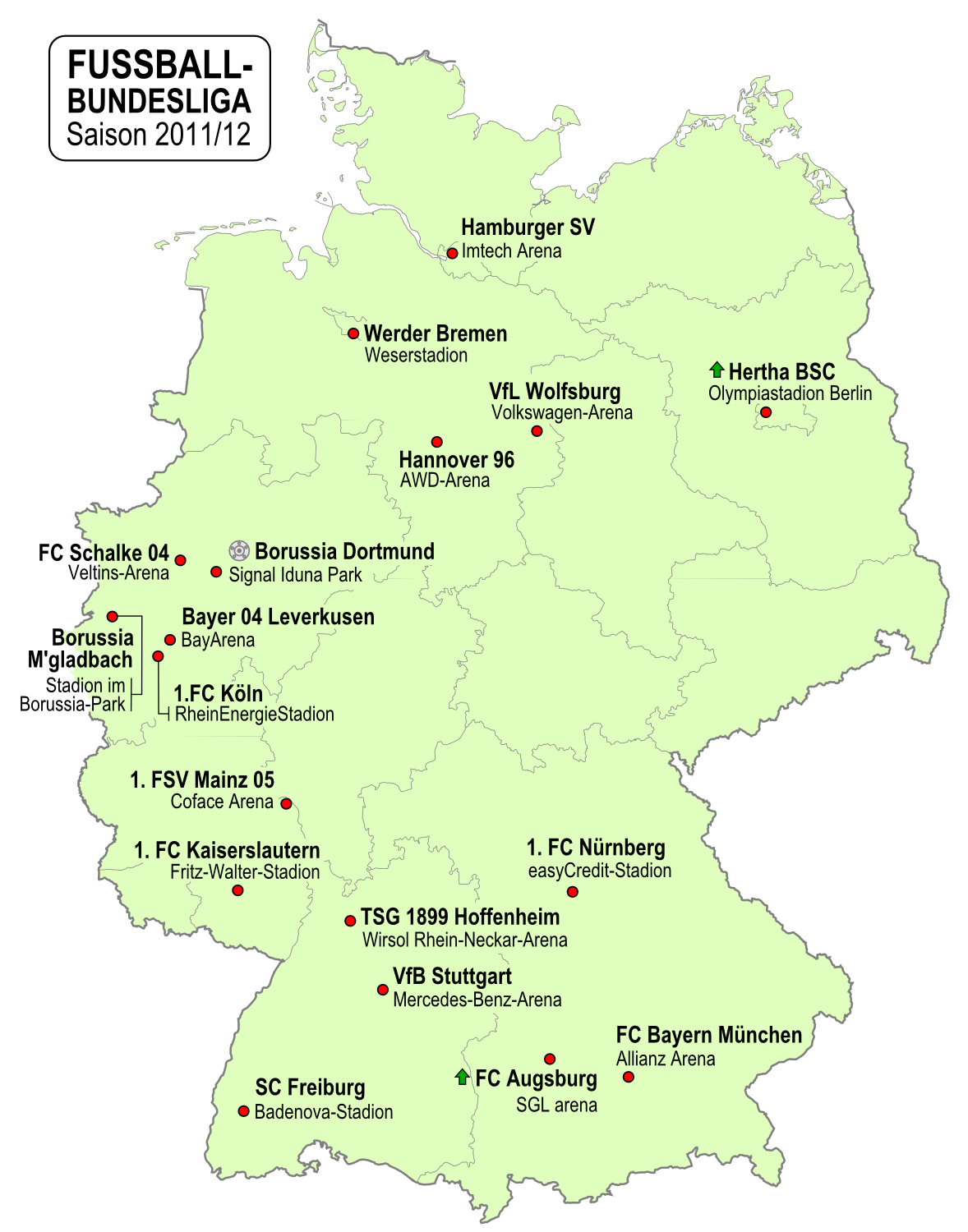
- Season: 2011–12
- Dates: 5 August 2011 – 5 May 2012
- Champions: Borussia Dortmund; 5th Bundesliga title 8th German title
- Relegated: Hertha BSC (via play-off); 1. FC Köln; 1. FC Kaiserslautern
- Champions League: Borussia Dortmund; Bayern Munich; Schalke 04; Bor. Mönchengladbach
- Europa League: Bayer Leverkusen; VfB Stuttgart; Hannover 96
- Matches: 306
- Goals: 875 (2.86 per match)
- Top goalscorer: Klaas-Jan Huntelaar (29 goals)
- Biggest home win: Bayern Munich 7–0 Freiburg
- Biggest away win: Hertha BSC 0–6 Bayern Munich
- Highest scoring: Werder Bremen 5–3 Freiburg; Bayern Munich 7–1 Hoffenheim; B. Dortmund 4–4 VfB Stuttgart
- Longest winning run: 8 matches Borussia Dortmund
- Longest unbeaten run: 28 matches by Borussia Dortmund
- Longest winless run: 21 matches by 1. FC Kaiserslautern
- Longest losing run: 6 matches by Hertha BSC; 1. FC Kaiserslautern
- Average attendance: 45,116

The 2011–12 Bundesliga was the 49th season of the Bundesliga, Germany's premier football league. The season started on 5 August 2011 with the opening match involving defending champions Borussia Dortmund and ended with the last games on 5 May 2012. The traditional winter break was held between the weekends around 17 December 2011 and 20 January 2012.

The league comprised eighteen teams: The best fifteen teams of the 2010–11 season, the best two teams from the 2010–11 2. Bundesliga, and the winners of the relegation play-off between the 16th-placed Bundesliga team and the third-placed 2. Bundesliga team.

Since Germany climbed from fourth to third place in the UEFA association coefficient rankings at the end of the 2010–11 season, the league gained an additional group stage berth for the UEFA Champions League.

== Teams ==
The league comprised eighteen teams: Eintracht Frankfurt and FC St. Pauli were directly relegated after finishing the 2010–11 season in the bottom two places. Frankfurt ended a six-year tenure in the Bundesliga, while St. Pauli only made a cameo one-year appearance in the top flight and directly returned to the second level.

The relegated teams were replaced by Hertha BSC, champions of the 2010–11 2. Bundesliga, and runners-up FC Augsburg. The Bavarian side made their debut at the highest level of football in Germany, while Hertha directly returned to the Bundesliga after just one year at the second tier.

A further place in the league was decided through a two-legged play-off between Borussia Mönchengladbach, the 16th-placed team of the 2010–11 Bundesliga, and VfL Bochum, the third-placed 2. Bundesliga team. Mönchengladbach won the series 2–1 on aggregate and therefore retained its Bundesliga spot.

=== Stadiums and locations ===
The most prominent change regarding stadiums occurred at Mainz, where FSV Mainz 05 moved from Stadion am Bruchweg into their newly built Coface Arena. Other changes included the completion of works at Mercedes-Benz Arena, which was converted to a football-only stadium during the 2009–10 and 2010–11 seasons, and the renaming of Impuls Arena, the ground of promoted team FC Augsburg, to SGL Arena effective from the beginning of the season after SGL Carbon acquired the naming rights for the structure in May 2011.

Locations of the 2011–12 Fußball-Bundesliga teams

Team	Location	Stadium	Capacity
FC Augsburg	Augsburg	SGL arena	30,660
Bayer Leverkusen	Leverkusen	BayArena	30,210
Bayern Munich	Munich	Allianz Arena	69,000
Borussia Dortmund	Dortmund	Signal Iduna Park	80,720
Borussia Mönchengladbach	Mönchengladbach	Stadion im Borussia-Park	54,057
SC Freiburg	Freiburg	Mage Solar Stadion	25,000
Hamburger SV	Hamburg	Imtech Arena	57,000
Hannover 96	Hanover	AWD-Arena	49,000
Hertha BSC	Berlin	Olympiastadion	74,244
1899 Hoffenheim	Sinsheim	Rhein-Neckar Arena	30,150
1. FC Kaiserslautern	Kaiserslautern	Fritz-Walter-Stadion	49,780
1. FC Köln	Cologne	RheinEnergieStadion	50,000
1. FSV Mainz 05	Mainz	Coface Arena	34,034
1. FC Nürnberg	Nuremberg	EasyCredit-Stadion	48,548
Schalke 04	Gelsenkirchen	Veltins-Arena	61,673
VfB Stuttgart	Stuttgart	Mercedes-Benz Arena	60,300
Werder Bremen	Bremen	Weserstadion	42,000
VfL Wolfsburg	Wolfsburg	Volkswagen Arena	30,000

=== Personnel and kits ===
In addition to the individual sponsorships of each club listed below, all teams used a league-wide ball named "Torfabrik" (goal factory), provided by Adidas; the ball was updated to a new design for the 2011–12 season.

Team	Manager	Captain	Kit manufacturer	Shirt sponsor
FC Augsburg	(Netherlands) Jos Luhukay	(Netherlands) Paul Verhaegh^{1}	Jako	AL-KO
Bayer Leverkusen	(Finland) Sami Hyypiä (caretaker)	(Germany) Simon Rolfes	adidas	SunPower
Bayern Munich	(Germany) Jupp Heynckes	(Germany) Philipp Lahm	adidas	T-Home (Home and Third), LIGAtotal (Away)
Borussia Dortmund	(Germany) Jürgen Klopp	(Germany) Sebastian Kehl	Kappa	Evonik
Borussia Mönchengladbach	(Switzerland) Lucien Favre	(Belgium) Filip Daems	Lotto	Postbank
SC Freiburg	(Germany) Christian Streich	(Germany) Julian Schuster	Nike	Ehrmann
Hamburger SV	(Germany) Thorsten Fink	(Germany) Heiko Westermann	adidas	Emirates
Hannover 96	(Germany) Mirko Slomka	(United States) Steve Cherundolo	Jako	TUI
Hertha BSC	(Germany) Otto Rehhagel	(Croatia) Andre Mijatović	Nike	Deutsche Bahn
1899 Hoffenheim	(Germany) Markus Babbel	(Germany) Andreas Beck	Puma	Suntech
1. FC Kaiserslautern	(Bulgaria) Krasimir Balakov	(Germany) Christian Tiffert	uhlsport	Allgäuer Latschenkiefer
1. FC Köln	(Germany) Frank Schaefer	(Brazil) Pedro Geromel	Reebok	REWE
1. FSV Mainz 05	(Germany) Thomas Tuchel	(North Macedonia) Nikolče Noveski	Nike	Entega
1. FC Nürnberg	(Germany) Dieter Hecking	(Germany) Raphael Schäfer	adidas	Areva
Schalke 04	(Netherlands) Huub Stevens	(Germany) Benedikt Höwedes	adidas	Gazprom
VfB Stuttgart	(Germany) Bruno Labbadia	(Germany) Serdar Tasci^{3}	Puma	Gazi
Werder Bremen	(Germany) Thomas Schaaf	(Germany) Clemens Fritz^{2}	Nike	Targobank
VfL Wolfsburg	(Germany) Felix Magath	(Germany) Christian Träsch	adidas	Volkswagen/Up!

Notes

1. FC Augsburg have determined Paul Verhaegh as new captain, after incumbent Uwe Möhrle was transferred to Energie Cottbus during the 2011–12 winter transfer window.
2. Werder Bremen have determined Clemens Fritz as new captain after Per Mertesacker, who was assigned by coach Thomas Schaaf at the beginning of the season, was transferred to Premier League side Arsenal on 31 August 2011.
3. VfB Stuttgart have determined Serdar Tasci as new captain after Matthieu Delpierre, who was captain since 1 December 2009, asked, not to be appointed as captain again.

=== Managerial changes ===
Team	Outgoing manager	Manner of departure	Date of vacancy	Position in table	Incoming manager	Date of appointment
Bayer Leverkusen	(Germany) Jupp Heynckes	End of contract	30 June 2011	Off-season	(Germany) Robin Dutt	1 July 2011
Bayern Munich	(Netherlands) Andries Jonker	End of tenure as caretaker	30 June 2011	Off-season	(Germany) Jupp Heynckes	1 July 2011
SC Freiburg	(Germany) Robin Dutt	Bayer Leverkusen purchased rights	30 June 2011	Off-season	(Germany) Marcus Sorg	1 July 2011
1899 Hoffenheim	(Germany) Marco Pezzaiuoli	Mutual consent	30 June 2011	Off-season	(Germany) Holger Stanislawski	1 July 2011
1. FC Köln	(Germany) Volker Finke	End of tenure as caretaker	30 June 2011	Off-season	(Norway) Ståle Solbakken	1 July 2011
Hamburger SV	(Germany) Michael Oenning	Sacked	19 September 2011	18th	(Argentina) Rodolfo Cardoso (caretaker)	19 September 2011
FC Schalke 04	(Germany) Ralf Rangnick	Resigned	22 September 2011	9th	(Netherlands) Huub Stevens	27 September 2011
Hamburger SV	(Argentina) Rodolfo Cardoso (caretaker)	End of tenure as caretaker	10 October 2011	18th	(Germany) Thorsten Fink	13 October 2011
Hertha BSC	(Germany) Markus Babbel	Sacked	18 December 2011	11th	(Germany) Michael Skibbe	22 December 2011
SC Freiburg	(Germany) Marcus Sorg	Sacked	29 December 2011	18th	(Germany) Christian Streich	29 December 2011
1899 Hoffenheim	(Germany) Holger Stanislawski	Sacked	9 February 2012	8th	(Germany) Markus Babbel	10 February 2012
Hertha BSC	(Germany) Michael Skibbe	Sacked	12 February 2012	15th	(Germany) Otto Rehhagel	18 February 2012
1. FC Kaiserslautern	(Germany) Marco Kurz	Sacked	20 March 2012	18th	(Bulgaria) Krasimir Balakov	22 March 2012
Bayer Leverkusen	(Germany) Robin Dutt	Sacked	1 April 2012	6th	(Finland) Sami Hyypiä (caretaker)	1 April 2012
1. FC Köln	(Norway) Ståle Solbakken	Sacked	12 April 2012	16th	(Germany) Frank Schaefer	12 April 2012

== League table ==
Pos	Team	Pld	W	D	L	GF	GA	GD	Pts	Qualification or relegation
1	Borussia Dortmund (C)	34	25	6	3	80	25	+55	81	Qualification to Champions League group stage
2	Bayern Munich	34	23	4	7	77	22	+55	73	Qualification to Champions League group stage
3	Schalke 04	34	20	4	10	74	44	+30	64	Qualification to Champions League group stage
4	Borussia Mönchengladbach	34	17	9	8	49	24	+25	60	Qualification to Champions League play-off round
5	Bayer Leverkusen	34	15	9	10	52	44	+8	54	Qualification to Europa League group stage (Note: The 2011–12 DFB-Pokal champions (Borussia Dortmund) and runners-up (Bayern Munich) qualified for the 2012–13 UEFA Champions League, thus the three Europa League places were distributed through league positions.)
6	VfB Stuttgart	34	15	8	11	63	46	+17	53	Qualification to Europa League play-off round
7	Hannover 96	34	12	12	10	41	45	−4	48	Qualification to Europa League third qualifying round
8	VfL Wolfsburg	34	13	5	16	47	60	−13	44	
9	Werder Bremen	34	11	9	14	49	58	−9	42	
10	1. FC Nürnberg	34	12	6	16	38	49	−11	42	
11	1899 Hoffenheim	34	10	11	13	41	47	−6	41	
12	SC Freiburg	34	10	10	14	45	61	−16	40	
13	FSV Mainz 05	34	9	12	13	47	51	−4	39	
14	FC Augsburg	34	8	14	12	36	49	−13	38	
15	Hamburger SV	34	8	12	14	35	57	−22	36	
16	Hertha BSC (R)	34	7	10	17	38	64	−26	31	Qualification to relegation play-offs
17	1. FC Köln (R)	34	8	6	20	39	75	−36	30	Relegation to 2. Bundesliga
18	1. FC Kaiserslautern (R)	34	4	11	19	24	54	−30	23	Relegation to 2. Bundesliga

Source: kicker
Rules for classification: 1) points; 2) goal difference; 3) number of goals scored.
(C) Champions; (R) Relegated

== Results ==
Home \ Away	FCA	BSC	SVW	BVB	SCF	HSV	H96	TSG	FCK	KOE	B04	M05	BMG	FCB	FCN	S04	VFB	WOB
FC Augsburg	—	3–0	1–1	0–0	2–2	1–0	0–0	0–2	2–2	2–1	1–4	2–1	1–0	1–2	0–0	1–1	1–3	2–0
Hertha BSC	2–2	—	1–0	0–1	1–2	1–2	0–1	3–1	1–2	3–0	3–3	0–0	1–2	0–6	0–1	1–2	1–0	1–4
Werder Bremen	1–1	2–1	—	0–2	5–3	2–0	3–0	1–1	2–0	3–2	1–1	0–3	2–2	1–2	0–1	2–3	2–0	4–1
Borussia Dortmund	4–0	1–2	1–0	—	4–0	3–1	3–1	3–1	1–1	5–0	1–0	2–1	2–0	1–0	2–0	2–0	4–4	5–1
SC Freiburg	1–0	2–2	2–2	1–4	—	1–2	1–1	0–0	2–0	4–1	0–1	1–2	1–0	0–0	2–2	2–1	1–2	3–0
Hamburger SV	1–1	2–2	1–3	1–5	1–3	—	1–0	2–0	1–1	3–4	1–1	0–0	0–1	1–1	2–0	1–2	0–4	1–1
Hannover 96	2–2	1–1	3–2	2–1	0–0	1–1	—	2–1	2–1	4–1	0–0	1–1	2–1	2–1	1–0	2–2	4–2	2–0
1899 Hoffenheim	2–2	1–1	1–2	1–0	1–1	4–0	0–0	—	1–1	1–1	0–1	1–1	1–0	0–0	2–3	1–1	1–2	3–1
1. FC Kaiserslautern	1–1	1–1	0–0	2–5	1–0	0–1	1–1	1–2	—	0–1	0–2	3–1	1–2	0–3	0–2	1–4	0–2	0–0
1. FC Köln	3–0	1–0	1–1	1–6	4–0	0–1	2–0	2–0	1–1	—	0–2	1–1	0–3	1–4	1–2	1–4	1–1	0–3
Bayer Leverkusen	4–1	3–3	1–0	0–0	0–2	2–2	1–0	2–0	3–1	1–4	—	3–2	1–2	2–0	0–3	0–1	2–2	3–1
Mainz 05	0–1	1–3	1–3	1–2	3–1	0–0	1–1	0–4	4–0	4–0	2–0	—	0–3	3–2	2–1	2–4	3–1	0–0
Borussia Mönchengladbach	0–0	0–0	5–0	1–1	0–0	1–1	2–1	1–2	1–0	3–0	2–2	1–0	—	3–1	1–0	3–0	1–1	4–1
Bayern Munich	2–1	4–0	4–1	0–1	7–0	5–0	2–1	7–1	2–0	3–0	3–0	0–0	0–1	—	4–0	2–0	2–0	2–0
1. FC Nürnberg	1–0	2–0	1–1	0–2	1–2	1–1	1–2	0–2	1–0	2–1	1–4	3–3	1–0	0–1	—	4–1	2–2	1–3
Schalke 04	3–1	4–0	5–0	1–2	4–2	3–1	3–0	3–1	1–2	5–1	2–0	1–1	1–0	0–2	4–0	—	3–1	4–0
VfB Stuttgart	2–1	5–0	4–1	1–1	4–1	1–2	3–0	2–0	0–0	2–2	0–1	4–1	0–3	1–2	1–0	3–0	—	3–2
VfL Wolfsburg	1–2	2–3	3–1	1–3	3–2	2–1	4–1	1–2	1–0	1–0	3–2	2–2	0–0	0–1	2–1	2–1	1–0	—

Source: DFB
Legend: Blue = home team win; Yellow = draw; Red = away team win.

== Promotion/relegation play-offs ==
Hertha BSC as 16th-placed team faced third-placed 2011–12 2. Bundesliga side Fortuna Düsseldorf in a two-legged play-off. Fortuna Düsseldorf won 4–3 on aggregate and thus were promoted for the 2012–13 Bundesliga season while Hertha BSC were relegated to the 2012–13 2. Bundesliga.

Following the second leg, which was marred by several incidents of crowd disturbances, Hertha appealed the result. On 21 May the DFB Sports Court rejected this appeal, having considered that these crowd disturbances did not psychologically impinge the Hertha players and that the referee's handling of the situation was sound. However, Hertha appealed again, this time to the Federal Court of the German FA. On 25 May, the Federal Court of the German FA also rejected the appeal. On 19 June, Hertha BSC decided not to appeal the decision, marking their immediate return to the 2. Bundesliga.

10 May 2012
20:30 CEST

Hertha BSC	1–2	Fortuna Düsseldorf
Hubník 19'	Report	Bröker 64'; Ramos 71' (o.g.)

Olympic Stadium, Berlin
Attendance: 68,041
Referee: Marco Fritz (Korb)

15 May 2012
20:30 CEST

Fortuna Düsseldorf	2–2	Hertha BSC
Beister 1'; Jovanović 59'	Report	Ben-Hatira 22'; Raffael 85'

Esprit Arena, Düsseldorf
Attendance: 51,000
Referee: Wolfgang Stark (Ergolding)

== Season statistics ==
=== Top scorers ===
Rank	Player	Club	Goals
1	(Netherlands) Klaas-Jan Huntelaar	Schalke 04	29
2	(Germany) Mario Gómez	Bayern Munich	26
3	(Poland) Robert Lewandowski	Borussia Dortmund	22
4	(Peru) Claudio Pizarro	Werder Bremen	18
4	(Germany) Lukas Podolski	Köln	18
4	(Germany) Marco Reus	Borussia Mönchengladbach	18
7	(Austria) Martin Harnik	VfB Stuttgart	17
8	(Germany) Stefan Kießling	Bayer Leverkusen	16
9	(Spain) Raúl	Schalke 04	15
10	(Bosnia and Herzegovina) Vedad Ibišević	1899 Hoffenheim / VfB Stuttgart	13
10	(Japan) Shinji Kagawa	Borussia Dortmund	13

== Attendances ==
No.	Team	Matches	Total	Average
1	Borussia Dortmund	17	1,368,860	80,521
2	Bayern München	17	1,173,000	69,000
3	Schalke 04	17	1,040,714	61,218
4	VfB Stuttgart	17	936,524	55,090
5	Hamburger SV	17	908,910	53,465
6	Hertha BSC	17	908,630	53,449
7	Borussia Mönchengladbach	17	881,376	51,846
8	1. FC Köln	17	807,200	47,482
9	Hannover 96	17	762,035	44,826
10	1. FC Kaiserslautern	17	721,382	42,434
11	1. FC Nürnberg	17	713,463	41,968
12	Werder Bremen	17	693,733	40,808
13	Mainz 05	17	559,470	32,910
14	FC Augsburg	17	514,406	30,259
15	Bayer Leverkusen	17	484,397	28,494
16	1899 Hoffenheim	17	476,450	28,026
17	VfL Wolfsburg	17	469,446	27,614
18	SC Freiburg	17	385,500	22,676
