= Martin Amedick =

German footballer

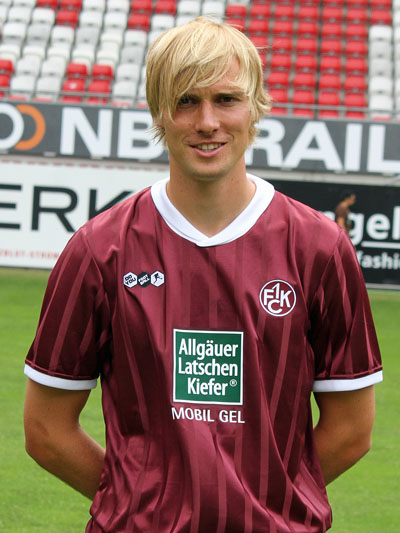

Personal information
- Full name: Martin Amedick
- Date of birth: 6 September 1982 (age 44)
- Place of birth: Paderborn, West Germany
- Height: 1.94 m (6 ft 4 1/2 in)
- Position: Centre back

Youth career
- 1987–1995: Delbrücker SC
- 1995–1998: SC Paderborn 07
- 1998–2001: Arminia Bielefeld

Senior career*
Years	Team	Apps	(Gls)
2001–2004	Arminia Bielefeld	1	(0)
2001–2004	Arminia Bielefeld II	46	(3)
2004–2006	Eintracht Braunschweig	62	(2)
2006–2008	Borussia Dortmund II	14	(1)
2006–2008	Borussia Dortmund	34	(2)
2008–2012	1. FC Kaiserslautern	105	(10)
2012–2013	Eintracht Frankfurt	2	(0)
2013–2014	SC Paderborn 07	7	(0)
2014–2015	SC Paderborn 07 II	3	(0)
- * Club domestic league appearances and goals as of 23 October 2022

Martin Amedick (born 6 September 1982) is a German retired professional footballer who played as a centre back.

== Career statistics ==
Appearances and goals by club, season and competition
Club	Season	League			DFB-Pokal		Other		Total	
Club	Season	Division	Apps	Goals	Apps	Goals	Apps	Goals	Apps	Goals
Arminia Bielefeld	2001–02	2. Bundesliga	0	0	0	0	—		0	0
Arminia Bielefeld	2002–03	Bundesliga	0	0	0	0	—		0	0
Arminia Bielefeld	2003–04	2. Bundesliga	1	0	0	0	—		1	0
Arminia Bielefeld	Total		1	0	0	0	0	0	1	0
Eintracht Braunschweig	2004–05	Regionalliga Nord	35	1	3	0	—		38	1
Eintracht Braunschweig	2005–06	2. Bundesliga	27	1	2	0	—		29	1
Eintracht Braunschweig	Total		62	2	5	0	0	0	67	2
Borussia Dortmund	2006–07	Bundesliga	18	2	1	0	—		19	2
Borussia Dortmund	2007–08	Bundesliga	16	0	3	0	—		19	0
Borussia Dortmund	Total		34	2	4	0	0	0	39	2
Borussia Dortmund II	2006–07	Regionalliga Nord	4	0	—		—		4	0
Borussia Dortmund II	2007–08	Regionalliga Nord	10	0	—		—		10	0
Borussia Dortmund II	Total		14	0	0	0	0	0	16	0
1. FC Kaiserslautern	2008–09	2. Bundesliga	31	4	1	0	—		32	4
1. FC Kaiserslautern	2009–10	2. Bundesliga	34	4	3	0	—		37	4
1. FC Kaiserslautern	2010–11	Bundesliga	26	2	4	0	—		30	2
1. FC Kaiserslautern	2011–12	Bundesliga	14	0	2	0	—		16	0
1. FC Kaiserslautern	Total		105	10	10	0	0	0	115	10
Eintracht Frankfurt	2011–12	2. Bundesliga	2	0	0	0	—		2	0
Eintracht Frankfurt II	2012–13	Regionalliga Südwest	2	0	0	0	—		2	0
SC Paderborn 07	2013–14	2. Bundesliga	7	0	1	0	—		8	0
Career total			231	14	21	0	0	0	252	14

== Honours ==
=== Club ===
Borussia Dortmund

- DFB-Pokal runner-up: 2007–08
