= Iliyan Mitsanski =

Bulgarian footballer (born 1985)

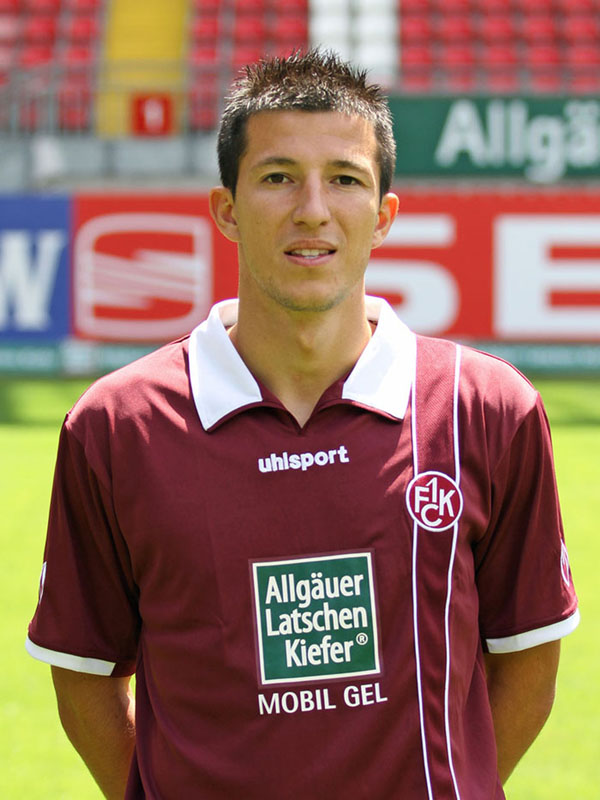
- Mitsanski with 1. FC Kaiserslautern in 2011

Personal information
- Full name: Iliyan Emilov Mitsanski
- Date of birth: 20 December 1985 (age 40)
- Place of birth: Sandanski, Bulgaria
- Height: 1.83 m (6 ft 0 in)
- Position: Striker

Senior career*
Years	Team	Apps	(Gls)
2003–2005	Pirin Blagoevgrad	37	(21)
2005–2006	Amica Wronki	17	(6)
2006–2008	Lech Poznań	12	(0)
2007	→ Korona Kielce (loan)	5	(0)
2008	→ Odra Wodzisław (loan)	13	(5)
2008–2010	Zagłębie Lubin	59	(40)
2010–2013	1. FC Kaiserslautern	16	(1)
2012	→ FSV Frankfurt (loan)	15	(9)
2013	→ Ingolstadt 04 (loan)	7	(1)
2013–2015	Karlsruher SC	49	(9)
2015	Suwon Bluewings	8	(0)
2016	Levski Sofia	9	(1)
2017	Korona Kielce	8	(3)
2018–2019	Slavia Sofia	19	(5)

International career
2010–2015	Bulgaria	17	(4)
- * Club domestic league appearances and goals

Iliyan Mitsanski (Bulgarian: Илиян Мицански; born 20 December 1985) is a Bulgarian former professional footballer who played as a striker. He played 17 times for the Bulgaria national team.

== Club career ==
=== In Bulgaria ===
Mitsanski started his professional football career at Pirin Blagoevgrad. In the 2004–05 season, he earned 29 appearances playing in the B PFG and scored 21 goals.

In June 2005, he moved to Polish club Amica Wronki.

In the first round of 2006–07 season he was loaned out to Korona Kielce, but was not able to reach the first squad there.

=== Zagłębie Lubin ===
In June 2008, Mitsanski transferred to Zagłębie Lubin. In the 2008–09 season, he became the top goalscorer for the team in the Polish First League with 26 goals, helping his team win promotion. During the next season he finished second goalscorer in the Polish league with 15 goals, just 2 goals behind the Polish rising star Robert Lewandowski.

=== 1. FC Kaiserslautern ===
On 18 June 2010, Mitsanski signed a four-year contract with 1. FC Kaiserslautern. On 24 July, he netted the only goal in the prestigious 1–0 win against Liverpool in a friendly match. On 22 September 2010, he made his official debut for his new team in the 0–5 away loss against Borussia Dortmund after coming on as a substitute for Erwin Hoffer. On 13 November 2010, he scored his first goal in the Bundesliga in the 3–3 home draw with VfB Stuttgart. He was unable to establish himself as a regular for the team and was loaned out to FSV Frankfurt during the winter break.

=== FSV Frankfurt ===
On 3 February 2012, Mitsanski made his debut for FSV Frankfurt and netted two goals in the 2–1 away win over MSV Duisburg in a 2. Bundesliga match.

=== Karlsruher SC ===
In June 2013, Mitsanski signed a contract with Karlsruher SC.

=== Levski Sofia ===
On 6 September 2016, Mitsanski made his return to Bulgarian football after 11 years abroad as he signed with PFC Levski Sofia until the end of the season. He was released in January 2017.

=== Korona Kielce ===
On 1 February 2017, Mitsanski signed with Korona Kielce. In the following three months he scored three goals in eight league games. Mitsanski was not offered a contract extension and left the club in June 2017.

=== Slavia Sofia ===
After a year without a club, Mitsanski signed with Slavia Sofia on 28 September 2018. He left the club my mutual consent in December 2019.

== International career ==
On 11 August 2010, Mitsanski made his debut for the Bulgarian national team in the 0–1 away loss against Russia in a friendly match. On 26 May 2012, he scored his first goal for the team against the Netherlands, which was a dramatic last-minute win. He scored his second international goal against Cyprus after coming off the substitutes bench in a friendly played on 15 August 2012.

On 9 September 2014, Mitsanski scored a goal for the 2–1 away win over Azerbaijan.

On 28 March 2015, he scored the second goal for Bulgaria during the 2–2 draw with Italy. He was sent off on 6 September 2015, in a 1–0 away loss against Italy after a tussle with Daniele De Rossi.

== Career statistics ==
=== Club ===
As of 20 December 2019

Appearances and goals by club, season and competition
Club	Season	League			Cup (Note: Includes Polish Cup, Ekstraklasa Cup, DFB-Pokal, Bulgarian Cup)		Continental		Total	
Club	Season	Division	Apps	Goals	Apps	Goals	Apps	Goals	Apps	Goals
Pirin Blagoevgrad	2003–04	A PFG	8	0			—		8	0
Pirin Blagoevgrad	2004–05	B PFG	29	21			—		29	21
Pirin Blagoevgrad	cols	Total	37	21			0	0	37	21
Amica Wronki	2005–06	Ekstraklasa	17	6	3	2	—		20	8
Lech Poznań	2006–07	Ekstraklasa	10	0	5	2	2 (Note: Appearances in UEFA Intertoto Cup)	0	17	2
Lech Poznań	2007–08	Ekstraklasa	2	0	4	0	—		6	0
Lech Poznań	Total		12	0	9	2	2	0	23	2
Korona Kielce (loan)	2006–07	Ekstraklasa	5	0	3	2	—		8	2
Odra Wodzisław (loan)	2007–08	Ekstraklasa	13	5	2	2	—		15	7
Zagłębie Lubin	2008–09	I liga	31	26	3	4	—		34	30
Zagłębie Lubin	2009–10	Ekstraklasa	28	14	1	1	—		29	15
Zagłębie Lubin	Total		59	40	4	5	0	0	63	45
1. FC Kaiserslautern	2010–11	Bundesliga	10	1	1	0	—		11	1
1. FC Kaiserslautern	2012–13	2. Bundesliga	6	0	0	0	—		6	0
1. FC Kaiserslautern	Total		16	1	1	0	0	0	17	1
FSV Frankfurt (loan)	2011–12	2. Bundesliga	15	9	0	0	—		15	9
Ingolstadt 04 (loan)	2012–13	2. Bundesliga	7	1	0	0	—		7	1
Karlsruher SC	2013–14	2. Bundesliga	19	4	1	0	—		20	4
Karlsruher SC	2014–15	2. Bundesliga	30	5	2	1	—		32	6
Karlsruher SC	Total		49	9	3	1	0	0	52	10
Suwon Bluewings	2015	K League 1	8	0	0	0	—		8	0
Levski Sofia	2016–17	First League	9	1	0	0	—		9	1
Korona Kielce	2016–17	Ekstraklasa	8	3	0	0	—		8	3
Slavia Sofia	2018–19	First League	16	4	1	0	—		17	4
Slavia Sofia	2019–20	First League	3	1	1	0	—		4	1
Slavia Sofia	Total		19	5	2	0	0	0	21	5
Career total			274	101	27	14	2	0	303	115

=== International ===
Appearances and goals by national team and year
National team	Year	Apps	Goals
Bulgaria	2010	1	0
Bulgaria	2011	0	0
Bulgaria	2012	5	2
Bulgaria	2013	3	0
Bulgaria	2014	3	1
Bulgaria	2015	5	1
Total		17	4

Scores and results list Bulgaria's goal tally first, score column indicates score after each Mitsanski goal.

List of international goals scored by Iliyan Mitsanski
No.	Date	Venue	Opponent	Score	Result	Competition
1	26 May 2012	Amsterdam Arena, Amsterdam	Netherlands	2–1	2–1	Friendly
2	15 August 2012	Georgi Asparuhov, Sofia	Cyprus	1–0	1–0	Friendly
3	9 September 2014	Bakcell Arena, Baku	Azerbaijan	1–0	2–1	UEFA Euro 2016 qualifying
4	28 March 2015	Vasil Levski National Stadium, Sofia	Italy	2–1	2–2	UEFA Euro 2016 qualifying

== Honours ==
Individual

- Bulgarian B Professional Football Group top scorer: 2004–05 (21 goals)
- I liga top scorer: 2008–09 (26 goals)
- Polish Cup top scorer: 2008–09 (4 goals)
- Ekstraklasa Player of the Month: March 2010
