= Erwin Hoffer =

Austrian footballer

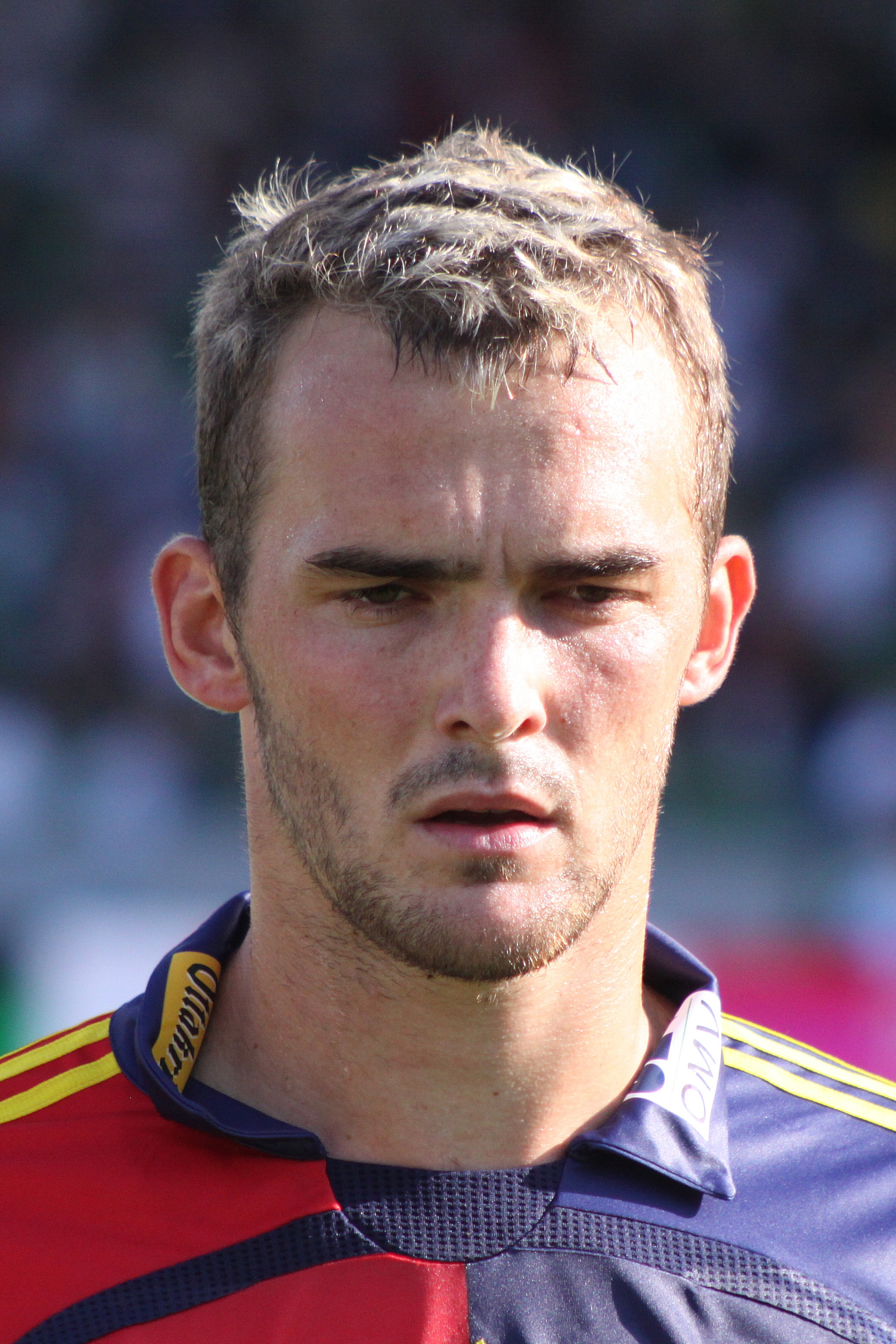
- Hoffer with Rapid Wien in 2009

Personal information
- Full name: Erwin Hoffer
- Date of birth: 14 April 1987 (age 39)
- Place of birth: Baden bei Wien, Austria
- Height: 1.76 m (5 ft 9 in)
- Position: Forward

Youth career
- 1994–1995: 1. SC Haidhof
- 1995–1998: FC Tribuswinkel
- 1998–2002: Badener AC
- 2002–2004: Admira Wacker

Senior career*
Years	Team	Apps	(Gls)
2004–2006	Admira Wacker	21	(4)
2006–2009	Rapid Wien	85	(41)
2009–2013	Napoli	8	(0)
2010–2011	→ 1. FC Kaiserslautern (loan)	24	(5)
2010–2011	→ 1. FC Kaiserslautern II (loan)	1	(3)
2011–2013	→ Eintracht Frankfurt (loan)	36	(10)
2013	→ 1. FC Kaiserslautern (loan)	14	(3)
2013–2015	Fortuna Düsseldorf	45	(13)
2015–2017	Karlsruher SC	50	(6)
2017–2019	Beerschot Wilrijk	50	(8)
2019–2021	Admira Wacker	45	(4)
Total		369	(97)

International career
2004–2005	Austria U17	13	(9)
2005	Austria U18	2	(0)
2005–2008	Austria U19	17	(5)
2007	Austria U20	10	(4)
2005–2008	Austria U21	17	(7)
2007–2012	Austria	28	(4)
- * Club domestic league appearances and goals

Erwin "Jimmy" Hoffer (born 14 April 1987) is an Austrian former professional footballer who played as a striker. He represented the Austria national football team at UEFA Euro 2008, and his 17-year playing career spanned several clubs in Austria, Italy, Germany and Belgium.

== Club career ==
=== Admira Wacker ===
Born in Baden bei Wien, Austria, Hoffer played for the youth teams such as 1. SC Haidhof, FC Tribuswinkel and Badener AC before joining Admira Wacker, where he started his professional career. After progressing through the ranks there, Hoffer started his professional career at 17 Admira Wacker, where he played from 2004 to 2006 in the first team. He also scored four times, including against Sturm Graz and Pasching.

=== Rapid Wien ===
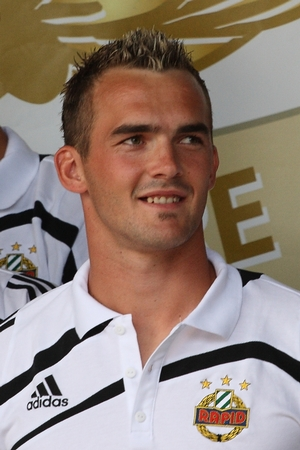
Hoffer attending the club's Open Day in 2009.

After a two-year spell, he moved to Rapid Wien where he was a replacement for Muhammet Akagündüz, who left for Turkish side Kayserispor.

Hoffer made his Rapid Wien debut on 29 July 2006, coming on as a second-half substitute, in a 1–0 loss against SV Ried. Having spent most of the season with the reserve, Hoffer then scored a brace on 13 May 2007, in a 2–0 win over Grazer AK. In his first season, Hoffer made 21 appearances and scored 4 times.

Having missed the start of the 2007–08 season, due to international commitment, Hoffer made his first appearance of the season, where he set up the only goal in the game, in a 1–0 win over SC Rheindorf Altach on 1 August 2007. On 3 November 2007, he scored his first goal of the season, as well as, setting up a goal, in a 4–0 win over SV Ried. He then scored twice on 16 February 2008, in a 2–0 win over Austria Kärnten. On 23 March 2008, he scored a hat-trick in their 7–0 victory against Red Bull Salzburg and assisted two times during the match as well. In the last three matches of the season, Hoffer scored three goals in three matches, including scoring decisive goal, in a 3–0 win over Rheindorf Altach on 21 April 2008, a victory that saw Rapid Wien win the Austrian Football Bundesliga title in the 2007–08 season. For this, Hoffer had his contract extended, keeping him until 2011.

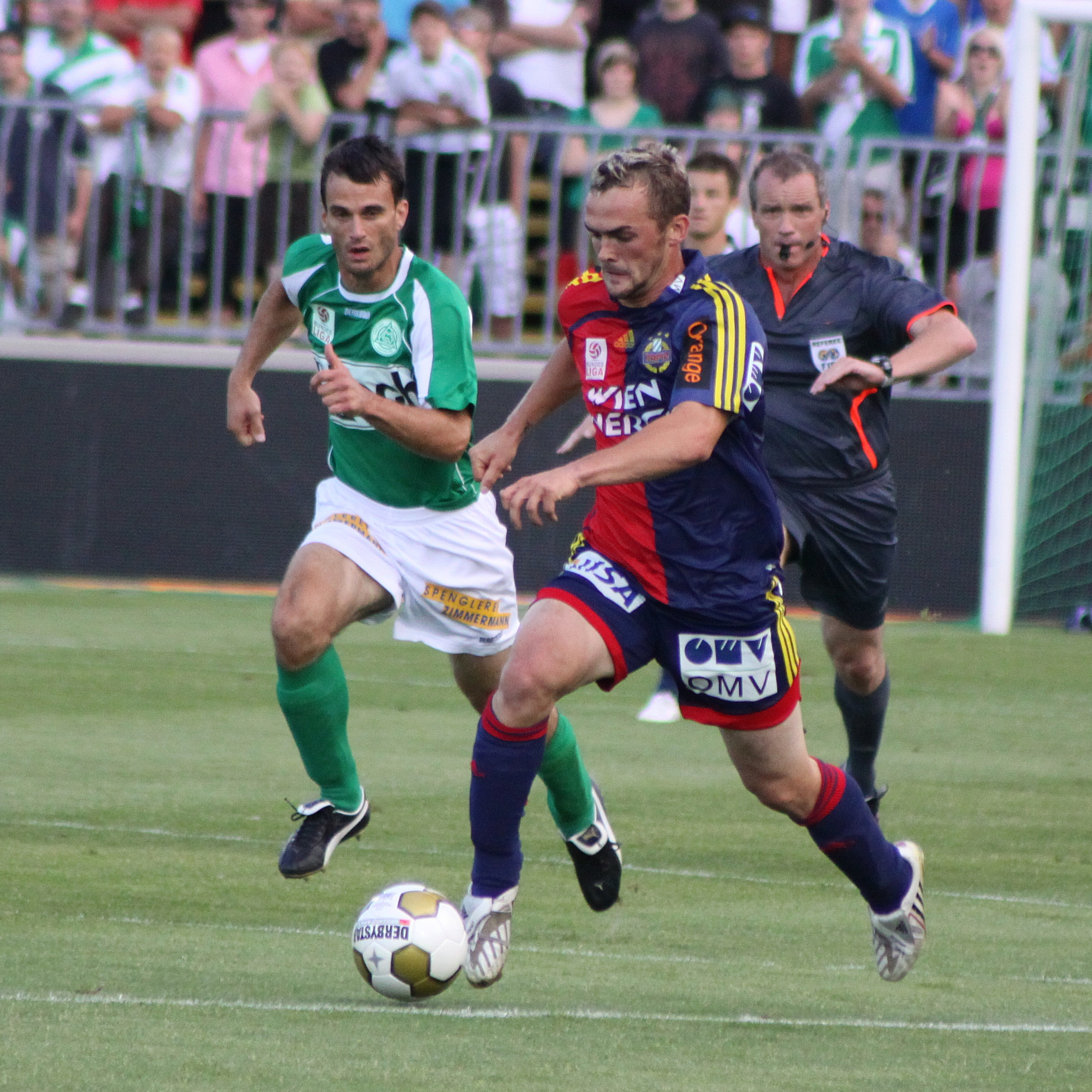
Hoffer playing for Rapid Wien in 2009.

In the 2008–09 season, Hoffer started the season well when he score 7 times in all competitions against Austria Kärnten, Anorthosis Famagusta, Rheindorf Altach (four times), and LASK Linz. After three months without scoring, Hoffer, once again, went on a goalscoring form throughout the end of the year, scoring against LASK Linz, Sturm Graz (twice), Rheindorf Altach (hat–trick), and Austria Wien. From 8 March 2009 to 21 March 2009, Hoffer scored five goals in three appearances, including two braces against Kapfenberger SV and Austria Kärnten. After suffering a muscle injury that kept him out on a short term, Hoffer then scored two hat–tricks against Red Bull Salzburg and Kapfenberger SV in May 2009. Finishing the 2008–09 season as second top scorer in the league behind Marc Janko, Hoffer made a total of 39 appearances scoring 29 times in all competitions.

At the end of the 2008–09 season, Hoffer attracted interests from clubs around Europe. Amid to the transfer move, Hoffer made two appearances for the side in the UEFA Europa League Qualification Round campaign against Vllaznia Shkodër, scoring in the first leg, with the result was 8–0 on aggregate for Rapid Wien. After Rapid Wien had denied that any clubs were interested in Hoffer, the agreement between Rapid Wien and Napoli was agreed.

=== Napoli ===
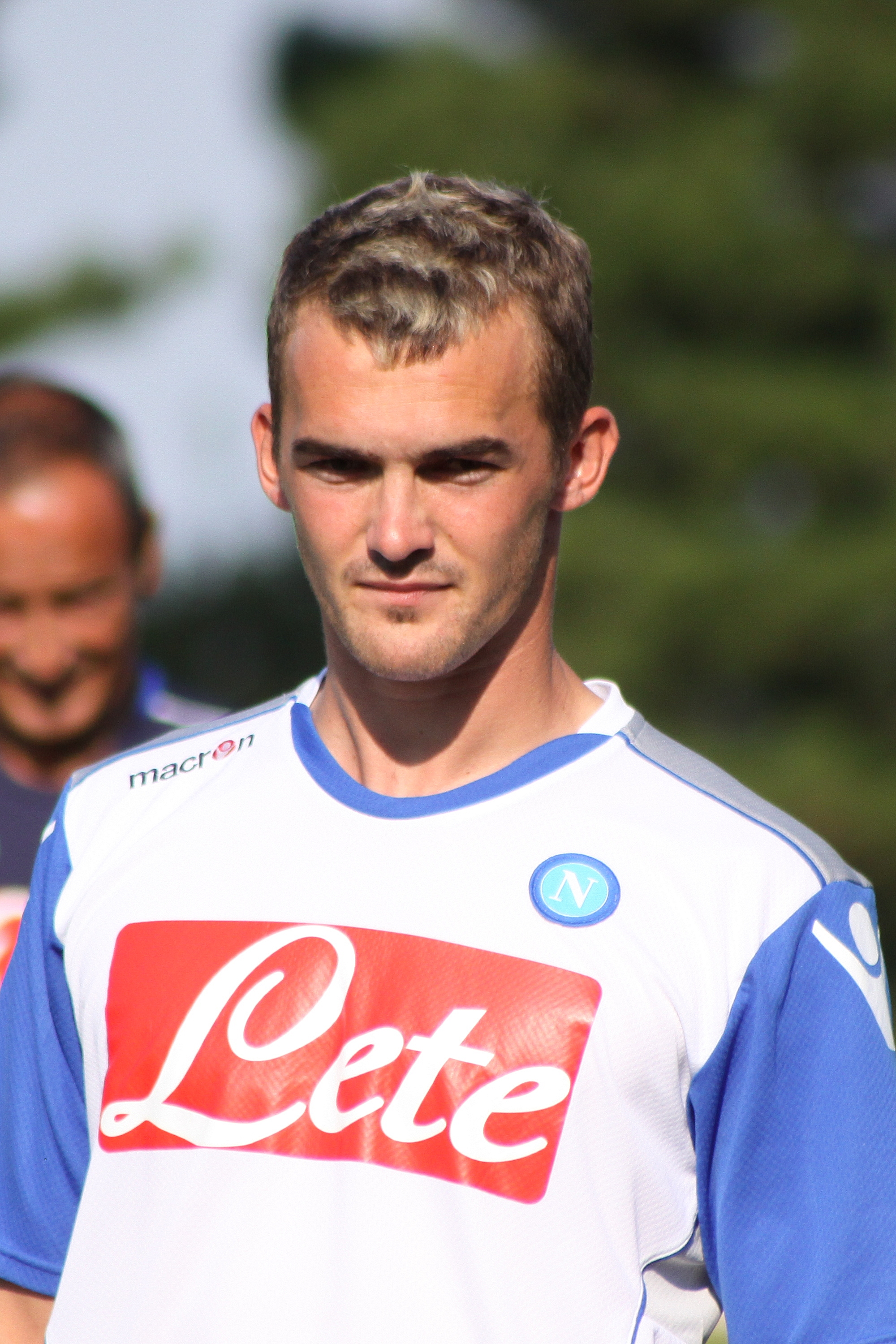
Hoffer during a training sessions at Napoli.

On 28 July 2009, Napoli signed the striker on a five-year deal, for €5 million.

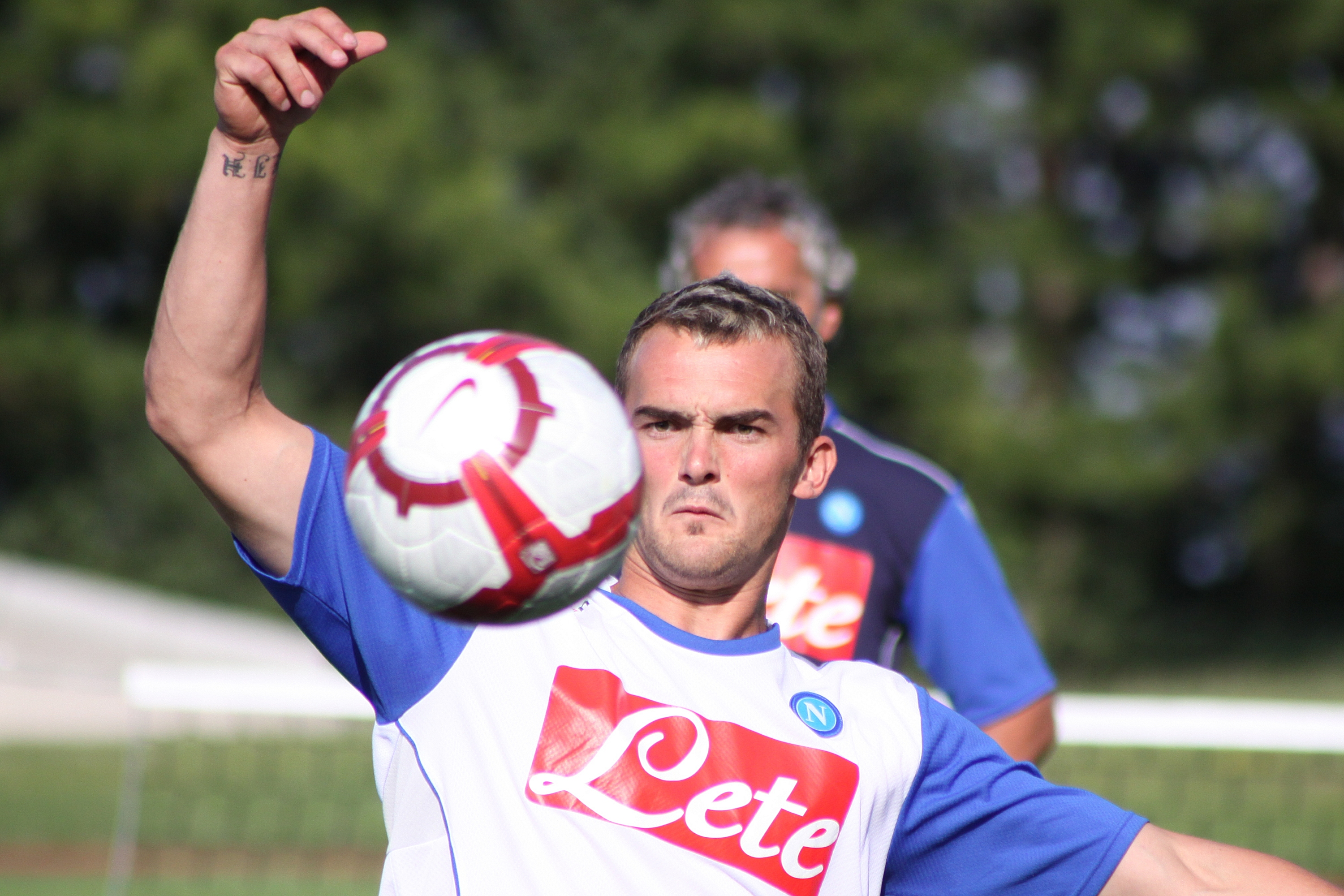
Hoffer dribbling the ball while training at Napoli.

Hoffer scored his first goal with the partenopei on his club debut on 16 August 2009 in 3–0 Coppa Italia win against Salernitana. After the match, Hoffer said about scoring his first goal: "I would say that there is nothing better than starting this way. I hoped I could enter the field and give my input, then the good ball came in." Two weeks later, on 30 August 2009, he made his league debut for Napoli, coming on as a late substitute, in a 3–1 win over Livorno. But as the 2009–10 season progressed, Hoffer found his first team opportunities limited at Napoli, due to striking form of Germán Denis and Fabio Quagliarella. He turned down a move to ChievoVerona in January 2010. Having spent the whole season on the substitute bench and a little playing time, Hoffer made a total of 11 appearances scoring once.

=== Loan spell at 1. FC Kaiserslautern ===
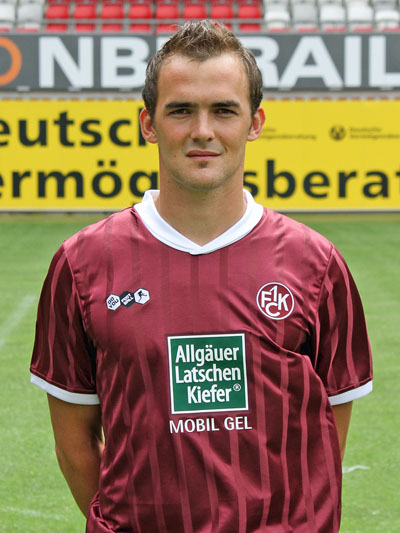
Hoffer during his first spell at Kaiserslautern in 2010.

Ahead of the 2010–11 season, Hoffer was linked with moves to German sides 1. FC Kaiserslautern and Mainz 05. Ultimately, he joined 1. FC Kaiserslautern on a season-long loan deal for the 2010–11 season, with no buy option. However, Hoffer expressed his unhappiness over lack of playing time at Napoli, with his first team opportunities there limited. Nevertheless, he hoped his move to Kaiserslautern would make an impact in Germany, unlike his time in Italy.

Hoffer made his debut for the club in a first round cup match against VfL Osnabrück, scoring two goals, having came on as a substitute for Iliyan Mitsanski, in a 3–2 win after extra time. A week later, on 21 August 2010, he made his league debut for the club, where he set up a goal for Ivo Iličević, in a 3–1 win over Köln. A month later, on 18 September 2010, he scored a brace in a 2–2 draw against Hoffenheim. However, Hoffer found himself within a competition in the first team, which saw him being on the substitute bench. He scored a hat–trick for the reserve side on 28 November 2010, in a 4–1 win over Wuppertaler SV. After briefly out of the first team, due to illness in February, Hoffer scored two weeks after returning from illness, in a 2–1 win over Freiburg on 12 March 2011. Hoffer finished the 2010–11 season with five goals in 27 appearances.

=== Loan at Eintracht Frankfurt ===
After his loan spell at 1. FC Kaiserslautern came to an end, Hoffer's next loan move was in the 2011–12 season to another German side, Eintracht Frankfurt, who had been relegated to 2. Bundesliga. He joined on a season-long loan, with the option of a permanent move. He was given a number 10 shirt ahead of the new season.

Hoffer made his Eintracht Frankfurt debut in the opening game of the season on 15 July 2011, where he started as a centre–forward and played 90 minutes, in a 3–2 win over Greuther Fürth. His first goal for the club came on 30 September 2011, in a 3–1 win over Union Berlin. Three weeks later, on 23 October 2011, Hoffer scored twice, in a 3–0 win over MSV Duisburg. By the end of 2011, he added two more goals. Since joining Eintracht Frankfurt, Hoffer struggled in the first team, due to competitions from other strikers. But by January, Hoffer managed to regain his first team place, forming a three-men attack alongside Alexander Meier and Mohammadou Idrissou. He then scored and set up two goals during the match, in a 6–1 win over FSV Frankfurt on 18 February 2012. He went on to add three more goals later in the season. Despite being sidelined for one match, Hoffer ended the 2011–12 season with the club promoted to the Bundesliga, having 31 appearances and scoring 9 times in all competitions.

Ahead of the 2012–13 season, Hoffer returned to Napoli after the club did not take up a permanent move for him. Instead, he re–joined Eintracht Frankfurt on loan for another season on 6 August 2012. He scored his 10th goal in his Eintracht Frankfurt career, in a 3–2 win over 1. FC Nürnberg on 21 September 2012. However, Hoffer struggled in the first team, due to competitions, and his own injury concern. As a result, Hoffer asked the club to terminate his loan deal, which the club accepted.

=== Loan at 1. FC Kaiserslautern (second spell) ===
Having ruled out a return move to Rapid Wien, Hoffer opted to join 1. FC Kaiserslautern again on loan for the rest of the season.

Hoffer re–debuted for the club on 4 February 2013, coming on as a second-half substitute, in a 1–0 win over 1860 Munich. In a next match against Dynamo Dresden on 8 February 2013, Hoffer scored his first FC Kaiserslautern goal since returning on his second loan spell, in a 3–0 win. Having established himself in the first team at 1. FC Kaiserslautern, he went on to score two more goals in 16 appearances for the side.

At the end of the 2012–13 season, Hoffer returned to his parent club. With his first team opportunities limited once more ahead of the 2013–14 season, Hoffer was linked a move to Fortuna Düsseldorf following the club's failure to sign Jeremy Bokila from Belgian side Zulte Waregem.

=== Fortuna Düsseldorf ===
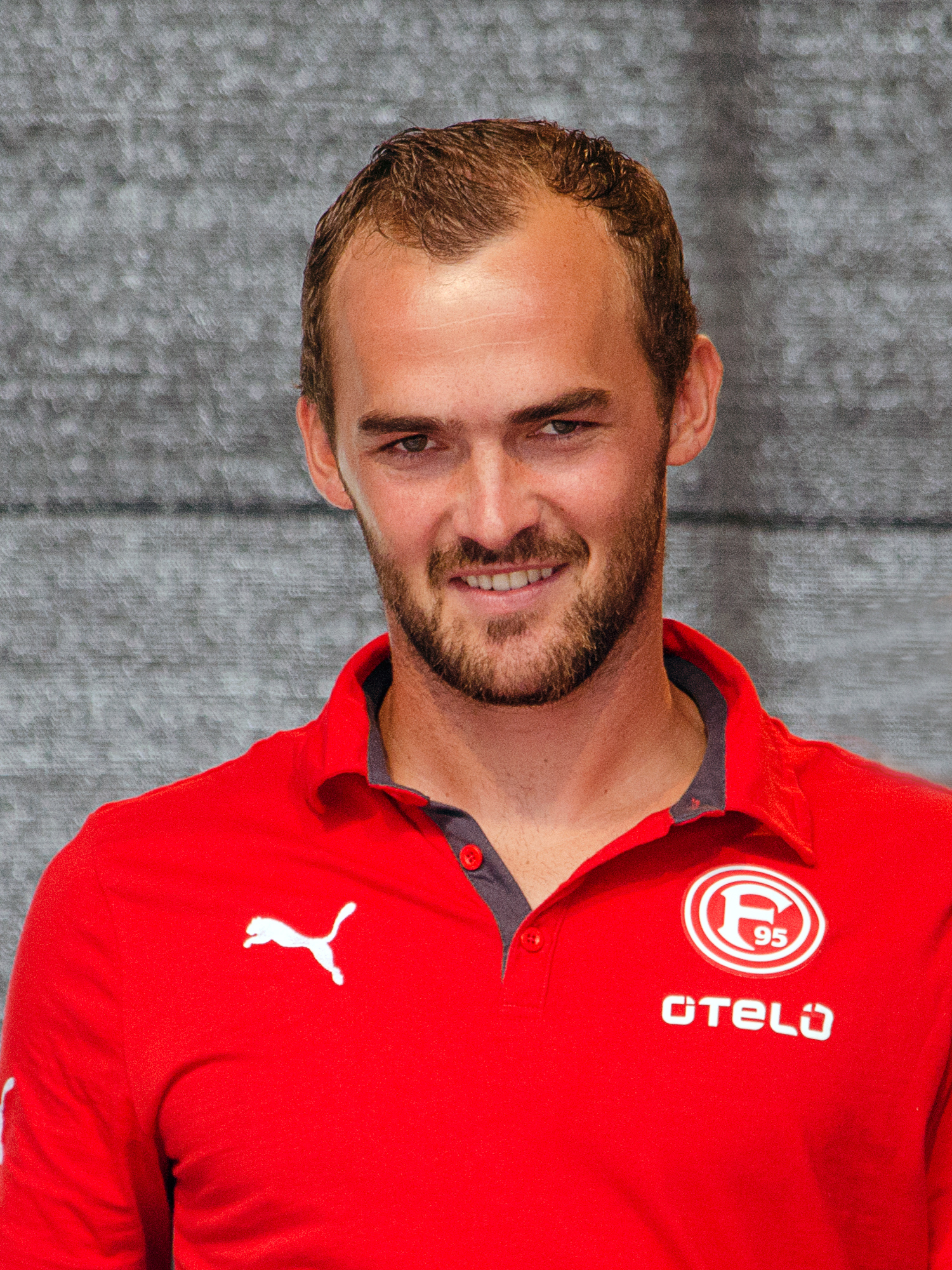
Hoffer pictured during his time at Fortuna Düsseldorf.

On 21 August 2013, Hoffer officially transferred to Fortuna Düsseldorf on a two-year deal, finally ending his miserable time at Napoli.

Hoffer made his Fortuna Düsseldorf debut on 30 August 2013, playing 30 minutes after coming on as a substitute, in a 4–2 loss against Arminia Bielefeld. On 9 December 2013, he scored his first goal for the club, in a 1–0 win over 1. FC Kaiserslautern. This was followed up by scoring two more goals against Energie Cottbus and 1. FC Köln. Since joining Fortuna Düsseldorf, Hoffer found himself in a competitions with strikers such as Charlison Benschop and Aristide Bancé which saw him placed on the substitute bench in the first half of the season. By the second half of the season, Hoffer managed to regain his first team place under the new management of Oliver Reck. He went on to score six more goals, including scoring four goals in three matches between 26 April 2014 and 11 May 2014 against Erzgebirge Aue (twice), Karlsruher SC and 1. FC Kaiserslautern. In his first season at Fortuna Düsseldorf, Hoffer made 24 appearances scoring 9 times.

In the 2014–15 season, Hoffer started the opening game of the season well when he set up a goal for Benschop, in a 2–2 draw against Eintracht Braunschweig. He then scored twice on 30 August 2014, in a 3–0 win over Erzgebirge Aue. This was followed up by scoring in the next game on 15 September 2014, in a 2–0 win over 1. FC Nürnberg. He and Benschop continued to form a striking partnership since the start of the 2014–15 season. However, Hoffer's form led him being replaced by Joel Pohjanpalo and was placed on the substitute bench for most of the season. Although he had some playing time, mostly coming on from the substitute bench, as well as, his own injury concerns, Hoffer scored again for the first time in eight months, in a 2–0 win over SV Sandhausen on 17 May 2015. In his second season at Fortuna Düsseldorf, Hoffer made 22 appearances scoring 4 times.

It was announced in April 2015 that Hoffer would be leaving the club at the end of the 2015–16 season after being told his contract was not to be renewed.

=== Karlsruher SC ===
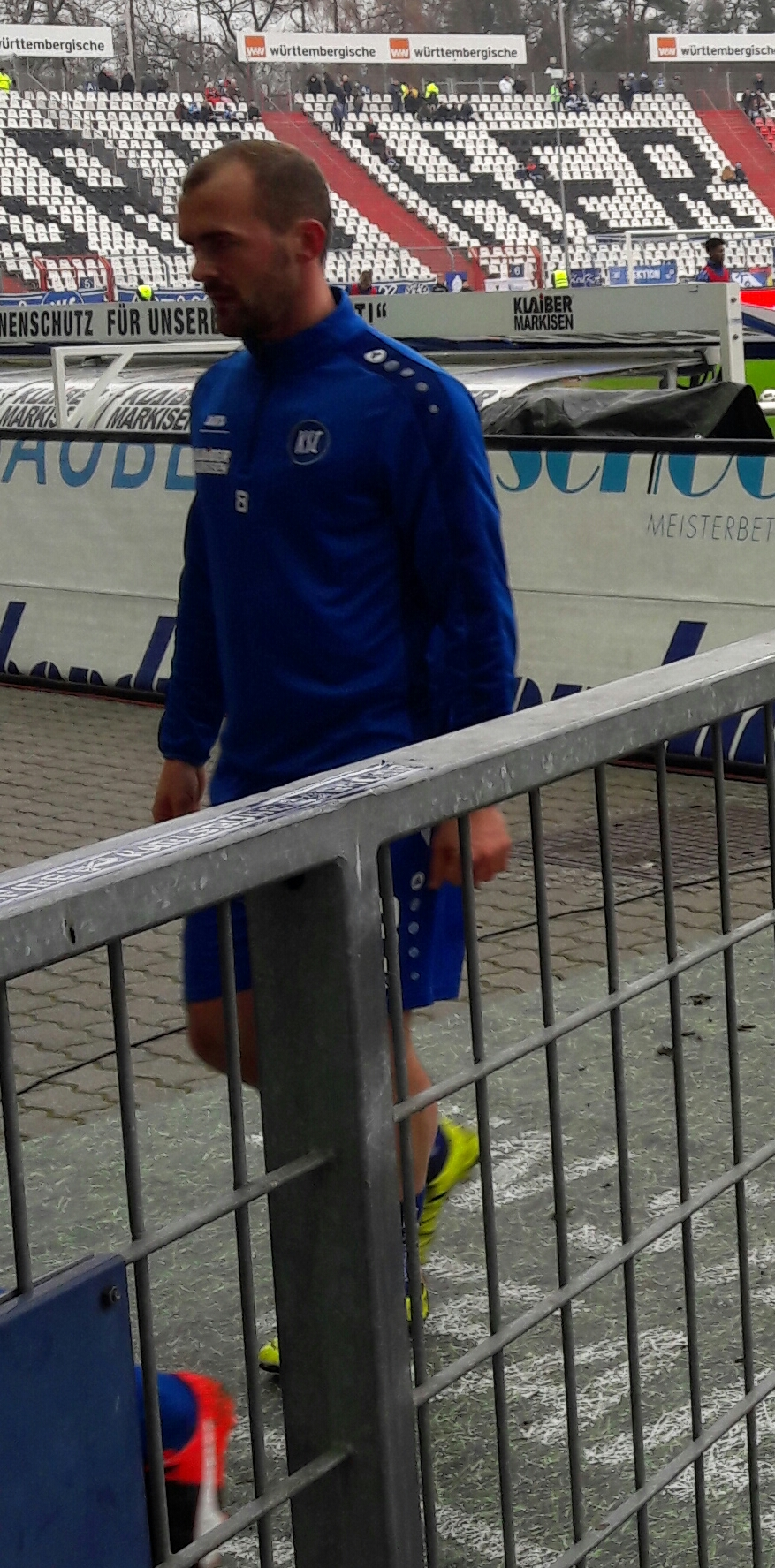
Hoffer pictured during his time at Karlsruher SC.

After leaving Fortuna Düsseldorf, Hoffer joined Karlsruher SC on 11 June 2015, signing a two–year contract, keeping him until 2017.

Hoffer made his Karlsruher SC debut in the opening game of the season, playing 45 minutes before coming off in the first half, in a 1–0 loss against Greuther Fürth. He then scored his first goal for Karlsruher SC on 14 August 2015, in a 2–1 win over FSV Frankfurt. This was followed up by scoring in the next game on 22 August 2015, in a 2–0 win over MSV Duisburg. By the end of 2015, he went to score two more goals, adding the tally to four goals this season. Since making his Karlsruher SC debut, Hoffer found himself in a competitions over a striking position with Pascal Köpke, Dimitrij Nazarov, Dimitrios Diamantakos and Vadim Manzon and played under manager Markus Kauczinski in a 4-4-2 tactics. However, Hoffer soon found himself out of the first team, spending time on the substitute bench. Hoffer finished his first season at the club with 28 appearances and four goals.

In the 2016–17 season, Hoffer continued to remain in the first team, though he stated that: "The coach decides, I'm ready for anything, I want to help the team." On 24 September 2016, he scored his first goal of the season, as well as, setting up a goal for Moritz Stoppelkamp, in a 2–0 win over Erzgebirge Aue. He scored again on 29 January 2017, in a 3–2 win over Arminia Bielefeld. However, Hoffer remained in a competition over a striking position with Diamantakos and Florian Kamberi. In March he sustained an injury in training. Despite this, Hoffer went on to make a total of 23 appearances and scoring two times.

At the end of the 2016–17 season, Hoffer was released by the club despite being offered a new contract by the club. During his time at Karlsruher SC, Hoffer quickly became the club's fan favourite.

=== KFCO Beerschot Wilrijk ===
After leaving Karlsruher SC, Hoffer signed for Belgium side Beerschot Wilrijk, based in the Belgian First Division B, signing a two–year contract on 11 September 2017. He was linked with a move back to Rapid Wien in the summer but it did not materialise.

Hoffer made his KFCO Beerschot Wilrijk debut on 16 September 2017, coming on as a substitute in the 81st minute and scoring three minutes later, in a 2–2 draw against Westerlo.

He left the club at the end of the 2018–19 season where his contract expired.

=== Return to Admira Wacker ===
On 8 August 2019 he returned to his first club, Admira Wacker.

== International career ==
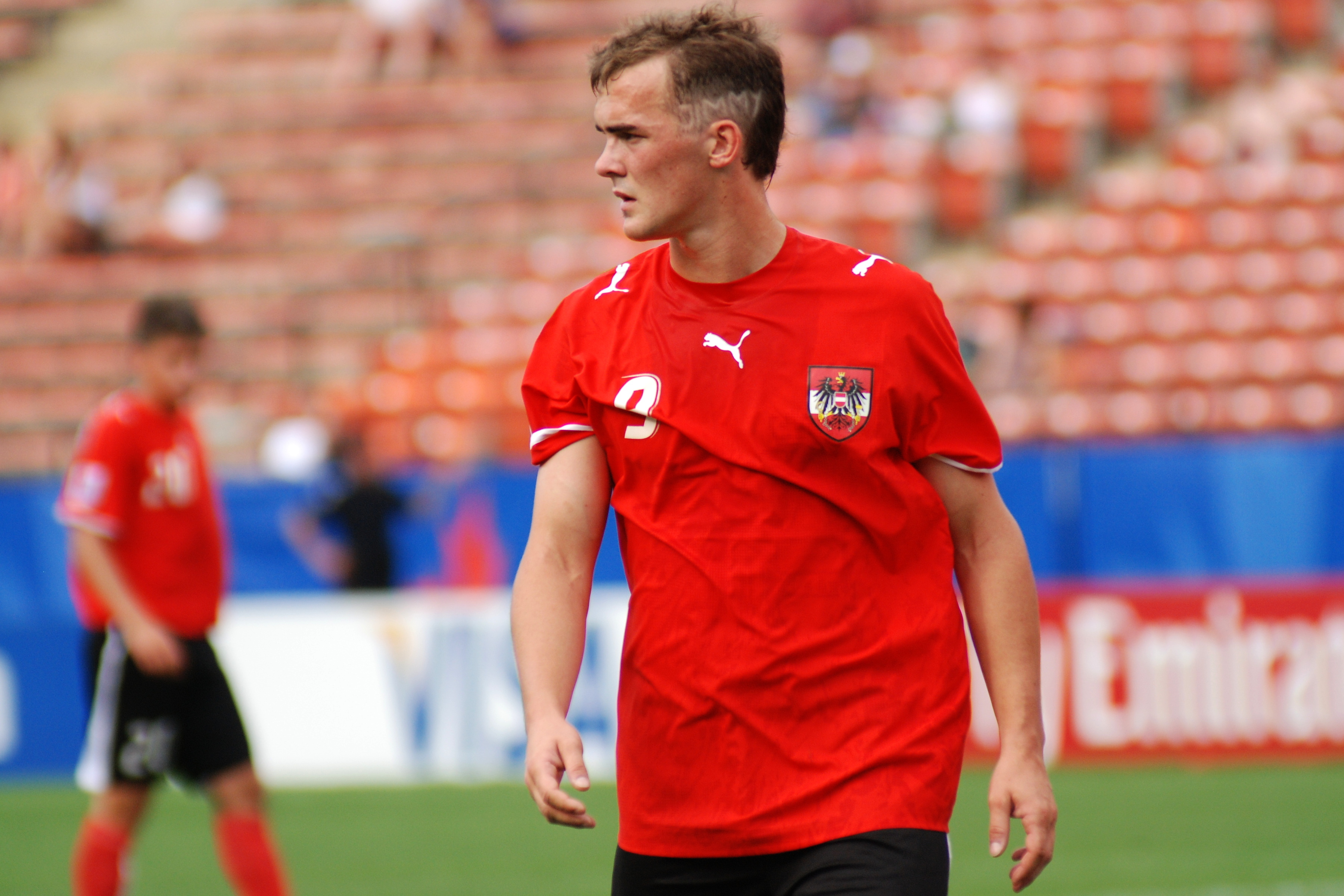
Erwin Hoffer participating for Austria in U-20 World Cup 2007.

=== Youth ===
Hoffer previously represented Austria levels. During the U-20 World Cup in Canada, Hoffer scored 3 times in 8 appearances in the tournament. As a result, Hoffer shaved the name "Jimmy" into one side of his head after receiving that nickname from a coach, Karl Brauneder. The nickname is a reference to Jimmy Hoffa.

=== Senior ===
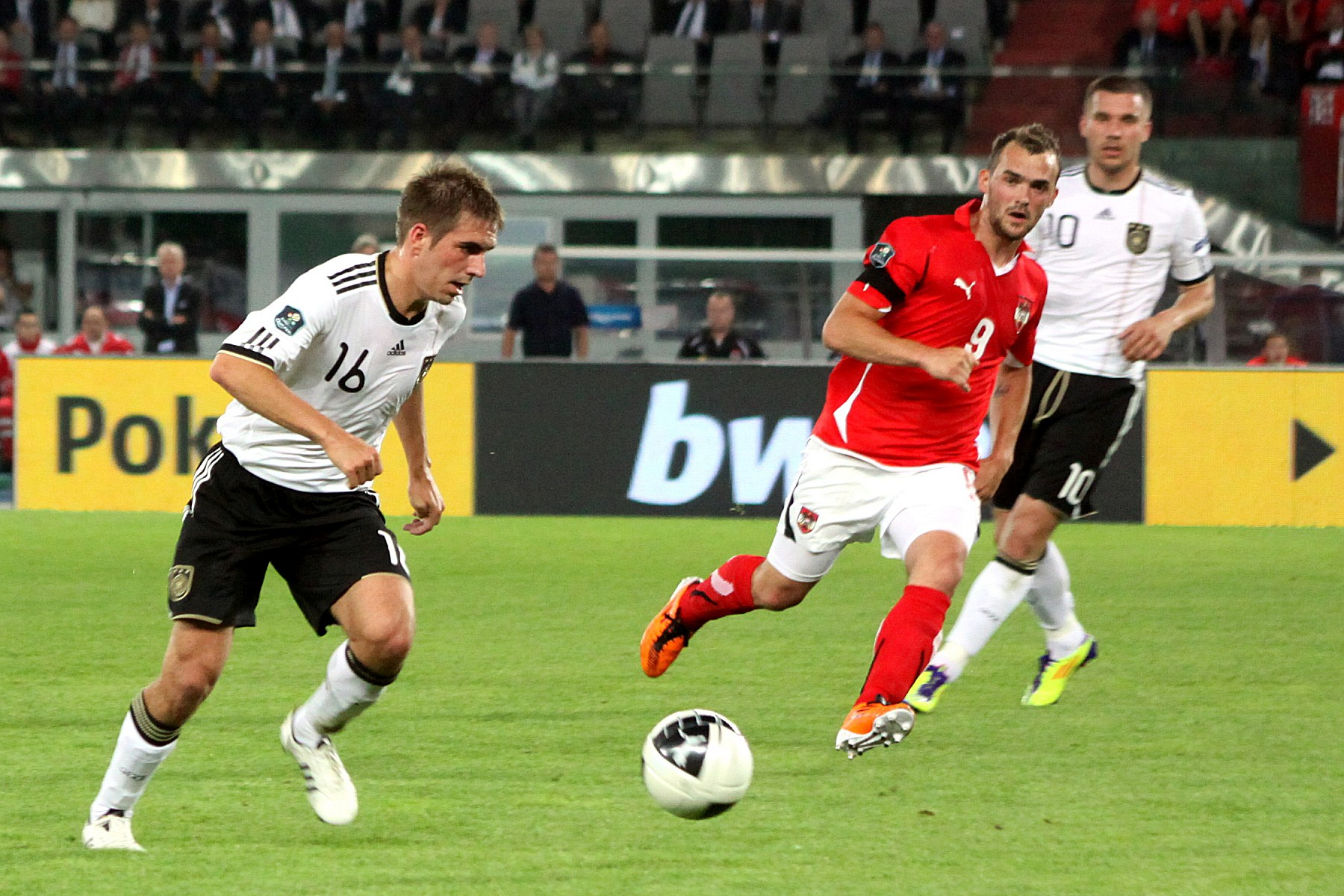
Hoffer playing for the senior national team against Germany on 3 June 2011.

In late–May 2007, Hoffer was called up by the senior national team for the first time and made his Austria debut on 2 June 2007, where he played 45 minutes, in a 0–0 draw against Paraguay.

He was part of the Austrian squad that played at Euro 2008, a competition, which Austria co-hosted along with Switzerland. The only match that Hoffer started in was their last group match against Germany in Vienna.

On 1 April 2009, Hoffer scored two goals for Austria in a 2–1 win over Romania in a Qualification match for the 2010 FIFA World Cup. After missing out two matches in the early 2010s, due to his lack of first team opportunities at Napoli, he made his first appearance in eight months, in a 1–0 loss against Switzerland on 11 August 2010. A month later, he scored again on 7 September 2010, in a 2–0 win over Kazakhstan. By 2012, Hoffer made 28 appearances and scoring 4 times for Austria.

== Personal life ==
Hoffer was born to a large family, as he has five sisters and three brothers. Growing up, Hoffer supported Rapid Wien.

Hoffer had his wisdom tooth removed on two occasions, starting from 2010, which had him to wearing a mask. He also owned two cars: Audi Q7 and Ferrari, which was banned from bringing it to training during his time at FC Kaiserslautern.

== Career statistics ==
=== Club ===
Appearances and goals by club, season and competition
Club	Season	League			Cup		Continental		Other		Total	
Club	Season	Division	Apps	Goals	Apps	Goals	Apps	Goals	Apps	Goals	Apps	Goals
Admira Wacker Mödling	2004–05	Austrian Bundesliga	4	0	0	0	—		—		4	0
Admira Wacker Mödling	2005–06	Austrian Bundesliga	17	4	0	0	—		—		17	4
Admira Wacker Mödling	Total		21	4	0	0	0	0	0	0	21	4
Rapid Wien	2006–07	Austrian Bundesliga	21	4	1	0	—		—		22	4
Rapid Wien	2007–08	Austrian Bundesliga	29	10	—		2 (Note: Appearances in the UEFA Cup)	0	—		31	10
Rapid Wien	2008–09	Austrian Bundesliga	34	27	3	1	2 (Note: Appearances in the UEFA Champions League)	1	—		39	29
Rapid Wien	2009–10	Austrian Bundesliga	1	0	0	0	2 (Note: Appearances in the UEFA Europa League)	1	—		3	1
Rapid Wien	Total		85	41	4	1	6	2	0	0	95	44
Napoli	2009–10	Serie A	8	0	3	1	—		—		11	1
1. FC Kaiserslautern (loan)	2010–11	Bundesliga	24	5	3	2	—		—		27	7
1. FC Kaiserslautern II (loan)	2010–11	Regionalliga West	1	3	—		—		—		1	3
Eintracht Frankfurt (loan)	2011–12	2. Bundesliga	30	9	1	0	—		—		31	9
Eintracht Frankfurt (loan)	2012–13	Bundesliga	6	1	0	0	—		—		6	1
Eintracht Frankfurt (loan)	Total		36	10	1	0	0	0	0	0	37	10
1. FC Kaiserslautern	2012–13	2. Bundesliga	14	3	0	0	—		2 (Note: Appearances in the 2. Bundesliga Promotion Playoff)	0	16	3
Fortuna Düsseldorf	2013–14	2. Bundesliga	24	9	0	0	—		—		24	9
Fortuna Düsseldorf	2014–15	2. Bundesliga	21	4	1	0	—		—		22	4
Fortuna Düsseldorf	Total		45	13	1	0	0	0	0	0	46	13
Karlsruher SC	2015–16	2. Bundesliga	27	4	1	0	—		—		28	4
Karlsruher SC	2016–17	2. Bundesliga	23	2	0	0	—		—		23	2
Karlsruher SC	Total		50	6	1	0	0	0	0	0	51	6
Beerschot Wilrijk	2017–18	First Division B	20	5	1	0	—		2 (Note: Appearances in the Belgian playoff for UEFA Europa League)	0	23	5
Beerschot Wilrijk	2018–19	First Division	20	3	2	1	—		5	0	27	4
Beerschot Wilrijk	Total		40	8	3	1	0	0	7	0	50	9
Admira Wacker Mödling	2019–20	Austrian Bundesliga	25	2	1	0	—		—		26	2
Admira Wacker Mödling	2020–21	Austrian Bundesliga	20	2	2	0	—		—		22	2
Admira Wacker Mödling	Total		45	4	3	0	0	0	0	0	48	4
Career total			369	97	19	5	6	2	9	0	405	104

=== International ===
Scores and results list Austria's goal tally first, score column indicates score after each Hoffer goal.

List of international goals scored by Erwin Hoffer
No.	Date	Venue	Opponent	Score	Result	Competition
1	1 April 2009	Wörthersee Stadion, Klagenfurt, Austria	Romania	1–1	2–1	2010 FIFA World Cup qualification
2	1 April 2009	Wörthersee Stadion, Klagenfurt, Austria	Romania	2–1	2–1	2010 FIFA World Cup qualification
3	7 September 2010	Red Bull Arena, Salzburg, Austria	Kazakhstan	2–0	2–0	UEFA Euro 2012 qualification
4	10 August 2011	Wörthersee Stadion, Klagenfurt, Austria	Slovakia	1–2	1–2	Friendly

== Honours ==
- Austrian Football Bundesliga: 2007–08
