= Tobias Steffen =

German footballer (born 1992)

Personal information
- Date of birth: 3 June 1992 (age 34)
- Place of birth: Leer, Germany
- Height: 1.75 m (5 ft 9 in)
- Position: Attacking midfielder

Team information
- Current team: Kickers Emden
- Number: 10

Youth career
- –2009: VfL Osnabrück
- 2009–2010: Bayer Leverkusen

Senior career*
Years	Team	Apps	(Gls)
2010–2013	Bayer Leverkusen II	68	(19)
2011–2012	→ Energie Cottbus II (loan)	6	(0)
2011–2012	→ Energie Cottbus (loan)	2	(0)
2013–2014	Fortuna Köln	29	(8)
2014–2015	Rot-Weiss Essen	23	(2)
2015	Schwarz-Weiß Rehden		
2016	BV Cloppenburg	14	(5)
2016–2020	SV Rödinghausen	67	(17)
2020	FC Preußen Espelkamp		
2020–2021	VfB Oldenburg	0	(0)
2021–2023	Atlas Delmenhorst	45	(4)
2023–	Kickers Emden	85	(33)
- * Club domestic league appearances and goals as of 20 June 2026

Tobias Steffen (born 3 June 1992) is a German footballer who plays as an attacking midfielder for Kickers Emden.

== Career ==
Steffen joined Bayer Leverkusen from VfL Osnabrück in 2009, and was promoted to the reserve team during the 2010–11 season. He made an immediate impact, scoring eight goals in fifteen games, and went on loan to Energie Cottbus of the 2. Bundesliga in July 2011. He made his Cottbus debut as a substitute for Dimitar Rangelov in a 2–0 away win over Alemannia Aachen in August 2008, but only made one other appearance and returned to Leverkusen half-way through the season. For the 2012–13 season he was named as an auxiliary member of the first-team squad, and was named in the starting eleven for a UEFA Europa League tie against Metalist Kharkiv in November 2012.

Steffen left Leverkusen in July 2013, signing for Fortuna Köln. He helped Fortuna win the Regionalliga West title in the 2013–14 season, and promotion to the 3. Liga after a playoff victory over Bayern Munich II before joining Rot-Weiss Essen in July 2014.
