= Stiven Rivić =

Croatian footballer (born 1985)

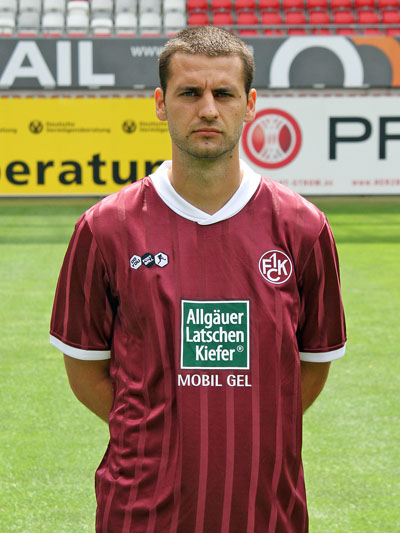
- Rivić in 1.FC Kaiserslautern colours in 2010

Personal information
- Date of birth: 9 August 1985 (age 41)
- Place of birth: Pula, SR Croatia, Yugoslavia
- Height: 1.81 m (5 ft 11 in)
- Position: Midfielder

Youth career
- 1991–2003: Pula
- 2003–2004: Schalke 04

Senior career*
Years	Team	Apps	(Gls)
2004–2005	Sint-Truiden	6	(0)
2005–2006	Pula	28	(12)
2006–2010	Energie Cottbus	73	(8)
2006–2007	Energie Cottbus II	12	(6)
2010–2011	1. FC Kaiserslautern	12	(2)
2012	Istra 1961	3	(0)
2012–2014	Energie Cottbus	40	(2)
2016–2017	Walton & Hersham	0	(0)
2017	Hampton & Richmond Borough	6	(2)
Total		180	(32)

International career
2003–2006	Croatia U21	7	(0)
- * Club domestic league appearances and goals

Stiven Rivić (born 9 August 1985) is a Croatian former professional footballer who played as a midfielder.

== Career ==
Born in Pula, Rivić started his career with the youth side of NK Pula. He moved around to a couple of clubs, before returning to NK Pula. Finally, he was signed by Energie Cottbus in 2006. Rivić was capped for the under-21 national team.

He scored his first Bundesliga goal on 6 May 2008 in his side's 1–1 draw against Karlsruher SC. In the next fixture against Hamburger SV, he scored again as his side gained a 2–0 victory. In next season he scored just one goal, and in the same season his club was relegated to 2. Bundesliga.

In July 2010, Rivić signed a three-year contract with 1. FC Kaiserslautern. The contract was dissolved prematurely in January 2012. Rivić then joined Prva HNL club Istra 1961 in February 2012.

On 6 August 2012, Rivić rejoined Cottbus on a two-year contract. He left the club at the end of the 2013–14 season after they had been relegated from the 2. Bundesliga.

On 24 March 2017, Rivic came back into football, joining Hampton & Richmond Borough in England's National League South, the sixth tier of football in the country.
