= Chadli Amri =

Algerian footballer (born 1984)

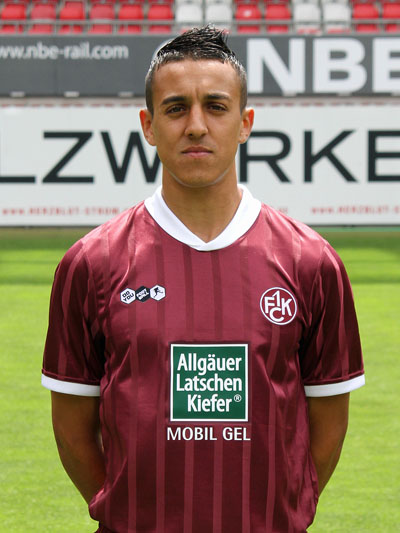
- Amri at 1. FC Kaiserslautern in 2010

Personal information
- Date of birth: 14 December 1984 (age 41)
- Place of birth: Saint-Avold, France
- Height: 1.78 m (5 ft 10 in)
- Position: Striker

Youth career
- 2000–2003: Metz
- 2003–2004: Lascasbas

Senior career*
Years	Team	Apps	(Gls)
2004–2006	1. FC Saarbrücken	25	(6)
2006–2010	Mainz 05	78	(7)
2010–2013	1. FC Kaiserslautern	6	(0)
2012	→ FSV Frankfurt (loan)	4	(1)
2013–2014	MC Oran	7	(0)
2014	SV Elversberg	0	(0)
2015–2017	FC Homburg	55	(3)
2017–2018	FC Differdange	19	(3)
2018–2020	Sarre-Union	34	(5)
2020–2021	Hombourg-Haut		

International career
2002	Algeria U20	1	(0)
2006–2010	Algeria	10	(0)

Managerial career
- 2020–2022: Progrès Niederkorn (assistant)
- * Club domestic league appearances and goals

Chadli Amri (Arabic: شادلي عامري; born 14 December 1984) is a retired professional footballer who played as a striker. Born in France, he represented Algeria at international level

== Early life ==
Amri was born in Saint-Avold, France, to Algerian parents. His family is originally from Laâchache, Tlemcen Province, Algeria.

== Career ==
After leaving FC Metz's junior ranks, he played briefly at amateur club ASC Lascasbas before joining the reserve team of 1. FC Saarbrücken. After one season with the reserve team, he was called up to the senior squad and scored six goals in 25 games. The next summer he signed a four-year contract with then 2. Bundesliga side 1. FSV Mainz 05. On 3 March 2010, his club announced that it would not renew the contract with the striker and that he would leave the club in summer. Amri then joined 1. FC Kaiserslautern.

On 15 December 2011, Amri was loaned out by Kaiserslautern to FSV Frankfurt until the end of the season. On 26 February 2012, in a league game against Karlsruher SC, Amri broke his leg after colliding with opposing goalkeeper Dirk Orlishausen, forcing him to miss the rest of the season.

== Coaching career ==
At the end of November 2020, Stéphane Léoni was appointed manager of Luxembourgian club FC Progrès Niederkorn, with Amri being announced as his assistant. After difficult second part of the 2021–22 season, the duo left the club at the end of the campaign, one year before their contracts expired.
