= 2010–11 Bundesliga =

48th season of the Bundesliga

Bundesliga
- Season: 2010–11
- Dates: 21 August 2010 – 15 May 2011
- Champions: Borussia Dortmund; 4th Bundesliga title 7th German title
- Relegated: Eintracht Frankfurt; FC St. Pauli
- Champions League: Borussia Dortmund; Bayer Leverkusen; Bayern Munich
- Europa League: Hannover 96; Mainz 05; Schalke 04 (via domestic cup)
- Matches: 306
- Goals: 894 (2.92 per match)
- Top goalscorer: Mario Gómez (28)
- Biggest home win: Stuttgart 7–0 M'gladbach
- Biggest away win: FC St. Pauli 1–8 Bayern
- Highest scoring: L'kusen 3–6 M'gladbach; FC St. Pauli 1–8 Bayern
- Average attendance: 42,101

The 2010–11 Bundesliga was the 48th season of the Bundesliga, Germany's premier football league. It began on 20 August 2010 and concluded on 14 May 2011. The winter break was in effect between weekends around 18 December 2010 and 15 January 2011. The defending champions were Bayern Munich. The league had also updated its logo for the season. The official match ball was Adidas Torfabrik 2010.

Borussia Dortmund earned its seventh league title with two games to spare on 30 April 2011, beating 1. FC Nürnberg 2–0 at home. FC St. Pauli and Eintracht Frankfurt were relegated to the 2011–12 2. Bundesliga.

== Teams ==
At the end of the 2009–10 season, VfL Bochum and Hertha BSC were directly relegated after finishing in the bottom two places of the league table. They were replaced by 1. FC Kaiserslautern, champions of the 2009–10 2. Bundesliga, and runners-up FC St. Pauli. Kaiserslautern returned to the Bundesliga after four years, and St. Pauli re-entered the top division after eight years.

A further place in the league was decided through a two-legged play-off. As in the previous year, 1. FC Nürnberg had to compete, although they were the Bundesliga team this time. FC Augsburg was the 2. Bundesliga's representative. Nuremberg won both matches on aggregate, 3–0, and thus defended their Bundesliga spot.

This was the first-ever season since reunification without any teams from either the former East Germany or West Berlin, since Hertha BSC was relegated.

=== Stadiums and locations ===
Several stadiums were undergoing long-term reconstruction work, among them Mercedes-Benz Arena, Millerntor-Stadion and Weserstadion. The capacities of EasyCredit-Stadion and Fritz-Walter-Stadion were also slightly increased during the off-season, while Hamburg's biggest arena was renamed Imtech Arena.

Locations of teams in the 2010–11 Fußball-Bundesliga

Team	Location	Stadium	Capacity	Average attendance
Bayer Leverkusen	Leverkusen	BayArena	30,210	28,627
Bayern Munich	Munich	Allianz Arena	69,000	69,000
Borussia Dortmund	Dortmund	Signal Iduna Park	80,552	79,250
Borussia Mönchengladbach	Mönchengladbach	Borussia-Park	54,057	45,676
Eintracht Frankfurt	Frankfurt	Commerzbank-Arena	51,500	47,336
SC Freiburg	Freiburg	Badenova-Stadion	24,000	23,047
Hamburger SV	Hamburg	Imtech Arena	57,000	54,445
Hannover 96	Hanover	AWD-Arena	49,000	43,948
1899 Hoffenheim	Sinsheim	Rhein-Neckar-Arena	30,150	29,858
1. FC Kaiserslautern	Kaiserslautern	Fritz-Walter-Stadion	49,780	46,378
1. FC Köln	Cologne	RheinEnergieStadion	50,000	47,752
Mainz 05	Mainz	Stadion am Bruchweg	20,300	20,170
1. FC Nürnberg	Nuremberg	EasyCredit-Stadion	48,548	42,019
Schalke 04	Gelsenkirchen	Veltins-Arena	61,673	61,248
FC St. Pauli	Hamburg	Millerntor-Stadion	24,487 ^{Note 1}	24,274
VfB Stuttgart	Stuttgart	Mercedes-Benz Arena	39,950 ^{Note 2}	38,847
Werder Bremen	Bremen	Weserstadion	42,100 ^{Note 3}	37,464
VfL Wolfsburg	Wolfsburg	Volkswagen Arena	30,000	28,909

Notes:

1. Millerntor-Stadion was undergroing reconstruction and expansion.
2. Mercedes-Benz Arena was converted to a football-only stadium during the 2009–10 and 2010–11 seasons. As a consequence, the usual capacity of 58,000 was reduced to 39,950 for the 2010–11 season.
3. Weserstadion was undergoing minor reconstruction during the season, with varying reduced capacities during that time.

=== Personnel and sponsorships ===
Team	Head coach	Team captain	Kitmaker	Shirt sponsor
Bayer Leverkusen	(Germany) Jupp Heynckes	(Germany) Simon Rolfes	Adidas	TelDaFax
Bayern Munich	(Netherlands) Andries Jonker (caretaker)	(Germany) Philipp Lahm	Adidas	T-Home
Borussia Dortmund	(Germany) Jürgen Klopp	(Germany) Sebastian Kehl	Kappa	Evonik
Borussia Mönchengladbach	(Switzerland) Lucien Favre	(Belgium) Filip Daems	Lotto	Postbank
Eintracht Frankfurt	(Germany) Christoph Daum	(Brazil) Chris	Jako	Fraport
SC Freiburg	(Germany) Robin Dutt	(Germany) Heiko Butscher	Nike	Ehrmann
Hamburger SV	(Germany) Michael Oenning	(Germany) Heiko Westermann	Adidas	Emirates
Hannover 96	(Germany) Mirko Slomka	(United States) Steve Cherundolo	Under Armour	TUI
1899 Hoffenheim	(Germany) Marco Pezzaiuoli	(Germany) Andreas Beck	Puma	TV Digital
1. FC Kaiserslautern	(Germany) Marco Kurz	(Croatia) Srđan Lakić	Do You Football	Allgäuer Latschenkiefer
1. FC Köln	(Germany) Volker Finke	(Germany) Lukas Podolski	Reebok	REWE
Mainz 05	(Germany) Thomas Tuchel	(North Macedonia) Nikolče Noveski	Nike	Entega
1. FC Nürnberg	(Germany) Dieter Hecking	(Germany) Andreas Wolf	Adidas	Areva
Schalke 04	(Germany) Ralf Rangnick	(Germany) Manuel Neuer	Adidas	Gazprom
FC St. Pauli	(Germany) Holger Stanislawski	(Germany) Fabio Morena	Do You Football	Ein Platz an der Sonne
VfB Stuttgart	(Germany) Bruno Labbadia	(France) Matthieu Delpierre	Puma	Gazi
Werder Bremen	(Germany) Thomas Schaaf	(Germany) Torsten Frings	Nike	Targobank
VfL Wolfsburg	(Germany) Felix Magath	(Germany) Marcel Schäfer	Adidas	Volkswagen

In addition, all matches featured one match ball as Adidas presented a new ball called "Jabulani Torfabrik" ("Goal Factory"). Previously, the home team was responsible for supplying the match ball. More often than not, it was provided by the kitmakers for the teams.

=== Managerial changes ===
Team	Outgoing manager	Manner of departure	Date of vacancy	Position in table	Replaced by	Date of appointment
VfL Wolfsburg	(Germany) Lorenz-Günther Köstner	End of tenure as caretaker	30 June 2010	Off-season	(England) Steve McClaren	1 July 2010
Hamburger SV	(Netherlands) Ricardo Moniz	End of tenure as caretaker	30 June 2010	Off-season	(Germany) Armin Veh	1 July 2010
VfB Stuttgart	(Switzerland) Christian Gross	Sacked	13 October 2010	18th	(Germany) Jens Keller	13 October 2010
1. FC Köln	(Croatia) Zvonimir Soldo	Sacked	24 October 2010	18th	(Germany) Frank Schaefer	24 October 2010
VfB Stuttgart	(Germany) Jens Keller	Sacked	11 December 2010	16th	(Germany) Bruno Labbadia	12 December 2010
1899 Hoffenheim	(Germany) Ralf Rangnick	Mutual consent	2 January 2011	8th	(Germany) Marco Pezzaiuoli	2 January 2011
VfL Wolfsburg	(England) Steve McClaren	Sacked	7 February 2011	12th	(Germany) Pierre Littbarski	7 February 2011
Borussia Mönchengladbach	(Germany) Michael Frontzeck	Sacked	13 February 2011	18th	(Switzerland) Lucien Favre	14 February 2011
Hamburger SV	(Germany) Armin Veh	Sacked	13 March 2011	8th	(Germany) Michael Oenning	13 March 2011
Schalke 04	(Germany) Felix Magath	Sacked	16 March 2011	10th	(Germany) Ralf Rangnick	17 March 2011
VfL Wolfsburg	(Germany) Pierre Littbarski	End of tenure as caretaker	18 March 2011	17th	(Germany) Felix Magath	18 March 2011
Eintracht Frankfurt	(Germany) Michael Skibbe	Sacked	22 March 2011	14th	(Germany) Christoph Daum	22 March 2011
Bayern Munich	(Netherlands) Louis van Gaal	Sacked	9 April 2011	4th	(Netherlands) Andries Jonker (caretaker)	9 April 2011
1. FC Köln	(Germany) Frank Schaefer	Resigned	27 April 2011	14th	(Germany) Volker Finke	27 April 2011

== League table ==
Pos	Team	Pld	W	D	L	GF	GA	GD	Pts	Qualification or relegation
1	Borussia Dortmund (C)	34	23	6	5	67	22	+45	75	Qualification to Champions League group stage
2	Bayer Leverkusen	34	20	8	6	64	44	+20	68	Qualification to Champions League group stage
3	Bayern Munich	34	19	8	7	81	40	+41	65	Qualification to Champions League play-off round
4	Hannover 96	34	19	3	12	49	45	+4	60	Qualification to Europa League play-off round
5	FSV Mainz 05	34	18	4	12	52	39	+13	58	Qualification to Europa League third qualifying round
6	1. FC Nürnberg	34	13	8	13	47	45	+2	47	
7	1. FC Kaiserslautern	34	13	7	14	48	51	−3	46	
8	Hamburger SV	34	12	9	13	46	52	−6	45	
9	SC Freiburg	34	13	5	16	41	50	−9	44	
10	1. FC Köln	34	13	5	16	47	62	−15	44	
11	1899 Hoffenheim	34	11	10	13	50	50	0	43	
12	VfB Stuttgart	34	12	6	16	60	59	+1	42	
13	Werder Bremen	34	10	11	13	47	61	−14	41	
14	Schalke 04	34	11	7	16	38	44	−6	40	Qualification to Europa League play-off round (Note: Schalke 04 as winners of the 2010–11 DFB-Pokal qualified for the play-off round of the 2011–12 UEFA Europa League.)
15	VfL Wolfsburg	34	9	11	14	43	48	−5	38	
16	Borussia Mönchengladbach (O)	34	10	6	18	48	65	−17	36	Qualification to relegation play-offs
17	Eintracht Frankfurt (R)	34	9	7	18	31	49	−18	34	Relegation to 2. Bundesliga
18	FC St. Pauli (R)	34	8	5	21	35	68	−33	29	Relegation to 2. Bundesliga

Source: kicker
Rules for classification: 1) points; 2) goal difference; 3) number of goals scored.
(C) Champions; (O) Play-off winners; (R) Relegated

== Results ==
Home \ Away	SVW	BVB	SGE	SCF	HSV	H96	TSG	FCK	KOE	B04	M05	BMG	FCB	FCN	S04	STP	VFB	WOB
Werder Bremen	—	2–0	0–0	2–1	3–2	1–1	2–1	1–2	4–2	2–2	0–2	1–1	1–3	2–3	1–1	3–0	1–1	0–1
Borussia Dortmund	2–0	—	3–1	3–0	2–0	4–1	1–1	5–0	1–0	0–2	1–1	4–1	2–0	2–0	0–0	2–0	1–1	2–0
Eintracht Frankfurt	1–1	1–0	—	0–1	1–3	0–3	0–4	0–0	0–2	0–3	2–1	0–1	1–1	2–0	0–0	2–1	0–2	3–1
SC Freiburg	1–3	1–2	0–0	—	1–0	1–3	3–2	2–1	3–2	0–1	1–0	3–0	1–2	1–1	1–2	1–3	2–1	2–1
Hamburger SV	4–0	1–1	1–0	0–2	—	0–0	2–1	2–1	6–2	2–4	2–4	1–1	0–0	1–1	2–1	0–1	4–2	1–3
Hannover 96	4–1	0–4	2–1	3–0	3–2	—	2–0	3–0	2–1	2–2	2–0	0–1	3–1	3–1	0–1	0–1	2–1	1–0
1899 Hoffenheim	4–1	1–0	1–0	0–1	0–0	4–0	—	3–2	1–1	2–2	1–2	3–2	1–2	1–1	2–0	2–2	1–2	1–3
1. FC Kaiserslautern	3–2	1–1	0–3	2–1	1–1	0–1	2–2	—	1–1	0–1	0–1	3–0	2–0	0–2	5–0	2–0	3–3	0–0
1. FC Köln	3–0	1–2	1–0	1–0	3–2	4–0	1–1	1–3	—	2–0	4–2	0–4	3–2	1–0	2–1	1–0	1–3	1–1
Bayer Leverkusen	2–2	1–3	2–1	2–2	1–1	2–0	2–1	3–1	3–2	—	0–1	3–6	1–1	0–0	2–0	2–1	4–2	3–0
Mainz 05	1–1	0–2	3–0	1–1	0–1	0–1	4–2	2–1	2–0	0–1	—	1–0	1–3	3–0	0–1	2–1	2–0	0–1
Borussia Mönchengladbach	1–4	1–0	0–4	2–0	1–2	1–2	2–0	0–1	5–1	1–3	2–3	—	3–3	1–1	2–1	1–2	2–3	1–1
Bayern Munich	0–0	1–3	4–1	4–2	6–0	3–0	4–0	5–1	0–0	5–1	1–2	1–0	—	3–0	4–1	3–0	2–1	2–1
1. FC Nürnberg	1–3	0–2	3–0	1–2	2–0	3–1	1–2	1–3	3–1	1–0	0–0	0–1	1–1	—	2–1	5–0	2–1	2–1
Schalke 04	4–0	1–3	2–1	1–0	0–1	1–2	0–1	0–1	3–0	0–1	1–3	2–2	2–0	1–1	—	3–0	2–2	1–0
FC St. Pauli	1–3	1–3	1–3	2–2	1–1	0–1	0–1	1–0	3–0	0–1	2–4	3–1	1–8	3–2	0–2 (Note: The FC St. Pauli v Schalke 04 match from 1 April 2011 was suspended after 87 minutes and a score of 0–2 due to an assistant referee being hit by a beverage cup thrown from the stands. The match was abandoned and later awarded on 5 April 2011 to Schalke 04 with a score of 0–2.)	—	1–2	1–1
VfB Stuttgart	6–0	1–3	1–2	0–1	3–0	2–1	1–1	2–4	0–1	1–4	1–0	7–0	3–5	1–4	1–0	2–0	—	1–1
VfL Wolfsburg	0–0	0–3	1–1	2–1	0–1	2–0	2–2	1–2	4–1	2–3	3–4	2–1	1–1	1–2	2–2	2–2	2–0	—

Source: DFB
Legend: Blue = home team win; Yellow = draw; Red = away team win.

== Promotion/relegation play-offs ==
Borussia Mönchengladbach as 16th-placed team faced 3rd-placed 2. Bundesliga side VfL Bochum in a two-legged play-off. The winner on aggregate score after both matches earned a spot in the 2011–12 Bundesliga.

19 May 2011
20:30 CEST

Borussia Mönchengladbach	1–0	VfL Bochum
De Camargo 90+3'	Report (in German)

Borussia-Park, Mönchengladbach
Attendance: 54,057
Referee: Günter Perl (Pullach)

25 May 2011
20:30 CEST

VfL Bochum	1–1	Borussia Mönchengladbach
Nordtveit 24' (o.g.)	Report (in German)	Reus 72'

rewirpowerSTADION, Bochum
Attendance: 28,650
Referee: Peter Gagelmann (Bremen)

Borussia Mönchengladbach won 2–1 on aggregate and retained its Fußball-Bundesliga spot for the 2011–12 season.

== Statistics ==
=== Top scorers ===
Source: bundesliga.de Archived 5 July 2011 at the Wayback Machine

Rank	Player	Club	Goals
1	(Germany) Mario Gómez	Bayern Munich	28
2	(Senegal) Papiss Cissé	SC Freiburg	22
3	(Slovenia) Milivoje Novaković	1. FC Köln	17
4	(Paraguay) Lucas Barrios	Borussia Dortmund	16
4	(Greece) Theofanis Gekas	Eintracht Frankfurt	16
4	(Croatia) Srđan Lakić	1. FC Kaiserslautern	16
7	(Germany) André Schürrle	Mainz 05	15
8	(Ivory Coast) Didier Ya Konan	Hannover 96	14
9	(Germany) Lukas Podolski	1. FC Köln	13
9	(Spain) Raúl	Schalke 04	13

== Attendances ==
No.	Team	Matches	Total	Average
1	Borussia Dortmund	17	1,345,560	79,151
2	Bayern München	17	1,173,000	69,000
3	Schalke 04	17	1,042,446	61,320
4	Hamburger SV	17	925,579	54,446
5	1. FC Köln	17	812,300	47,782
6	Eintracht Frankfurt	17	805,200	47,365
7	1. FC Kaiserslautern	17	788,665	46,392
8	Borussia Mönchengladbach	17	768,207	45,189
9	Hannover 96	17	746,345	43,903
10	1. FC Nürnberg	17	714,337	42,020
11	VfB Stuttgart	17	659,400	38,788
12	Werder Bremen	17	639,532	37,620
13	1899 Hoffenheim	17	507,800	29,871
14	VfL Wolfsburg	17	491,079	28,887
15	Bayer Leverkusen	17	486,764	28,633
16	FC St. Pauli	17	413,346	24,314
17	SC Freiburg	17	392,300	23,076
18	Mainz 05	17	343,100	20,182
