= Uwe Möhrle =

German footballer

Personal information
- Date of birth: 3 December 1979 (age 46)
- Place of birth: Überlingen, West Germany
- Height: 1.89 m (6 ft 2 in)
- Position: Defender

Youth career
- 1985–1986: SV Großschönach
- 1986–1999: SC Pfullendorf

Senior career*
Years	Team	Apps	(Gls)
1999–2002	SC Pfullendorf	44	(1)
2002–2005	Hansa Rostock	60	(2)
2002–2004	Hansa Rostock II	38	(2)
2005–2006	MSV Duisburg	31	(4)
2006–2007	VfL Wolfsburg	23	(0)
2007–2012	FC Augsburg	130	(8)
2012–2016	Energie Cotbus	150	(13)
Total		476	(30)

International career
2004	Germany B	1	(0)
- * Club domestic league appearances and goals

Uwe Möhrle (born 3 December 1979) is a German former professional footballer who played as a defender.
