= Marco Pezzaiuoli =

Italian footballer and manager

Personal information
- Date of birth: 16 November 1968 (age 57)
- Place of birth: Mannheim, West Germany

Senior career*
Years	Team	Apps	(Gls)
- 98 Schwetzingen
- VfR Mannheim

Managerial career
- 2002: Karlsruher SC (caretaker)
- 2006: Eintracht Trier
- 2007–2008: Germany U16
- 2008–2009: Germany U17
- 2009–2010: Germany U15
- 2009–2010: Germany U18
- 2011: TSG Hoffenheim
- 2014: Cerezo Osaka
- 2016: Zhuhai Suoka
- 2021–2022: Bengaluru
- * Club domestic league appearances and goals

Marco Pezzaiuoli (born 16 November 1968) is a German professional football manager who is the technical director of PVF Football Academy.

== Coaching career ==
=== Karlsruher SC ===
Pezzaiuoli had two stints as interim head coach of Karlsruher SC. The first stint happened after Joachim Löw resigned on 20 April 2000. Stefan Kuntz eventually took over the next season. Pezzaiuoli's second stint as interim head coach happened after Kunz was sacked on 25 September 2002. Lorenz-Günther Köstner was hired on 1 October 2002. He went to coach different teams with in the German Football Association and was an assistant coach for Suwon Samsung Bluewings in South Korea after leaving Karlsruhe.

=== Eintracht Trier ===
Pezzaiuoli was hired by Oberliga outfit Eintracht Trier on 20 September 2006 and given a contract to the end of the season. Pezzaiuoli lost his first match in charge 6–5 to EGC Wirges. Pezzaiuoli was sacked after five matches on 30 October 2006; losing three matches. His final match was a 2–1 loss to Eintracht Bad Kreuznach.

=== TSG Hoffenheim ===
On 2 January 2011, Pezzaiuoli became new head coach of TSG Hoffenheim. The club announced on 12 April 2011 that he would leave at the end of the season, recently having won only one out of eight games. Holger Stanislawski replaced Pezzaiuoli on 17 May 2011; three days after his final match.

=== Cerezo Osaka ===
On 16 June 2014, Cerezo Osaka named Pezzaiuoli as their head coach replacing Ranko Popović, but he was relieved of his duties on 8 September after failing to register a single win in the J. League. His team did manage a Japanese Emperor's Cup win against Kataller Toyama by 1–0 and a second leg quarter-final win away at Kawasaki Frontale in the J. League Cup. His team lost that tie on aggregate and, as had been rumoured for more than a week Pezzaiuoli was on his way home.

=== Bengaluru FC ===
On 12 February 2021, Pezzaiuoli was appointed as the head coach of Indian Super League club Bengaluru FC on a three-year performance-based contract.

The first game (unofficial) of Pezzaiuoli with Bengaluru was against FC Goa on 7 April 2021. Cleiton Silva's strike ensured of first win for Pezzaiuoli at Bengaluru FC. His first official game was against Nepal Army Club at 2021 AFC Cup preliminary round 1 against whom they won by 5–0 margin.

On 8 June 2022, Bengaluru FC announced the departure of Pezzaiuoli.

=== PVF ===
On 5 May 2026, Pezzaiuoli was named as the technical director of the PVF Football Academy in Vietnam.

== Managerial statistics ==
As of match played 10 January 2022

Team	From	To	Record					
Team	From	To	G	W	D	L	Win %	Ref.
Karlsruher SC	20 April 2000	30 June 2000	7	2	2	3	28.57	
Karlsruher SC	25 September 2002	1 October 2002	1	0	1	0	0.00	
Eintracht Trier	20 September 2006	30 October 2006	5	2	0	3	40.00	
TSG Hoffenheim	2 January 2011	17 May 2011	18	5	3	10	27.78	
Cerezo Osaka	16 June 2014	8 September 2014	9	0	4	5	0.00	
Bengaluru	12 February 2021	8 June 2022	19	7	5	7	36.84	
Total			59	17	16	26	28.81	—
