= 2008–09 1. FC Köln season =

1. FC Köln
2008–09 season
- Manager: Christoph Daum
- Stadium: RheinEnergieStadion
- Bundesliga: 12th
- DFB-Pokal: Second Round

The 2008–09 1. FC Köln season was the 60th season in club history.

== Squad ==
Note: Flags indicate national team as defined under FIFA eligibility rules; some limited exceptions apply. Players may hold more than one non-FIFA nationality.

No.	Pos.	Nation	Player
1	GK	COL	Faryd Mondragón
2	DF	SLO	Mišo Brečko
3	DF	LBN	Youssef Mohamad
4	DF	CMR	Marvin Matip
5	DF	TUR	Ümit Özat
6	DF	CMR	Pierre Womé
7	MF	SRB	Nemanja Vučićević
8	FW	GER	Matthias Scherz
9	FW	NGR	Manasseh Ishiaku
10	MF	GER	Thomas Broich
11	FW	SLO	Milivoje Novaković (captain)
12	MF	POR	Petit
13	DF	GER	Daniel Brosinski
14	MF	BFA	Wilfried Sanou
17	DF	GER	Kevin Pezzoni
18	GK	GER	Thomas Kessler

No.	Pos.	Nation	Player
19	MF	MAR	Adil Chihi
21	DF	BRA	Pedro Geromel
22	DF	FRA	Fabrice Ehret
23	DF	CAN	Kevin McKenna
24	FW	ROU	Sergiu Radu
26	MF	GHA	Derek Boateng
28	DF	GER	Carsten Cullmann
29	MF	GER	Taner Yalçın
30	MF	GER	Michael Gardawski
33	MF	GER	Michael Niedrig
34	GK	CRO	Miro Varvodić
40	FW	GER	Moritz Hartmann
45	MF	POL	Adam Matuszczyk
—	MF	LBN	Roda Antar
—	DF	GER	Tobias Nickenig
—	MF	GER	Kevin Schöneberg

== Competitions ==
=== Overview ===
Competition	First match	Last match	Starting round	Final position	Record							
Competition	First match	Last match	Starting round	Final position	Pld	W	D	L	GF	GA	GD	Win %
Bundesliga	16 August 2008	23 May 2009	Matchday 1	12th	34	11	6	17	35	50	−15	32.35
DFB-Pokal	18 August 2008	23 September 2008	First round	Second round	2	1	0	1	6	2	+4	50.00
Total					36	12	6	18	41	52	−11	33.33

Source: Competitions

=== Bundesliga ===
==== League table ====
Pos	Team	Pld	W	D	L	GF	GA	GD	Pts	Qualification or relegation
1	VfL Wolfsburg (C)	34	21	6	7	80	41	+39	69	Qualification to Champions League group stage
2	Bayern Munich	34	20	7	7	71	42	+29	67	Qualification to Champions League group stage
3	VfB Stuttgart	34	19	7	8	63	43	+20	64	Qualification to Champions League play-off round
4	Hertha BSC	34	19	6	9	48	41	+7	63	Qualification to Europa League play-off round
5	Hamburger SV	34	19	4	11	49	47	+2	61	Qualification to Europa League third qualifying round
6	Borussia Dortmund	34	15	14	5	60	37	+23	59	
7	1899 Hoffenheim	34	15	10	9	63	49	+14	55	
8	Schalke 04	34	14	8	12	47	35	+12	50	
9	Bayer Leverkusen	34	14	7	13	59	46	+13	49	
10	Werder Bremen (Note: Werder Bremen qualified for the play-off round of the UEFA Europa League by winning the 2008–09 DFB-Pokal.)	34	12	9	13	64	50	+14	45	Qualification to Europa League play-off round
11	Hannover 96	34	10	10	14	49	69	−20	40	
12	1. FC Köln	34	11	6	17	35	50	−15	39	
13	Eintracht Frankfurt	34	8	9	17	39	60	−21	33	
14	VfL Bochum	34	7	11	16	39	55	−16	32	
15	Borussia Mönchengladbach	34	8	7	19	39	62	−23	31	
16	Energie Cottbus (R)	34	8	6	20	30	57	−27	30	Qualification to relegation play-offs
17	Karlsruher SC (R)	34	8	5	21	30	54	−24	29	Relegation to 2. Bundesliga
18	Arminia Bielefeld (R)	34	4	16	14	29	56	−27	28	Relegation to 2. Bundesliga

Source: kicker (in German)
Rules for classification: 1) points; 2) goal difference; 3) number of goals scored.
(C) Champions; (R) Relegated

==== Matches ====
16 August 2008 1	VfL Wolfsburg	2–1	1. FC Köln	Wolfsburg
15:30	48' Christian Gentner; 78' Zvjezdan Misimović		20' Milivoje Novaković	Stadium: Volkswagen Arena; Attendance: 29,058; Referee: Felix Brych

24 August 2008 2	1. FC Köln	1–1	Eintracht Frankfurt	Cologne
15:30	33' Milivoje Novaković		81' Martin Fenin	Stadium: RheinEnergieStadion; Attendance: 50,997; Referee: Manuel Gräfe

29 August 2008 3	Karlsruher SC	0–2	1. FC Köln	Karlsruhe
15:30			72' Milivoje Novaković; 84' Sergiu Radu	Stadium: Wildparkstadion; Attendance: 29,308; Referee: Florian Meyer

13 September 2008 4	1. FC Köln	0–3	Bayern Munich	Cologne
15:30			53' Luca Toni; 60' Luca Toni; 90' Lukas Podolski	Stadium: RheinEnergieStadion; Attendance: 50,997; Referee: Michael Weiner

20 September 2008 5	Arminia Bielefeld	2–0	1. FC Köln	Bielefeld
15:30	74' Jonas Kamper; 77' Artur Wichniarek			Stadium: Bielefelder Alm; Attendance: 24,400; Referee: Michael Kempter

26 September 2008 6	1. FC Köln	1–0	FC Schalke 04	Cologne
15:30	43' Youssef Mohamad			Stadium: RheinEnergieStadion; Attendance: 50,997; Referee: Florian Meyer

4 October 2008 7	Borussia Mönchengladbach	1–2	1. FC Köln	Mönchengladbach
15:30	10' Roel Brouwers		5' Fabrice Ehret; 88' Milivoje Novaković	Stadium: Borussia-Park; Attendance: 54,067; Referee: Günter Perl

18 October 2008 8	1. FC Köln	1–0	Energie Cottbus	Cologne
15:30	39' Milivoje Novaković			Stadium: RheinEnergieStadion; Attendance: 49,000; Referee: Felix Brych

24 October 2008 9	Bayer Leverkusen	2–0	1. FC Köln	Leverkusen
15:30	67' Manuel Friedrich; 84' Theofanis Gekas (P)			Stadium: BayArena; Attendance: 22,500; Referee: Michael Weiner

29 October 2008 10	1. FC Köln	0–1	Borussia Dortmund	Cologne
15:30			65' Florian Kringe	Stadium: RheinEnergieStadion; Attendance: 50,997; Referee: Helmut Fleischer

1 November 2008 11	VfB Stuttgart	1–3	1. FC Köln	Stuttgart
15:30	69' Roberto Hilbert		3' Milivoje Novaković; 61' Milivoje Novaković; 90' Petit	Stadium: Mercedes-Benz Arena; Attendance: 55,000; Referee: Thorsten Kinhöfer

7 November 2008 12	1. FC Köln	2–1	Hannover 96	Cologne
15:30	42' Pedro Geromel; 71' Wilfried Sanou		16' Jan Schlaudraff	Stadium: RheinEnergieStadion; Attendance: 49,000; Referee: Peter Sippel

16 November 2008 13	Werder Bremen	3–1	1. FC Köln	Bremen
15:30	15' Diego; 45' Naldo; 55' Hugo Almeida		48' Milivoje Novaković	Stadium: Weserstadion; Attendance: 42,100; Referee: Markus Schmidt

22 November 2008 14	1. FC Köln	1–3	1899 Hoffenheim	Cologne
15:30	78' Petit		32' Demba Ba; 67' Vedad Ibišević; 88' Vedad Ibišević	Stadium: RheinEnergieStadion; Attendance: 50,997; Referee: Deniz Aytekin

28 November 2008 15	Hertha BSC	2–1	1. FC Köln	Berlin
15:30	24' Gojko Kačar; 86' Marko Pantelić		45' Milivoje Novaković	Stadium: Olympiastadion; Attendance: 40,704; Referee: Lutz Wagner

7 December 2008 16	1. FC Köln	1–2	Hamburger SV	Cologne
15:30	83' Milivoje Novaković		15' Mladen Petrić; 31' Mladen Petrić	Stadium: RheinEnergieStadion; Attendance: 50,997; Referee: Manuel Gräfe

13 December 2008 17	VfL Bochum	1–2	1. FC Köln	Bochum
15:30	58' Christoph Dabrowski		44' Kevin McKenna; 87' Manasseh Ishiaku	Stadium: rewirpowerSTADION; Attendance: 30,512; Referee: Jochen Drees

31 January 2009 18	1. FC Köln	1–1	VfL Wolfsburg	Cologne
15:30	34' Sergiu Radu		73' Grafite	Stadium: RheinEnergieStadion; Attendance: 50,997; Referee: Peter Gagelmann

7 February 2009 19	Eintracht Frankfurt	2–2	1. FC Köln	Frankfurt am Main
15:30	33' Marco Russ; 62' Martin Fenin		57' Milivoje Novaković; 74' Milivoje Novaković (P)	Stadium: Commerzbank-Arena; Attendance: 51,300; Referee: Guido Winkmann

14 February 2009 20	1. FC Köln	0–0	Karlsruher SC	Cologne
15:30				Stadium: RheinEnergieStadion; Attendance: 48,000; Referee: Jochen Drees

21 February 2009 21	Bayern Munich	1–2	1. FC Köln	Munich
15:30	84' Daniel Van Buyten		22' Fabrice Ehret; 34' Daniel Brosinski	Stadium: Olympiastadion; Attendance: 69,000; Referee: Babak Rafati

27 February 2009 22	1. FC Köln	1–1	Arminia Bielefeld	Cologne
15:30	15' Petit		43' Christopher Katongo	Stadium: RheinEnergieStadion; Attendance: 47,500; Referee: Peter Sippel

6 March 2009 23	FC Schalke 04	1–0	1. FC Köln	Gelsenkirchen
15:30	28' Jermaine Jones			Stadium: Veltins-Arena; Attendance: 61,673; Referee: Günter Perl

14 March 2009 24	1. FC Köln	2–4	Borussia Mönchengladbach	Cologne
15:30	64' Mišo Brečko; 82' Mišo Brečko		25' Michael Bradley; 44' Karim Matmour; 67' Rob Friend; 87' Michael Bradley (P)	Stadium: RheinEnergieStadion; Attendance: 50,000; Referee: Thorsten Kinhöfer

21 March 2009 25	Energie Cottbus	0–2	1. FC Köln	Cottbus
15:30			51' Milivoje Novaković; 56' Milivoje Novaković (P)	Stadium: Stadion der Freundschaft; Attendance: 15,650; Referee: Felix Brych

5 April 2009 26	1. FC Köln	0–2	Bayer Leverkusen	Cologne
15:30			66' Stefan Kießling; 76' Patrick Helmes (P)	Stadium: RheinEnergieStadion; Attendance: 49,800; Referee: Peter Sippel

11 April 2009 27	Borussia Dortmund	3–1	1. FC Köln	Dortmund
15:30	29' Neven Subotić; 49' Tamás Hajnal; 81' Pedro Geromel (OG)		10' Nemanja Vučićević	Stadium: Westfalenstadion; Attendance: 80,552; Referee: Günter Perl

18 April 2009 28	1. FC Köln	0–3	VfB Stuttgart	Cologne
15:30			16' Mario Gómez; 55' Mario Gómez; 71' Mario Gómez	Stadium: RheinEnergieStadion; Attendance: 50,997; Referee: Peter Gagelmann

25 April 2009 29	Hannover 96	2–1	1. FC Köln	Hanover
15:30	19' Leon Andreasen; 32' Leon Andreasen		47' Milivoje Novaković	Stadium: AWD-Arena; Attendance: 47,208; Referee: Lutz Wagner

3 May 2009 30	1. FC Köln	1–0	Werder Bremen	Cologne
15:30	61' Milivoje Novaković			Stadium: RheinEnergieStadion; Attendance: 50,000; Referee: Michael Weiner

9 May 2009 31	1899 Hoffenheim	2–0	1. FC Köln	Sinsheim
15:30	58' Sejad Salihović; 68' Demba Ba			Stadium: Rhein-Neckar-Arena; Attendance: 30,150; Referee: Michael Kempter

12 May 2009 32	1. FC Köln	1–2	Hertha BSC	Cologne
15:30	90' Adil Chihi		42' Cícero Santos; 53' Patrick Ebert	Stadium: RheinEnergieStadion; Attendance: 48,000; Referee: Knut Kircher

16 May 2009 33	Hamburger SV	0–1	1. FC Köln	Hamburg
15:30			9' Fabrice Ehret	Stadium: HSH Nordbank Arena; Attendance: 57,000; Referee: Babak Rafati

23 May 2009 34	1. FC Köln	1–1	VfL Bochum	Cologne
15:30	24' Antar Yahia (OG)		18' Diego Klimowicz	Stadium: RheinEnergieStadion; Attendance: 50,997; Referee: Peter Gagelmann

=== DFB-Pokal ===
8 August 2008 First round	SVN Zweibrücken	1–5	1. FC Köln	Pirmasens
0:00	27' Simon		15' Roda Antar; 22' Petit; 43' Paulus (OG); 71' Milivoje Novaković; 79' Matthias Scherz	Stadium: Sportpark Husterhöhe; Attendance: 8,000; Referee: Markus Schmidt

23 September 2008 Second round	1. FSV Mainz 05	3–1	1. FC Köln	Mainz
19:00	61' Aristide Bancé; 68' Miroslav Karhan (P); 79' Milorad Peković		73' Youssef Mohamad	Stadium: Mewa Arena; Attendance: 19,300; Referee: Herbert Fandel

== Statistics ==
=== Squad statistics ===
No.	Pos	Nat	Player	Total		Bundesliga		DFB-Pokal	
No.	Pos	Nat	Player	Apps	Goals	Apps	Goals	Apps	Goals
1	GK	(Colombia) COL	Faryd Mondragón	33	0	31	0	2	0
18	GK	(Germany) GER	Thomas Kessler	3	0	3	0	0	0
34	GK	(Croatia) CRO	Miro Varvodić	0	0	0	0	0	0
21	DF	(Brazil) BRA	Pedro Geromel	34	1	32	1	2	0
3	DF	(Lebanon) LBN	Youssef Mohamad	32	2	30	1	2	1
23	DF	(Canada) CAN	Kevin McKenna	26	1	24	1	2	0
17	DF	(Germany) GER	Kevin Pezzoni	27	0	27	0	0	0
4	DF	(Cameroon) CMR	Marvin Matip	18	0	18	0	0	0
	DF	(Germany) GER	Tobias Nickenig	1	0	1	0	0	0
28	DF	(Germany) GER	Carsten Cullmann	0	0	0	0	0	0
6	DF	(Cameroon) CMR	Pierre Womé	20	0	18	0	2	0
22	DF	(France) FRA	Fabrice Ehret	25	3	25	3	0	0
5	DF	(Turkey) TUR	Ümit Özat	4	0	3	0	1	0
2	DF	(Slovenia) SLO	Mišo Brečko	35	2	33	2	2	0
13	DF	(Germany) GER	Daniel Brosinski	10	1	10	1	0	0
12	MF	(Portugal) POR	Petit	33	4	31	3	2	1
26	MF	(Ghana) GHA	Derek Boateng	10	0	10	0	0	0
	MF	(Lebanon) LBN	Roda Antar	17	1	15	0	2	1
	MF	(Germany) GER	Kevin Schöneberg	0	0	0	0	0	0
29	MF	(Germany) GER	Taner Yalçın	12	0	12	0	0	0
45	MF	(Poland) POL	Adam Matuszczyk	0	0	0	0	0	0
33	MF	(Germany) GER	Michael Niedrig	0	0	0	0	0	0
30	MF	(Germany) GER	Michael Gardawski	0	0	0	0	0	0
10	MF	(Germany) GER	Thomas Broich	13	0	12	0	1	0
7	MF	(Serbia) SRB	Nemanja Vučićević	30	1	29	1	1	0
14	MF	(Burkina Faso) BFA	Wilfried Sanou	16	1	15	1	1	0
19	MF	(Morocco) MAR	Adil Chihi	21	1	19	1	2	0
11	FW	(Slovenia) SLO	Milivoje Novaković	32	17	30	16	2	1
9	FW	(Nigeria) NGR	Manasseh Ishiaku	13	0	13	0	0	0
24	FW	(Romania) ROU	Sergiu Radu	23	2	22	2	1	0
8	FW	(Germany) GER	Matthias Scherz	7	1	6	0	1	1
40	FW	(Germany) GER	Moritz Hartmann	0	0	0	0	0	0
