= 2009–10 Hamburger SV season =

Hamburger SV
2009–10 season
- Manager: Bruno Labbadia (until 26 April); Ricardo Moniz (interim)
- Stadium: HSH Nordbank Arena
- Bundesliga: 7th
- DFB-Pokal: Second round
- UEFA Europa League: Semi-finals
- Top goalscorer: League: Mladen Petrić (8); All: Mladen Petrić (20)
- Average home league attendance: 55,242
Home colours	Away colours	Third colours

During the 2009–10 German football season, Hamburger SV competed in the Bundesliga.

== Season summary ==
Hamburg reached the Europa League semi-final for the second season running, but were eliminated by Fulham (thus missing out on the chance to play the final at their home ground). However, a seventh-placed finish in the final table meant that the club would not be competing in Europe for the first time in 7 years. Manager Bruno Labbadia paid for the poor form with his job in late April, with technical coach Ricardo Moniz taking charge for the final two games. Armin Veh was appointed permanent manager in May.

== First-team squad ==
Squad at end of season

Note: Flags indicate national team as defined under FIFA eligibility rules; some limited exceptions apply. Players may hold more than one non-FIFA nationality.

No.	Pos.	Nation	Player
1	GK	GER	Frank Rost
3	DF	CZE	David Rozehnal
4	DF	GER	Bastian Reinhardt
5	DF	NED	Joris Mathijsen
6	DF	GER	Dennis Aogo
7	DF	GER	Marcell Jansen
8	DF	BRA	Zé Roberto
9	FW	PER	Paolo Guerrero
10	FW	CRO	Mladen Petrić (Note: Petrić was born in Brčko, Yugoslavia (now Bosnia and Herzegovina), but was raised in Switzerland and also qualified to represent Croatia internationally and represented Switzerland at U-17 and U-21 level before making his international debut for Croatia in November 2001.)
11	MF	NED	Eljero Elia
12	GK	GER	Wolfgang Hesl
13	MF	GER	Robert Tesche
14	MF	CZE	David Jarolím (captain)
15	MF	GER	Piotr Trochowski (Note: Trochowski was born in Tczew, Poland, but was raised in Germany from the age of 5 and made his international debut for Germany in October 2002.)
16	FW	SWE	Marcus Berg
17	DF	GER	Jérôme Boateng

No.	Pos.	Nation	Player
18	MF	NED	Romeo Castelen (Note: Castelen was born in Paramaribo, Suriname, but also qualified to represent the Netherlands internationally and made his international debut for the Netherlands in August 2004.)
19	MF	TUR	Tolgay Arslan (Note: Arslan was born in Paderborn, Germany, and represented Germany at U-20 and U-21 level, but also qualified to represent Turkey internationally and represented Turkey at U-19 and U-21 level.)
20	DF	CIV	Guy Demel (Note: Demel was born in Orsay, France, but also qualified to represent the Ivory Coast internationally and made his international debut for the Ivory Coast in 2004.)
21	MF	BFA	Jonathan Pitroipa
22	FW	NED	Ruud van Nistelrooy
24	MF	GER	Christian Groß
25	MF	VEN	Tomás Rincón
27	MF	GER	Sören Bertram
29	GK	GER	Tom Mickel
30	MF	NAM	Collin Benjamin
31	FW	GER	Maximilian Beister
32	DF	GER	Henrik Dettman
33	DF	CZE	Miroslav Štěpánek
34	DF	GER	Kai-Fabian Schulz
35	FW	TUR	Tunay Torun (Note: Torun was born in Hamburg, West Germany (now Germany), but also qualified to represent Turkey internationally and represented Turkey at U-15, U-16, U-17, U-18, U-21 and B level before making his international debut for Turkey in February 2011.)
36	MF	GER	Hanno Behrens

=== Left club during season ===
Note: Flags indicate national team as defined under FIFA eligibility rules; some limited exceptions apply. Players may hold more than one non-FIFA nationality.

No.	Pos.	Nation	Player
2	DF	BRA	Alex Silva (on loan to São Paulo)
22	FW	CMR	Eric Maxim Choupo-Moting (Note: Choupo-Moting was born in Hamburg, West Germany (now Germany), and represented Germany at U-19 and U-21 level, but also qualified to represent Cameroon internationally through his father and made his international debut for Cameroon in June 2010.) (on loan to Nürnberg)

No.	Pos.	Nation	Player
28	MF	SEN	Mickaël Tavares (Note: Tavares was born in Villeneuve-Saint-Georges, France, but also qualified to represent Cape Verde and Senegal internationally through his mother and father respectively and was called up by Cape Verde in May 2008 before making his international debut for Senegal in 2009.) (on loan to Nürnberg)
32	MF	GER	Änis Ben-Hatira (Note: Ben-Hatira was born in West Berlin, West Germany (now Berlin, Germany), and represented Germany at U-19, U-20, and U-21 level, but also qualified to represent Tunisia internationally and made his international debut for Tunisia in February 2012.) (to MSV Duisburg)

== Competitions ==
=== Bundesliga ===
==== League table ====
Pos	Team	Pld	W	D	L	GF	GA	GD	Pts	Qualification or relegation
5	Borussia Dortmund	34	16	9	9	54	42	+12	57	Qualification to Europa League play-off round
6	VfB Stuttgart	34	15	10	9	51	41	+10	55	Qualification to Europa League third qualifying round (Note: Since both finalists of the 2009–10 DFB-Pokal were qualified for the 2010–11 UEFA Champions League, the 6th-placed team will qualify for the 3rd qualifying round of the 2010–11 UEFA Europa League.)
7	Hamburger SV	34	13	13	8	56	41	+15	52	
8	VfL Wolfsburg	34	14	8	12	64	58	+6	50	
9	Mainz 05	34	12	11	11	36	42	−6	47	

Source: kicker.de (in German)
Rules for classification: 1) points; 2) goal difference; 3) number of goals scored.

==== Results summary ====
Overall								Home						Away					
Pld	W	D	L	GF	GA	GD	Pts	W	D	L	GF	GA	GD	W	D	L	GF	GA	GD
34	13	13	8	56	41	+15	52	8	6	3	25	12	+13	5	7	5	31	29	+2

Source: Soccerway

==== Matches ====
9 August 2009 1	SC Freiburg	1–1	Hamburger SV	Freiburg
17:30 CEST (UTC+2)	Krmaš (yellow card) 8'; Bechmann 65', (yellow card) 76'	Report	Pitroipa 3'; Aogo (yellow card) 15'	Stadium: Badenova-Stadion; Referee: Peter Sippel; Assistant referees: Tobias Christ, Walter Hofmann; Fourth official: Torsten Bauer

15 August 2009 2	Hamburger SV	4–1	Borussia Dortmund	Hamburg
15:30 CEST (UTC+2)	Demel 3'; Zé Roberto 10'; Guerrero 12'; Berg 72'	Report	Valdez 4'; Hajnal (yellow card) 31'	Stadium: HSH Nordbank Arena; Referee: Michael Kempter; Assistant referees: Mark Borsch, Tobias Welz; Fourth official: Carsten Kadach

23 August 2009 3	VfL Wolfsburg	2–4	Hamburger SV	Wolfsburg
17:30 CEST (UTC+2)	Josué (yellow card) 35'; Misimović (yellow card) 43', (goal) 52'; Martins 55'; Gentner (yellow card) 74'; Grafite (yellow card) 77'	Report	Guerrero 3'; Elia 7'; Mathijsen (yellow card) 20'; Boateng (yellow card) 34'; Petrić 75'; Castelen 90'	Stadium: Volkswagen Arena; Referee: Knut Kircher; Assistant referees: Robert Kempter, Stefan Lupp; Fourth official: Bastian Dankert

30 August 2009 4	Hamburger SV	3–1	1. FC Köln	Hamburg
17:30 CEST (UTC+2)	Guerrero 19', 66'; Trochowski 86' (pen.)	Report	Chihi 75'; Mohamad (yellow card) 77'; Mondragón (yellow card) 85'	Stadium: HSH Nordbank Arena; Referee: Felix Brych; Assistant referees: Marco Achmüller, Robert Hartmann; Fourth official: Florian Steuer

12 September 2009 5	Hamburger SV	3–1	VfB Stuttgart	Hamburg
18:30 CEST (UTC+2)	Petrić 30'; Elia 58', (yellow card) 72'; Zé Roberto 90+1'	Report	Tasci (yellow card) 32'; Pogrebnyak 62'; Lehmann (yellow card) 70'; Magnin (yellow card) 79'	Stadium: HSH Nordbank Arena; Referee: Wolfgang Stark; Assistant referees: Mike Pickel, Thorsten Schiffner; Fourth official: Georg Schalk

20 September 2009 6	Eintracht Frankfurt	1–1	Hamburger SV	Frankfurt
15:30 CEST (UTC+2)	Russ 32'; Franz (yellow card) 84'	Report	Zé Roberto 8', (yellow card) 71'	Stadium: Commerzbank-Arena; Referee: Thorsten Kinnhöfer; Assistant referees: Christian Fischer, Detlef Scheppe; Fourth official: Kai Voss

26 September 2009 7	Hamburger SV	1–0	Bayern Munich	Hamburg
18:30 CEST (UTC+2)	Zé Roberto (yellow card) 41'; Aogo (yellow card) 69'; Petrić 72'	Report	Ribéry (yellow card) 40'; Tymoshchuk (yellow card) 59'; Schweinsteiger (yellow card) 78'	Stadium: HSH Nordbank Arena; Referee: Michael Weiner; Assistant referees: Thomas Frank, Sönke Glindemann; Fourth official: Christian Bandurski

4 October 2009 8	Hertha BSC	1–3	Hamburger SV	Berlin
17:30 CEST (UTC+2)	Friedrich 9', (yellow card) 13'; Ebert (yellow card) 75'	Report	Kaká 23' (o.g.); Jarolím 38'; Zé Roberto 40'	Stadium: Olympiastadion; Referee: Günter Perl; Assistant referees: Josef Maier, Georg Schalk; Fourth official: Karl Valentin

17 October 2009 9	Hamburger SV	0–0	Bayer Leverkusen	Hamburg
18:30 CEST (UTC+2)	Demel (yellow card) 42'	Report	Vidal (yellow card) 30'; Barnetta (yellow card) 42'; Kießling (yellow card) 78'	Stadium: HSH Nordbank Arena; Referee: Florian Meyer; Assistant referees: Carsten Kadach, Frank Willenborg; Fourth official: Stefan Trautmann

25 October 2009 10	Schalke 04	3–3	Hamburger SV	Gelsenkirchen
17:30 CET (UTC+1)	Bordon (yellow card) 29'; Kurányi 50', 90'; Schmitz 62'; Zambrano (yellow card) 86'	Report	Berg 26', 80'; Trochowski 45'; Mathijsen (yellow card) 52'; Elia (yellow card) 53'; Rozehnal (red card) 61'; Jarolím (yellow card) 63'	Stadium: Veltins-Arena; Referee: Manuel Gräfe; Assistant referees: Christoph Bornhorst, Markus Hacker; Fourth official: Tobias Welz

31 October 2009 11	Hamburger SV	2–3	Borussia Mönchengladbach	Hamburg
15:30 CET (UTC+1)	Trochowski 13', (yellow card) 42'; Zé Roberto 47'; Aogo (yellow card) 55'	Report	Reus 39'; Marx (yellow card) 44'; Dante 76'; Arango (yellow card) 81'; Friend 82'	Stadium: HSH Nordbank Arena; Referee: Deniz Aytekin; Assistant referees: Christian Leicher, Thorsten Schiffner; Fourth official: Thorsten Schriever

8 November 2009 12	Hannover 96	2–2	Hamburger SV	Hanover
15:30 CET (UTC+1)	Djakpa (yellow card) 23'; Ya Konan 26'; Schulz (yellow card) 84'; Štajner 88' (pen.); Balitsch (yellow card) 90+3'	Report	Jansen 15'; Rozehnal (yellow card) 30'; Elia 44', (yellow card) 82'; Trochowski (yellow card) 46'; Torun (yellow card) 59'; Berg (yellow card) 85'	Stadium: AWD-Arena; Referee: Jochen Drees; Assistant referees: Torsten Bauer, Markus Wingenbach; Fourth official: Stefan Lupp

22 November 2009 13	Hamburger SV	0–1	VfL Bochum	Hamburg
17:30 CET (UTC+1)	Torun (yellow card) 90+1'	Report	Prokoph (yellow card) 74'; Grote 77'; Heerwagen (yellow card) 90+4'	Stadium: HSH Nordbank Arena; Referee: Günter Perl; Assistant referees: Josef Maier, Georg Schalk; Fourth official: Carsten Kadach

28 November 2009 14	Mainz 05	1–1	Hamburger SV	Mainz
15:30 CET (UTC+1)	Noveski (yellow card) 13'; Bungert (yellow card) 77'; Ivanschitz (yellow card) 81'; Hoogland 84'	Report	Torun 3'; Boateng (yellow card) 83'; Jansen (yellow card) 84'	Stadium: Bruchwegstadion; Referee: Manuel Gräfe; Assistant referees: Bastian Dankert, Markus Hacker; Fourth official: Robert Kempter

5 December 2009 15	Hamburger SV	0–0	1899 Hoffenheim	Hamburg
15:30 CET (UTC+1)	Demel (yellow card) 56'; Petrić (yellow card) 82'; Rincón (yellow card) 88'	Report	Eichner (yellow card) 75'	Stadium: HSH Nordbank Arena; Referee: Wolfgang Stark; Assistant referees: Mike Pickel, Jan-Hendrik Salver; Fourth official: Florian Steuer

12 December 2009 16	1. FC Nürnberg	0–4	Hamburger SV	Nuremberg
15:30 CET (UTC+1)	Bunjaku (yellow card) 25'; Diekmeier (yellow card) 43'; Pinola (yellow card) 61'	Report	Elia (yellow card) 42', (goal) 47', 74'; Jarolím (yellow card) 45'; Jansen 59'; Torun 66'	Stadium: easyCredit-Stadion; Referee: Thorsten Kinhöfer; Assistant referees: Christian Fischer, Detlef Scheppe; Fourth official: Robert Kampka

20 December 2009 17	Hamburger SV	2–1	Werder Bremen	Hamburg
15:30 CET (UTC+1)	Mathijsen 9'; Rincón (yellow card) 12'; Boateng (red card) 32'; Jansen 36'; Aogo (yellow card) 67'; Demel (yellow card) 77'; Jarolím (yellow card) 78'	Report	Prödl (yellow card) 38'; Jensen (yellow card) 50'; Naldo (yellow card) 73', (goal) 90+3'; Hunt (yellow card) 77'	Stadium: HSH Nordbank Arena; Referee: Florian Meyer; Assistant referees: Carsten Kadach, Frank Willenborg; Fourth official: Holger Henschel

16 January 2010 18	Hamburger SV	2–0	SC Freiburg	Hamburg
15:30 CET (UTC+1)	Jansen 7'; Petrić 55'	Report		Stadium: HSH Nordbank Arena; Referee: Lutz Wagner; Assistant referees: Bastian Dankert, Daniel Siebert; Fourth official: Malte Dittrich

23 January 2010 19	Borussia Dortmund	1–0	Hamburger SV	Dortmund
18:30 CET (UTC+1)	Valdez 36'; Subotić (yellow card) 48'	Report	Mathijsen (yellow card) 35'; Boateng (yellow card) 57'; Rozehnal (yellow card) 90+2'	Stadium: Signal Iduna Park; Referee: Manuel Gräfe; Assistant referees: Christian Dingert, Markus Hacker; Fourth official: Mark Borsch

29 January 2010 20	Hamburger SV	1–1	VfL Wolfsburg	Hamburg
20:30 CET (UTC+1)	Berg (yellow card) 33'; Jansen (yellow card) 51'; Rozehnal (yellow card) 75'; Trochowski 90+2'	Report	Džeko 34'; Gentner (yellow card) 70'; Hasebe (yellow card) 78'	Stadium: HSH Nordbank Arena; Referee: Thorsten Kinhöfer; Assistant referees: Christian Fischer, Detlef Scheppe; Fourth official: Stefan Lupp

6 February 2010 21	1. FC Köln	3–3	Hamburger SV	Cologne
15:30 CET (UTC+1)	Mohamad 31', (yellow card) 70'; Petit (yellow card) 59'; Novaković 75'; Chihi 88'	Report	Jansen 2'; Petrić 36', 50' (pen.); Jarolím (yellow card) 55'; Rincón (yellow card) 77'	Stadium: RheinEnergieStadion; Referee: Michael Weiner; Assistant referees: Thomas Frank, Robert Hartmann; Fourth official: Dirk Margenberg

13 February 2010 22	VfB Stuttgart	1–3	Hamburger SV	Stuttgart
15:30 CET (UTC+1)	Marica (yellow card) 45+1'; Träsch 55'	Report	Berg 23'; Van Nistelrooy 75', 76'; Jarolím (yellow card) 86'	Stadium: Mercedes-Benz Arena; Referee: Deniz Aytekin; Assistant referees: Christian Bandurski, Thorsten Schiffner; Fourth official: Georg Schalk

20 February 2010 23	Hamburger SV	0–0	Eintracht Frankfurt	Hamburg
15:30 CET (UTC+1)	Rincón (yellow card) 58'; Zé Roberto (yellow card) 70'	Report	Schwegler (yellow card) 59'; Franz (yellow card) 73'; Teber (yellow card) 75'	Stadium: HSH Nordbank Arena; Referee: Markus Wingenbach; Assistant referees: Marco Achmüller, Guido Kleve; Fourth official: Frank Willenborg

28 February 2010 24	Bayern Munich	1–0	Hamburger SV	Munich
17:30 CET (UTC+1)	Van Bommel (yellow card) 32'; Ribéry 78'; Schweinsteiger (yellow card) 87'	Report	Boateng (yellow card) 35'; Demel (yellow card) 89'	Stadium: Allianz Arena; Referee: Lutz Wagner; Assistant referees: Bastian Dankert, Tobias Stieler; Fourth official: Wolfgang Walz

6 March 2010 25	Hamburger SV	1–0	Hertha BSC	Hamburg
15:30 CET (UTC+1)	Jansen 40'; Rincón (yellow card) 56'	Report	Lustenberger (yellow card) 13'; Hubník (yellow card) 50'; Kobiashvili (yellow card) 83'	Stadium: HSH Nordbank Arena; Referee: Helmut Fleischer; Assistant referees: Sönke Glindemann, René Kunsleben; Fourth official: Thorsten Schriever

14 March 2010 26	Bayer Leverkusen	4–2	Hamburger SV	Leverkusen
17:30 CET (UTC+1)	Kießling 22', 62'; Derdiyok 55', (yellow card) 83'; Vidal (yellow card) 60'; Castro 84'	Report	Zé Roberto 33'; Rozehnal 83'	Stadium: BayArena; Referee: Deniz Aytekin; Assistant referees: Christian Leicher, Thorsten Schiffner; Fourth official: Tobias Welz

21 March 2010 27	Hamburger SV	2–2	Schalke 04	Hamburg
15:30 CET (UTC+1)	Van Nistelrooy 40'; Jansen (yellow card) 57'; Pitroipa 77'	Report	Kluge (yellow card) 14'; Höwedes (yellow card) 56'; Kurányi 62'; Rakitić 68' (pen.)	Stadium: HSH Nordbank Arena; Referee: Wolfgang Stark; Assistant referees: Robert Kempter, Jan-Hendrik Salver; Fourth official: Thomas Metzen

28 March 2010 28	Borussia Mönchengladbach	1–0	Hamburger SV	Mönchengladbach
17:30 CEST (UTC+2)	Brouwers 43'; Marx (yellow card) 71'	Report	Demel (yellow card) 57'; Guerrero (yellow card) 71'; Jarolím (yellow card) 86'	Stadium: Borussia-Park; Referee: Helmut Fleischer; Assistant referees: Sönke Glindemann, Guido Kleve; Fourth official: Christian Bandurski

4 April 2010 29	Hamburger SV	0–0	Hannover 96	Hamburg
17:30 CEST (UTC+2)	Jarolím (yellow card) 83'; Mathijsen (yellow card) 88'; Zé Roberto (yellow card) 89'	Report	Štajner (yellow card) 52' (yellow-red card) 59'	Stadium: HSH Nordbank Arena; Referee: Peter Sippel; Assistant referees: Tobias Christ, Walter Hofmann; Fourth official: Christian Schößling

11 April 2010 30	VfL Bochum	1–2	Hamburger SV	Bochum
15:30 CEST (UTC+2)	Dedić 32'; Pfertzel (yellow card) 47'; Šesták (yellow card) 67'	Report	Tesche 18'; Petrić (yellow card) 43'; Johansson 88' (o.g.)	Stadium: RewirpowerSTADION; Referee: Wolfgang Stark; Assistant referees: Mike Pickel, Thorsten Schiffner; Fourth official: Frank Willenborg

17 April 2010 31	Hamburger SV	0–1	Mainz 05	Hamburg
15:30 CEST (UTC+2)		Report	Bancé 20'	Stadium: HSH Nordbank Arena; Referee: Günter Perl; Assistant referees: Christian Bandurski, Josef Maier; Fourth official: Georg Schalk

25 April 2010 32	1899 Hoffenheim	5–1	Hamburger SV	Sinsheim
15:30 CEST (UTC+2)	Ibišević 2', 11'; Šimunić (yellow card) 22'; Obasi 31', 72'; Salihović 77'; Weis (yellow card) 87'	Report	Tesche 65'; Arslan (red card) 89'	Stadium: Rhein-Neckar-Arena; Referee: Manuel Gräfe; Assistant referees: Christian Dingert, Markus Hacker; Fourth official: Kai Voss

1 May 2010 33	Hamburger SV	4–0	1. FC Nürnberg	Hamburg
15:30 CEST (UTC+2)	Pitroipa 9', (yellow card) 52'; Petrić 19', 25'; Jarolím (yellow card) 69'; Van Nistelrooy 73'	Report	Diekmeier (yellow card) 61'; Wolf (yellow card) 78'	Stadium: HSH Nordbank Arena; Referee: Thorsten Kinhöfer; Assistant referees: Christian Fischer, Detlef Scheppe; Fourth official: Bastian Dankert

8 May 2010 34	Werder Bremen	1–1	Hamburger SV	Bremen
15:30 CEST (UTC+2)	Bargfrede (yellow card) 32'; Pizarro 58'; Frings (yellow card) 76'	Report	Jarolím (yellow card) 14'; Pitroipa (yellow card) 77'; Van Nistelrooy 82'	Stadium: Weserstadion; Referee: Michael Weiner; Assistant referees: Thomas Frank, Tobias Welz; Fourth official: Harm Osmers

=== DFB-Pokal ===
==== First round ====
3 August 2009	Fortuna Düsseldorf	3–3 (a.e.t.) (1–4 p)	Hamburger SV	Düsseldorf
20:30 UTC+2	Fink 11'; Boateng 16' (o.g.); Lambertz 120'	Report (in German)	Petrić 4'; Trochowski 54', 95' (pen.)	Stadium: ESPRIT Arena; Attendance: 40,000; Referee: Babak Rafati (Hanover)
	Penalties
	Christ (penalty scored); Heidinger (penalty missed); Caillas (penalty missed)		(penalty scored) Zé Roberto; (penalty scored) Trochowski; (penalty scored) Mathijsen; (penalty scored) Jansen

==== Second round ====
23 September 2009	VfL Osnabrück	3–3 (a.e.t.) (4–2 p)	Hamburger SV	Osnabrück
20:30 UTC+2	Hansen 52'; Siegert 67'; Grieneisen 116'	Report (in German)	Petrić 77'; Trochowski 90+2' (pen.); Demel 100'	Stadium: Osnatel-Arena; Attendance: 16,100; Referee: Markus Wingenbach (Diez)
	Penalties
	Schmidt (penalty scored); Lindemann (penalty scored); Nickenig (penalty scored); Heidrich (penalty scored)		(penalty missed) Tesche; (penalty scored) Trochowski; (penalty scored) Elia; (penalty missed) Petrić

=== Europa League ===
==== Third qualifying round ====
30 July 2009	Randers (Denmark)	0–4	(Germany) Hamburg	Essex Park Randers, Randers
20:35		Report	Guerrero 11'; Boateng 24'; Petrić 53'; Trochowski 80' (pen.)	Attendance: 5,800; Referee: Anton Genov (Bulgaria)

6 August 2009	Hamburg (Germany)	0–1 (4–1 agg.)	(Denmark) Randers	HSH Nordbank Arena, Hamburg
20:30		Report	Berg 35'	Attendance: 41,793; Referee: Kevin Blom (Netherlands)

==== Play-off round ====
20 August 2009	Guingamp (France)	1–5	(Germany) Hamburg	Stade du Roudourou, Guingamp
18:45	Hesl 89' (o.g.)	Report	Guerrero 7'; Petrić 11', 26', 86'; Berg 51'	Attendance: 12,694; Referee: Marcin Borski (Poland)

27 August 2009	Hamburg (Germany)	3–1 (8–2 agg.)	(France) Guingamp	HSH Nordbank Arena, Hamburg
20:30	Tesche 42', 51'; Berg 47'	Report	Mathis 90'	Attendance: 25,798; Referee: Martin Ingvarsson (Sweden)

==== Group stage ====
Pos	Team	Pld	W	D	L	GF	GA	GD	Pts	Qualification
1	(Israel) Hapoel Tel Aviv	6	4	0	2	13	8	+5	12	Advance to knockout phase
2	(Germany) Hamburger SV	6	3	1	2	7	6	+1	10	Advance to knockout phase
3	(Scotland) Celtic	6	1	3	2	7	7	0	6	
4	(Austria) Rapid Wien	6	1	2	3	8	14	−6	5	

Source: Soccerway

17 September 2009	Rapid Wien (Austria)	3–0	(Germany) Hamburg	Ernst-Happel-Stadion, Vienna ^{3}
19:00	Hofmann 35'; Jelavić 44'; Drazan 76'	Report		Attendance: 49,850; Referee: Ivan Bebek (Croatia)

1 October 2009	Hamburg (Germany)	4–2	(Israel) Hapoel Tel Aviv	HSH Nordbank Arena, Hamburg
21:05	Berg 5', 12'; Elia 41'; Zé Roberto 77'	Report	Shechter 36'; Yeboah 61'	Attendance: 29,976; Referee: István Vad (Hungary)

22 October 2009	Celtic (Scotland)	0–1	(Germany) Hamburg	Celtic Park, Glasgow
21:05		Report	Berg 63'	Attendance: 38,821; Referee: Gianluca Rocchi (Italy)

5 November 2009	Hamburg (Germany)	0–0	(Scotland) Celtic	HSH Nordbank Arena, Hamburg
19:00		Report		Attendance: 45,037; Referee: Carlos Velasco Carballo (Spain)

2 December 2009	Hamburg (Germany)	2–0	(Austria) Rapid Wien	HSH Nordbank Arena, Hamburg
21:05	Jansen 47'; Berg 53'	Report		Attendance: 45,737; Referee: Bas Nijhuis (Netherlands)

17 December 2009	Hapoel Tel Aviv (Israel)	1–0	(Germany) Hamburg	Bloomfield Stadium, Tel Aviv
19:00	Yeboah 23'	Report		Attendance: 15,164; Referee: Aleksei Nikolaev (Russia)

==== Round of 32 ====
18 February 2010	Hamburg (Germany)	1–0	(Netherlands) PSV Eindhoven	HSH Nordbank Arena, Hamburg
21:05	Jansen 26' (pen.)	Report		Attendance: 35,672; Referee: Claudio Circhetta (Switzerland)

25 February 2010	PSV Eindhoven (Netherlands)	3–2 (3–3a agg.)	(Germany) Hamburg	Philips Stadion, Eindhoven
19:00	Toivonen 2'; Dzsudzsák 43'; Koevermans 90'	Report	Petrić 46'; Trochowski 79' (pen.)	Attendance: 30,500; Referee: Mike Dean (England)

==== Round of 16 ====
11 March 2010	Hamburg (Germany)	3–1	(Belgium) Anderlecht	HSH Nordbank Arena, Hamburg
19:00	Mathijsen 23'; Van Nistelrooy 40'; Jarolím 76'	Report	Legear 45'	Attendance: 34,921; Referee: Laurent Duhamel (France)

18 March 2010	Anderlecht (Belgium)	4–3 (5–6 agg.)	(Germany) Hamburg	Constant Vanden Stock Stadium, Brussels
21:05	Lukaku 44'; Suárez 45+3' (pen.); Biglia 59'; Boussoufa 66'	Report	Boateng 42'; Jansen 54'; Petrić 75'	Attendance: 21,000; Referee: Terje Hauge (Norway)

==== Quarter-finals ====
1 April 2010	Hamburg (Germany)	2–1	(Belgium) Standard Liège	HSH Nordbank Arena, Hamburg
21:05	Petrić 42' (pen.); Van Nistelrooy 45'	Report	Mbokani 31'	Attendance: 48,437; Referee: Martin Atkinson (England)

8 April 2010	Standard Liège (Belgium)	1–3 (2–5 agg.)	(Germany) Hamburg	Stade Maurice Dufrasne, Liège
21:05	De Camargo 33'	Report	Petrić 20', 35'; Guerrero 90+4'	Attendance: 27,000; Referee: Pedro Proença (Portugal)

==== Semi-finals ====
22 April 2010	Hamburg (Germany)	0–0	(England) Fulham	HSH Nordbank Arena, Hamburg
21:05		Report		Attendance: 49,000; Referee: Claus Bo Larsen (Denmark)

29 April 2010	Fulham (England)	2–1 (2–1 agg.)	(Germany) Hamburg	Craven Cottage, London
21:05	Davies 69'; Gera 76'	Report	Petrić 22'	Attendance: 25,700; Referee: Cüneyt Çakır (Turkey)
