= 2009–10 1. FC Köln season =

1. FC Köln
2009–10 season
- Manager: Zvonimir Soldo
- Stadium: RheinEnergieStadion
- Bundesliga: 13th
- DFB-Pokal: Quarter-finals

The 2012–13 1. FC Köln season was the 61st season in club history.

== Season summary ==
Köln consolidated their position in the Bundesliga in Zvonimir Soldo's first season with a secure finish in midtable.

== Kit ==
Köln's kit was manufactured by Reebok and sponsored by Cologne-based supermarket chain REWE.

== First-team squad ==
Squad at end of season

Note: Flags indicate national team as defined under FIFA eligibility rules; some limited exceptions apply. Players may hold more than one non-FIFA nationality.

No.	Pos.	Nation	Player
1	GK	COL	Faryd Mondragón
2	DF	SVN	Mišo Brečko
3	DF	LBN	Youssef Mohamad (captain)
6	DF	CMR	Pierre Womé
7	FW	GER	Sebastian Freis
8	MF	POR	Petit (Note: Petit was born in Strasbourg, France, but also qualified to represent Portugal internationally and made his international debut for Portugal in June 2001.)
9	FW	NGA	Manasseh Ishiaku
10	FW	GER	Lukas Podolski (Note: Podolski was born in Gliwice, Poland, but was raised in Germany from the age of 2 and represented Germany at U-17, U-18, U-19 and U-21 level before making his international debut for Germany in June 2004.)
11	FW	SVN	Milivoje Novaković
12	MF	POR	Maniche
13	DF	GER	Daniel Brosinski
14	MF	SRB	Zoran Tošić (on loan from Manchester United)
15	FW	GER	Simon Terodde
16	DF	GER	Christopher Schorch
17	DF	GER	Kevin Pezzoni
18	GK	GER	Thomas Kessler

No.	Pos.	Nation	Player
19	MF	GER	Taner Yalçın (Note: Yalçın was born in Cologne, West Germany (now Germany), but also qualified to represent Turkey internationally and represented Turkey at U-18 and U-19 level before representing Germany at U-19, U-20, and U-21 level.)
20	MF	MAR	Adil Chihi (Note: Chihi was born in Düsseldorf, West Germany (now Germany), but also qualified to represent Morocco internationally and made his international debut for Morocco in August 2008.)
21	DF	BRA	Pedro Geromel
22	MF	FRA	Fabrice Ehret (Note: Ehret was born in Lugano, Switzerland, but also qualified to represent France internationally and represented France at U-21 level.)
23	DF	CAN	Kevin McKenna
24	FW	ANG	José Pierre Vunguidica
25	MF	POL	Adam Matuszczyk
27	MF	GER	Christian Clemens
28	DF	GER	Carsten Cullmann
29	MF	GER	Sebastian Zielinsky
32	DF	GER	Stephan Salger
33	MF	GER	Michael Niedrig
34	GK	CRO	Miro Varvodić (on loan from Hajduk Split)
35	DF	GER	Alexander Vaaßen
37	MF	GER	Reinhold Yabo
39	DF	GER	Andreas Dick

=== Left club during season ===
Note: Flags indicate national team as defined under FIFA eligibility rules; some limited exceptions apply. Players may hold more than one non-FIFA nationality.

No.	Pos.	Nation	Player
4	DF	GER	Marvin Matip (Note: Matip was born in Bochum, West Germany (now Germany), and represented Germany at U-21 level, but also qualified to represent Cameroon internationally through his father and made his international debut for Cameroon in June 2013.) (on loan from Karlsruhe)
14	FW	BFA	Wilfried Sanou (on loan to Urawa Red Diamonds)

No.	Pos.	Nation	Player
26	MF	GER	Lukas Nottbeck (to Borussia Dortmund II)
30	MF	GER	Michael Gardawski (to Carl Zeiss Jena)
