= Jonathan Pitroipa =

Burkinabè footballer (born 1986)

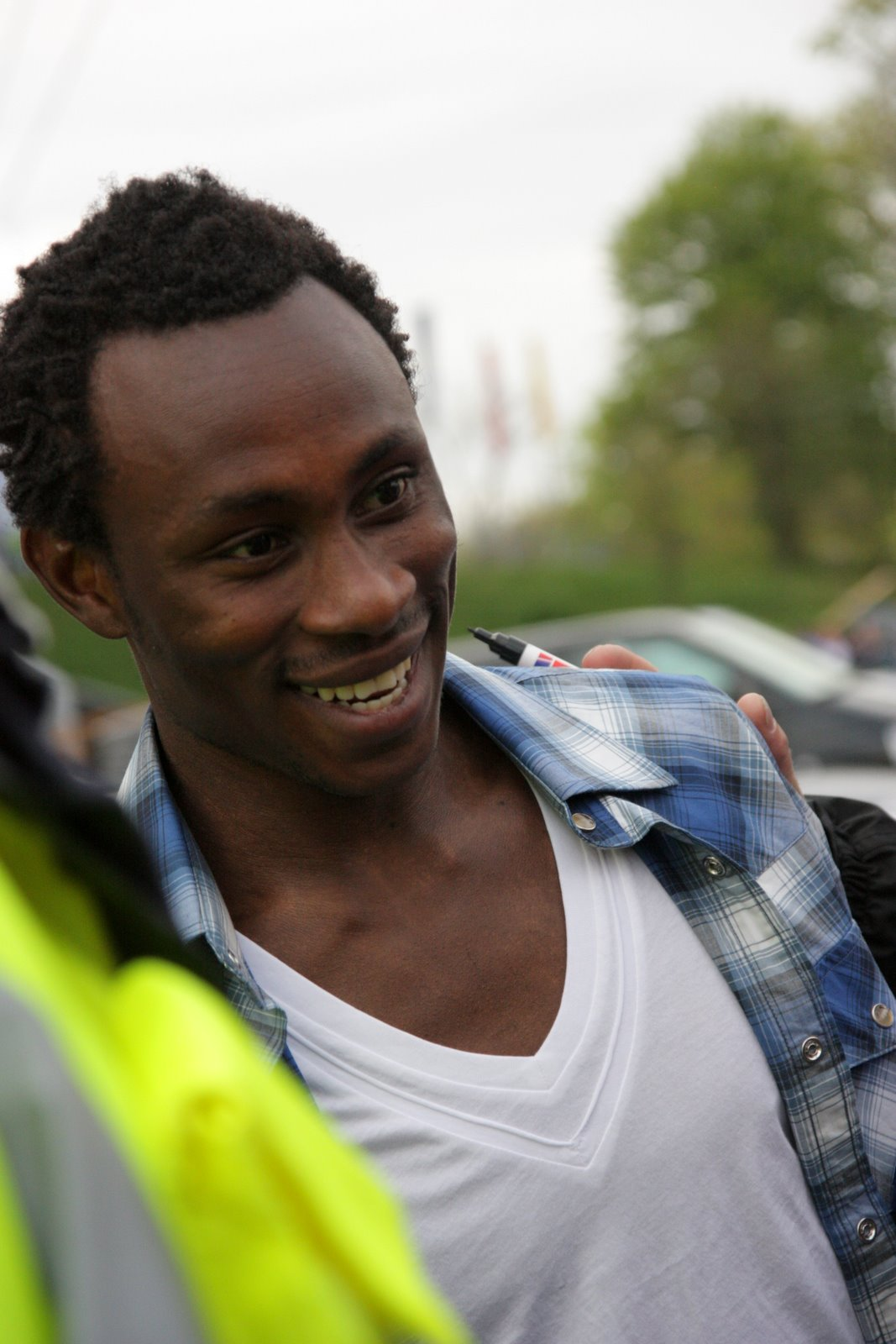
- Pitroipa in 2010

Personal information
- Full name: Beninwende Yann Jonathan Pitroipa
- Date of birth: 12 April 1986 (age 40)
- Place of birth: Ouagadougou, Burkina Faso
- Height: 1.76 m (5 ft 9 in)
- Position: Winger

Youth career
- 2004: Planete Champion

Senior career*
Years	Team	Apps	(Gls)
2004–2008	SC Freiburg	71	(16)
2008–2011	Hamburger SV	74	(6)
2011–2014	Rennes	91	(14)
2014–2015	Al Jazira Club	25	(9)
2015–2017	Al-Nasr	38	(12)
2018	Antwerp	7	(0)
2018–2021	Paris FC	69	(3)
Total		375	(60)

International career
2006–2019	Burkina Faso	82	(19)
Medal record
Representing Burkina Faso
Africa Cup of Nations
Runner-up	2013 South Africa
Third place	2017 Gabon
- * Club domestic league appearances and goals

Beninwende Yann Jonathan Pitroipa (born 12 April 1986) is a Burkinabé former professional footballer who played as a winger.

Since making his debut for Burkina Faso in 2006, he has featured at the 2010, 2012 and 2013 editions of the African Cup of Nations, scoring two goals in the 2013 tournament as Burkina Faso reached the final. He was also chosen the Player of the Tournament.

== Club career ==
=== Freiburg ===
Pitroipa played for Planete Champion in his native Burkina Faso until 2004, when he moved to Germany. In 2004, he signed with Bundesliga side SC Freiburg. He scored his first goal for Freiburg in a 3–3 draw with SpVgg Greuther Fürth on 22 September 2006. He went on to make 75 league appearances, both in the Bundesliga and 2. Bundesliga, and scored 16 goals.

=== Hamburger SV ===
In July 2008, Pitroipa moved to Hamburger SV on a free transfer. In his last season in the Bundesliga with Hamburg, he appeared in 26 games, adding two goals and six assists. After the dismissal of head coach Armin Veh in March 2011, Pitroipa voiced his unhappiness with the coaching situation. Under new manager Michael Oenning, Pitroipa was relegated to a bit-part role for the club and expressed his desire to leave Hamburg in search of regular football. Hamburg's new director of football, Frank Arnesen, formerly of Chelsea, did not help matters either, bringing in many young players in an effort to freshen up the squad and start a new era.

Pitroipa's last game for the club came on the final day of the 2010–11 Bundesliga season, coming on as a 38th-minute substitute for striker Paolo Guerrero in Hamburg's 1–1 draw with Borussia Mönchengladbach. Pitroipa made a total of 97 appearances for Hamburg, scoring six goals and adding ten assists. His exit from the club was part of a mass exodus of star names, as Frank Rost, Zé Roberto, Joris Mathijsen, Piotr Trochowski and Ruud van Nistelrooy were also shown the door.

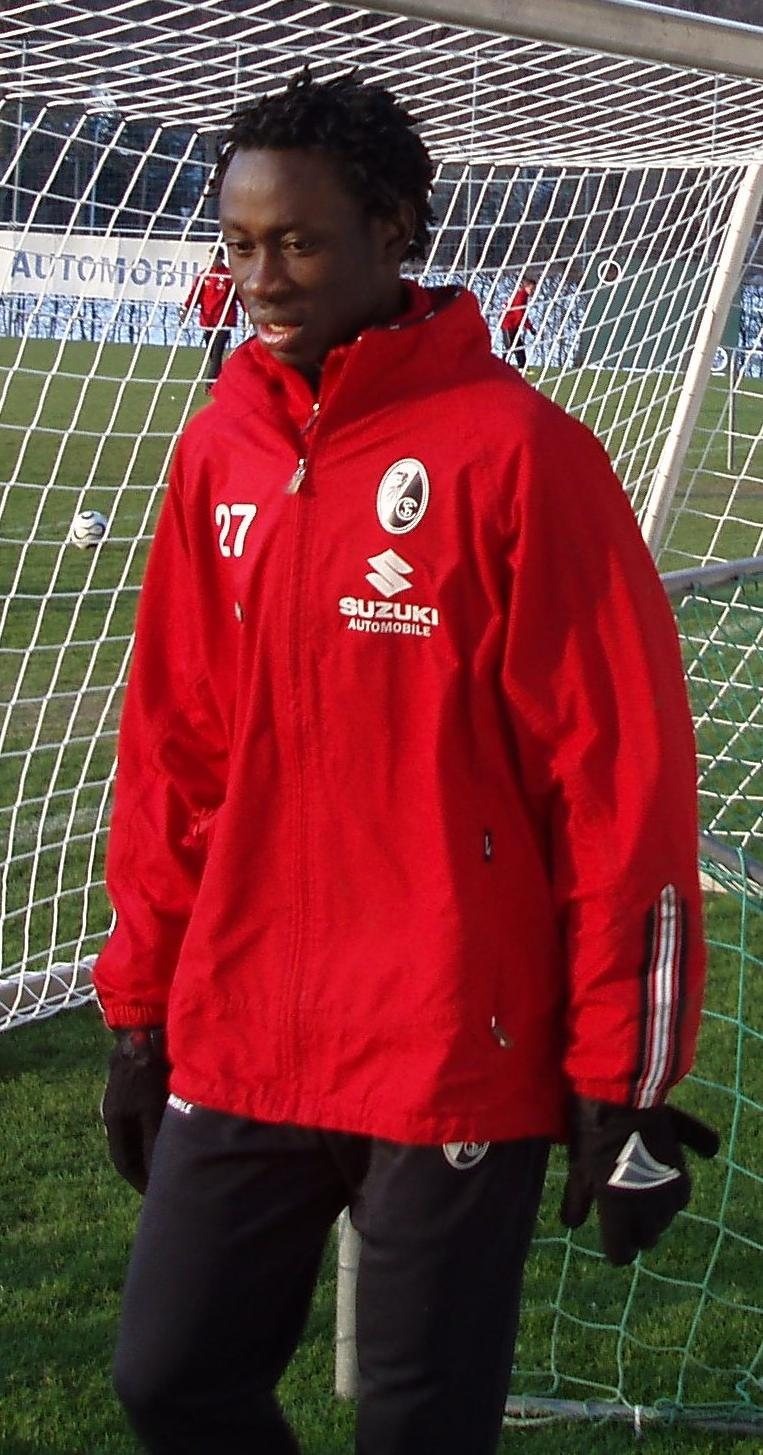
Pitroipa during his spell with SC Freiburg

=== Rennes ===
On 7 July 2011, Pitroipa completed his transfer to French side Rennes for £3.16 million transfer fee, well under the €5 million sum desired by Hamburg. Rennes were keen on securing the signature of the Burkina Faso international for a long time, impressed by "his pace and dribbling skills". In his first official appearance for his new club, Pitroipa scored a brace against Georgian side Metalurgi Rustavi in the first leg of their Europa League Playoff tie on 28 July 2011. Pitroipa made his Ligue 1 debut with Rennes in their league opener against newly promoted Dijon on 7 August 2011, which ended in a 5–1 victory. He helped in the build-up for the opening goal, delivering a long pass to Abdoulrazak Boukari, who then flicked it on to Víctor Montaño, who slid it in. This marked the first time in nine years that Rennes scored five goals in a Ligue 1 game. The following weekend, Pitroipa scored his first Ligue 1 goal for Rennes in their 1–1 draw with Paris Saint-Germain on 13 August 2011. His 88th-minute equalizer denied the free-spending capital club their first win of the season and ensured that his side remained undefeated from their opening two league outings.

After defeating Metalurgi Rustavi 7–2 on aggregate, Rennes were drawn against Red Star Belgrade in the Europa League Play-off. Pitroipa started the first leg at the Stadion FK Crvena Zvezda in Serbia and continued his fine goal-scoring form, netting the equalizing goal for his side in the 41st minute. Substitute Víctor Montaño grabbed the winning goal for the visitors in the second-half, putting them in a comfortable position to advance to the group stages of the Europa League. Rennes won the second leg in convincing fashion, 4–0, to advance to the group stages.

Pitroipa beat Bakary Koné to the ball and shot past Hugo Lloris to help Rennes record a 2–1 victory over Lyon on 18 November and move up to fourth in the Ligue 1 table. On 4 March 2012, he turned in a "Man of the Match" performance against Lorient as he scored a brilliant 25-yard strike with his left foot and then provided an assist for Youssouf Hadji, the man who set up Pitroipa's goal, to earn a 2–0 victory. After a mazy run through four Evian defenders, Pitroipa lofted the ball over onrushing goalkeeper Stephan Andersen as Rennes won 3–1 on 7 April to boost their bid for European football. In Rennes' game against Nice on 16 April, Pitroipa dribbled past Didier Digard before slotting the ball home, giving Rennes a 3–1 victory and putting them two points away from a Europa League spot. Pitroipa helped Rennes finish in sixth place on 60 points, thanks to scoring a goal in their 5–0 defeat of relegated Dijon on 20 May 2012; the result, however, was not good enough to secure European football for 2012–13 though.

Pitroipa scored his first goal of the 2012–13 Ligue 1 season on 25 August 2012, as Rennes registered their first victory of the campaign with a 3–2 defeat of Bastia, also providing the assist for Mevlüt Erdinç's strike. He scored the winning goal for Rennes a minute from time against Troyes on 2 December, completing a comeback victory from 1–2 down to seal a 3–2 win and a third-straight Ligue 1 victory.

=== Antwerp ===
In early January 2018, Pitroipa was one of four signings to be announced by Belgian First Division A side Royal Antwerp F.C. Free agent Pitroipa signed a six-month contract.

=== Paris FC ===
Pitroipa joined Paris FC in 2018. He left in January 2021 after making a total of 69 league appearances and scoring 3 league goals.

=== Retirement ===
Pitroipa announced his retirement from playing in February 2021.

== International career ==
Pitroipa made his debut for Burkina Faso in 2006. On 20 June 2009, he scored a 27th-minute goal against the Ivory Coast to put the score at 1–1 and a later own goal put his side into a 2–1 lead before a late fightback from the Elephants secured a 3–2 victory for Ivory Coast in the third round of CAF 2010 FIFA World Cup qualifying.

Pitroipa was part of the final squads at the 2010 Africa Cup of Nations in Angola and the 2012 edition in Equatorial Guinea.

Following his success in Ligue 1, Pitroipa was called up to the Burkina Faso squad to the 2013 African Cup of Nations. In the tournament, he scored an injury time goal against Ethiopia in their second group game, securing a 4–0 victory for his country. Burkina Faso advanced out of the group stage and into the quarter-finals of the competition where they faced Togo on 3 February, and Pitroipa scored the only goal of the game in the 105th minute to send the Stallions into the semi-finals. Pitroipa was controversially sent off in the semi-final game of the competition against Ghana, when he was booked for simulation in the 117th minute while it appeared that he had been fouled in the penalty box. The Stallions overcame his sending off and won 3–2 in the penalty shoot-out after the game had finished 1–1 after extra time, booking the country's first ever trip to the African Cup of Nations final. The red card was later overturned by the CAF executive committee after referee Slim Jedidi admitted to having made a mistake by showing the second yellow card. Burkina Faso lost in the final to Nigeria by a score of 1–0, but Pitroipa was named as the "Player of the Tournament" by CAF.

He retired from international football in December 2019.

== Coaching career ==
In October 2008, Pitroipa established, alongside Burkina Faso international teammate Wilfried Sanou, the Kada School. The club is owned by his father Miki Jean-Baptiste Pitroipa and Sanou's mother.

== Career statistics ==
=== Club ===
Appearances and goals by club, season and competition
Club	Season	League			National Cup		League Cup		Continental		Other		Total	
Club	Season	Division	Apps	Goals	Apps	Goals	Apps	Goals	Apps	Goals	Apps	Goals	Apps	Goals
SC Freiburg	2005–06	2. Bundesliga	14	1	0	0	—		—		—		14	1
SC Freiburg	2006–07	2. Bundesliga	33	8	0	0	—		—		—		33	8
SC Freiburg	2007–08	2. Bundesliga	24	7	0	0	—		—		—		24	7
SC Freiburg	Total		71	16	0	0	—		—		—		71	16
Hamburger SV	2008–09	Bundesliga	28	1	0	0	—		11 (Note: Appearances in the Europa League)	0	—		39	1
Hamburger SV	2009–10	Bundesliga	20	3	2	0	—		12	0	—		34	3
Hamburger SV	2010–11	Bundesliga	26	2	2	0	—		—		—		28	2
Hamburger SV	Total		74	6	4	0	—		23	0	—		101	6
Rennes	2011–12	Ligue 1	36	7	4	1	1	0	9	3	—		50	11
Rennes	2012–13	Ligue 1	32	7	0	0	4	1	—		—		36	8
Rennes	2013–14	Ligue 1	23	0	3	0	0	0	—		—		26	0
Rennes	Total		91	14	7	1	5	1	9	3	—		112	19
Rennes II	2013–14	CFA 2	1	0	—		—		—		—		1	0
Al Jazira	2014–15	UAE Pro League	25	9	1	0	1	1	1 (Note: Appearances in the Asian Champions League)	0	—		28	10
Al Nasr	2015–16	UAE Pro League	26	6	0	0	2	1	8	1	1	0	31	8
Al Nasr	2016–17	UAE Pro League	12	6	1	0	1	0	2	1	—		16	7
Al Nasr	Total		38	12	1	0	3	1	10	2	1	0	53	15
Royal Antwerp	2017–18	Belgian First Division A	7	0	0	0	—		0	0	3	0	10	0
Paris FC	2018–19	Ligue 2	32	3	0	0	0	0	—		1	0	33	3
Paris FC	2019–20	Ligue 2	23	0	2	1	2	1	—		—		27	2
Paris FC	2020–21	Ligue 2	14	0	0	0	—		—		—		14	0
Paris FC	Total		69	3	2	1	2	1	—		1	0	74	5
Career total			376	60	15	2	11	4	43	5	5	0	450	71

=== International ===
Appearances and goals by national team and year
National team	Year	Apps	Goals
Burkina Faso	2006	1	0
Burkina Faso	2007	6	1
Burkina Faso	2008	6	0
Burkina Faso	2009	7	2
Burkina Faso	2010	5	1
Burkina Faso	2011	3	1
Burkina Faso	2012	8	0
Burkina Faso	2013	12	5
Burkina Faso	2014	6	6
Burkina Faso	2015	9	1
Burkina Faso	2016	5	1
Burkina Faso	2017	3	0
Burkina Faso	2018	6	1
Burkina Faso	2019	5	0
Total		82	19

Scores and results list Burkina Faso's goal tally first, score column indicates score after each Pitroipa goal.

List of international goals scored by Jonathan Pitroipa
No.	Date	Venue	Opponent	Score	Result	Competition
1	24 March 2007	Stade du 4 Août, Ouagadougou, Burkina Faso	Mozambique	1–1	1–1	2008 Africa Cup of Nations qualification
2	11 February 2009	Amable-et-Micheline-Lozai Stadium, Le Petit-Quevilly, France	Togo	1–0	1–1	Friendly
3	20 June 2009	Stade du 4 Août, Ouagadougou, Burkina Faso	Ivory Coast	1–1	2–3	2010 FIFA World Cup qualification
4	17 November 2010	Parc des Sports Michel Hidalgo, Paris, France	Guinea	1–1	2–1	Friendly
5	4 June 2011	Independence Stadium, Windhoek, Namibia	Namibia	4–1	4–1	2012 Africa Cup of Nations qualification
6	25 January 2013	Mbombela Stadium, Nelspruit, South Africa	Ethiopia	4–0	4–0	2013 Africa Cup of Nations
7	3 February 2013	Mbombela Stadium, Nelspruit, South Africa	Togo	1–0	1–0 (a.e.t.)	2013 Africa Cup of Nations
8	23 March 2013	Stade du 4 Août, Ouagadougou, Burkina Faso	Niger	1–0	4–0	2014 FIFA World Cup qualification
9	9 June 2013	Stade Général-Seyni-Kountché, Niamey, Niger	Niger	1–0	1–0	2014 FIFA World Cup qualification
10	12 October 2013	Stade du 4 Août, Ouagadougou, Burkina Faso	Algeria	1–0	3–2	2014 FIFA World Cup qualification
11	6 September 2014	Stade du 4 Août, Ouagadougou, Burkina Faso	Lesotho	1–0	2–0	2015 Africa Cup of Nations qualification
12	10 September 2014	Estádio 11 de Novembro, Luanda, Angola	Angola	2–0	3–0	2015 Africa Cup of Nations qualification
13	10 September 2014	Estádio 11 de Novembro, Luanda, Angola	Angola	3–0	3–0	2015 Africa Cup of Nations qualification
14	15 October 2014	Stade du 4 Août, Ouagadougou, Burkina Faso	Gabon	1–0	1–1	2015 Africa Cup of Nations qualification
15	15 November 2014	Setsoto Stadium, Maseru, Lesotho	Lesotho	1–0	1–0	2015 Africa Cup of Nations qualification
16	19 November 2014	Stade du 4 Août, Ouagadougou, Burkina Faso	Angola	1–1	1–1	2015 Africa Cup of Nations qualification
17	17 November 2015	Stade du 4 Août, Ouagadougou, Burkina Faso	Benin	1–0	2–0	2018 FIFA World Cup qualification
18	26 March 2016	Stade du 4 Août, Ouagadougou, Burkina Faso	Uganda	1–0	1–0	2017 Africa Cup of Nations qualification
19	13 October 2018	Stade du 4 Août, Ouagadougou, Burkina Faso	Botswana	1–0	3–0	2019 Africa Cup of Nations qualification

== Honours ==
International

- African Cup of Nations runner-up: 2013; third place: 2017

Individual

- Africa Cup of Nations Player of the Tournament: 2013
- Africa Cup of Nations Team of the Tournament: 2013
- Africa Cup of Nations qualification Top scorer: 2015
