= Marcell Jansen =

German footballer (born 1985)

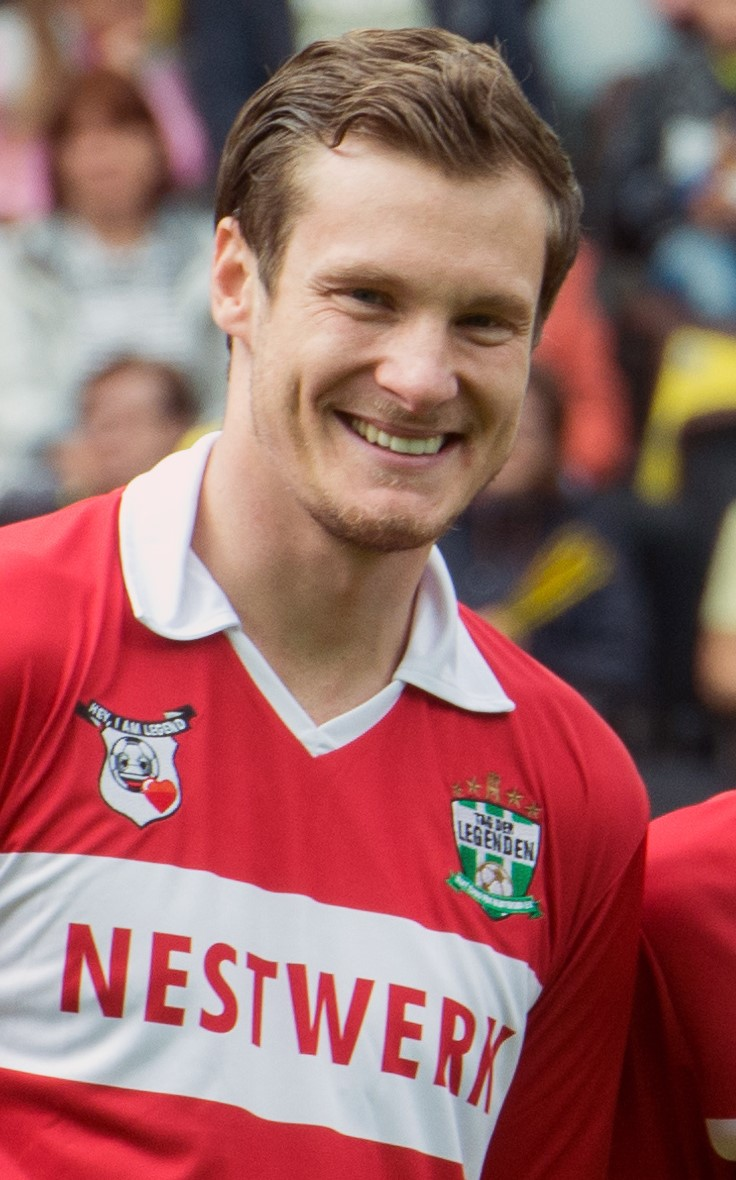
- Jansen in 2016

Personal information
- Full name: Marcell Jansen
- Date of birth: 4 November 1985 (age 41)
- Place of birth: Mönchengladbach, West Germany
- Height: 1.91 m (6 ft 3 in)
- Position: Left-back

Youth career
- 1990–1993: SV Mönchengladbach
- 1993–2004: Borussia Mönchengladbach

Senior career*
Years	Team	Apps	(Gls)
2004–2007	Borussia Mönchengladbach	73	(5)
2007–2008	Bayern Munich	17	(0)
2008–2015	Hamburger SV	152	(20)
2009	Hamburger SV II	1	(0)
2018–2025	Hamburger SV III	90	(58)
Total		333	(83)

International career
2004–2005	Germany U21	4	(1)
2005–2014	Germany	45	(3)
Medal record
Men's football
Representing Germany
World Cup
Bronze medal – third place	2006 Germany	Team
Bronze medal – third place	2010 South Africa	Team
UEFA Euro
Runner-up	2008 Austria–Switzerland	Team
- * Club domestic league appearances and goals as of 10 May 2024

Marcell Jansen (German pronunciation: [maʁˈsɛl ˈjanzn̩]; born 4 November 1985) is a German former professional footballer who played as a left-back. He was well known for his accurate crossing and pace, despite his tall stature. A versatile player, Jansen primarily played as a full back or wing back on the left flank, but could also play as a left-winger.

== Club career ==
=== Borussia Mönchengladbach ===
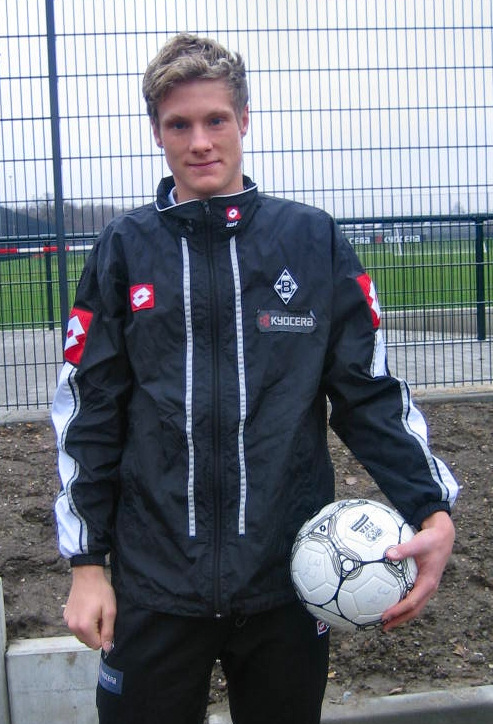
Jansen outside the training ground at Borussia Mönchengladbach

Growing up in Mönchengladbach, West Germany, Jansen joined Borussia Mönchengladbach from local SV Mönchengladbach in 1993 and progressed through the ranks at the club's academy. It was not until 2003 when then-Mönchengladbach manager Ewald Lienen named him as an unused substitute in a Bundesliga fixture of the club in a 2–0 loss against Hannover 96 on 19 September 2003. Ironically, this turned out to be Lienen's final game in charge of Mönchengladbach and Jansen returned to the U19 side.

The start of the 2004–05 season saw Jansen playing for Borussia Mönchengladbach II in the fourth division under manager Horst Köppel. By the end of 2004, Jansen was given a first team opportunity under Dick Advocaat, who gave him his debut for the side. They lost 6–0 away against Hertha BSC on 4 December 2004. During the match, which saw Hertha BSC leading 5–0 in the second half, it went bad to worse when he gave away a penalty, resulting a successful penalty kick from Marcelinho Paraíba to score Hertha's sixth goal. Nevertheless, Advocaat continued using him in the first team following an injury to club captain Christian Ziege. On 28 January 2005, Jansen signed his first professional contract with the club, keeping him until 2008. He continued to be a first team regular at the club, playing as a left-back and because of this, he earned a call up for the Germany under-21 national team as well.

It was not until on 3 April 2005 when Jansen scored his first goal for Mönchengladbach in a 2–2 draw against VfL Bochum. In his first season, Jansen went on to make 18 appearances, scoring once, in the 2004–05 season despite competing with Filip Daems for the left–back position.

In the 2005–06 season, Jansen continued to be a first-team regular, playing in both left-back and left-midfield and his impressive performance earned him a call-up from the German senior team. Due to his good performance, Jansen signed a contract extension with the club, keeping him until 2009. After the start of the season, he started every match until he suffered a calf injury. After returning from injury, he scored his first goal of the season on 17 December 2005 in a 4–3 win over Eintracht Frankfurt. By April, Jansen began playing in left-midfield after Daems was used regularly at left-back. At the end of the 2005–06 season, Jansen went on to make 33 appearances and scored once in all competitions.

Following the 2006 FIFA World Cup, Jansen was linked with a move away from Borussia Mönchengladbach, with top-flight clubs in Germany keen on signing him. However, the club insisted on not selling him, stating that he was not for sale. Jansen started the 2006–07 season playing in the left-back, dispatching Daems in the process. Jansen remained in the left-back position until he suffered a knee injury in early October. After returning to training in January, he returned to the first team on 27 January 2007, in a 3–1 loss to Energie Cottbus. Jansen then scored his first goal of the season on 2 March 2007, in a 2–0 win over Arminia Bielefeld. At the end of the 2006–07 season, which saw the club relegated to the 2. Bundesliga, Jansen had made 24 appearances and scored one goal in all competitions.

=== Bayern Munich ===
In March 2007, Bayern Munich expressed interest in Jansen following his performance for both Borussia Mönchengladbach and the Germany national team. In May 2007, it was announced Jansen would move to Bayern in July 2007 for an approximate €10 million transfer fee. Despite fears from the media he would largely remain on the substitutes' bench, Jansen said he was not afraid to be on the substitutes' bench, insisting the move was an important step of his career.

Jansen made his Bayern Munich debut in a friendly match, coming on for Philipp Lahm, in the 46th minute of a 4–0 win over Swiss side FC Schaffhausen. Jansen scored his first goal in his Bayern career in a friendly match in a 13–0 win over FC 07 Albstadt on 15 July 2007. He made his Bundesliga debut for Bayern on the opening day of the 2007–08 season in a 3–0 win over Hansa Rostock. Soon after, Jansen suffered an injury in the club's training and was sidelined throughout August. It was not until on 15 September 2007 when he returned to the first team, in a 1–1 draw against Schalke 04. Jansen played in each match until he suffered ankle injury around November that kept him out for three months. Around January, Jansen returned to training to maintain his fitness. On 1 March 2008, he returned to the first team in a 1–0 win over Schalke 04. Despite suffering from another injury towards the end of the 2007–08 season, he remained in the left-back position as the season progressed. Bayern won the Bundesliga with Jansen making 33 appearances in all competitions.

In the 2008–09 season, Jansen found himself on the bench for Bayern's opening two matches of the new Bundesliga campaign after falling out of favour with manager Jürgen Klinsmann, due to their differences.

=== Hamburger SV ===
On 28 August 2008, Hamburger SV announced Jansen had signed a five-year contract until 2013 for an €8 million transfer fee. Two days after signing, he made his Hamburg debut in a 4–2 win over Arminia Bielefeld. After debuting, he was given a handful of first-team appearances and became a first-team regular, playing in midfield. However, in mid-October Jansen suffered a muscle injury that kept him out throughout the month. On 8 November 2008, he played again as second-half substitute in a 2–1 win over Borussia Dortmund. His first goals came on 22 February 2009, in a 2–1 win over Bayer Leverkusen. After suffering an injury which kept him out of play throughout April, Jansen scored on his return on 3 May 2009 in a 1–1 draw against Hertha BSC. In the 2008–09 season, Jansen made 40 appearances and scored 4 goals in all competitions.

At the start of the 2009–10 season, Jansen suffered a tore collateral ligament which kept him out for two months. After returning from injury, he scored his first goal on 8 November 2009 in a 2–2 draw against Hannover 96. By the end of 2009, Jansen added four more goals in all competitions, including three goals in three Bundesliga matches between 12 December 2009 and 16 January 2010, against 1. FC Nürnberg, Werder Bremen and SC Freiburg. A combination of the flu and a ligament tear restricted his first team appearances as the 2009–10 season progressed. During the 2009–10 season, Jansen made 28 appearances and scored 9 goals in all competitions.

In the 2010–11 season, Jansen began the season playing at left-back. He continued to play the role until he was plagued by injuries which kept him out for three months. Jansen returned on 29 January 2011 to the first team, coming on as a second-half substitute in a 2–0 loss against 1. FC Nürnberg. He scored his first goal of the season on 26 February 2011 in a 1–1 draw against 1. FC Kaiserslautern. However, he suffered a hip injury in training which kept him out for the rest of the season. Despite this, Jansen finished the 2010–11 season, making 17 appearances and scoring 2 times in all competitions.

Ahead the 2011–12 season, Jansen was linked with clubs such as Milan and VfL Wolfsburg. But Jansen made it clear that he was not leaving the club and stayed throughout the summer transfer window. Jansen eventually returned to training from injury ahead of the new season and made his return in the opening match of the season against Borussia Dortmund, setting up a goal for Robert Tesche in a 3–1 loss. After returning to the first team from injury, Jansen began playing in the midfield position, either at left-wing or left-midfield for most of the season. On 5 November 2011, he scored his first goal of the season in a 2–2 draw against Bayer Leverkusen. Despite suffering from injuries during the season, Jansen went on to make 31 appearances and scored 5 times in all competitions.

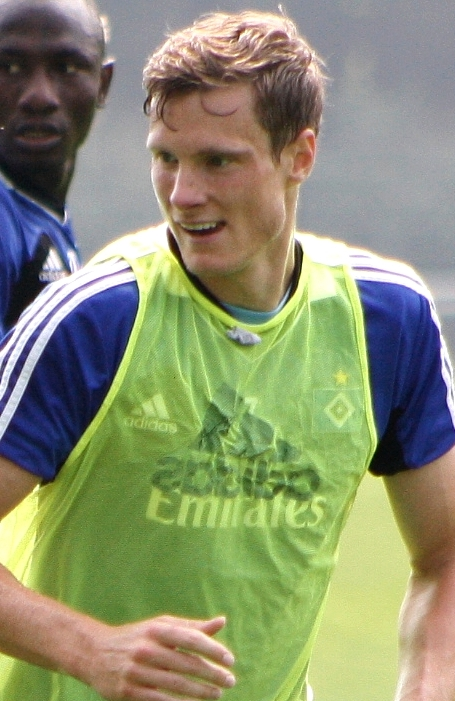
Jansen training with Hamburger SV in July 2013

Before the 2012–13 season, it was reported Jansen extended his contract with Hamburg until 2015. At the start of the season, Jansen started out at left-midfield for the first three matches before moving to left-back, which he played most of the season. However, throughout 2012, Jansen was plagued by injuries. On 20 January 2013, he returned from injury in a 1–1 draw against 1. FC Nürnberg. Jansen scored his first goal of the season on 28 April 2013, in a 4–1 loss against Schalke 04. At the end of the 2012–13 season, Jansen had made 29 appearances, scoring one goal in all competitions.

In the 2013–14 season, Jansen continued to be played at left-back for the side before suffering a fractured toe. After returning to the first team, Jansen then scored his first goal of the season on 28 September 2013 in a 2–2 draw against Eintracht Frankfurt. In the absence of Rafael van der Vaart, Jansen captained for Hamburg for the first time in his Hamburg stint on 24 November 2013 in a 3–1 win, and went on to captain the side four more times in all competitions later in the season. Although he was linked a move away from the club in the January transfer window, he suffered injuries as the 2013–14 season progressed. Despite this, Jansen returned to the first team and played in both legs of the relegation play-off matches against Greuther Fürth, where a 1–1 draw kept Hamburg retaining their Bundesliga status via an away goal. In the 2013–14 season, Jansen had made 27 appearances and scored once in all competitions.

In the 2014–15 season, with one year left on his contract, Jansen remained at the club despite the new signing of Matthias Ostrzolek. Despite the competition, Jansen initially played at left-back before playing in left-midfield for most of the season, due to Ostrzolek being preferred at left-back. However, by the end of 2014, Jansen was plagued by injuries. As the 2014–15 season progressed, Jansen's return was short-lived when he continued to suffer injuries. At the end of the 2014–15 season, Jansen had made 16 appearances and scored 2 goals in all competitions.

At the end of the 2014–15 season, Hamburg opted not to extend Jansen's contract.

=== Retirement ===
Being a free agent, Jansen could not take on a new club as he believed Hamburg was the only team for him. Many criticised his actions, believing he made a wrong decision as he announced his retirement from the game at age 29. Responding to criticism, Jansen stated that he was not a fan of the scenes behind the football business.

== International career ==
=== Youth team ===
Having previously played for the youth side, Jansen was called up by Germany under-21 national team for the first time in November 2004. He made his Germany U21 debut on 16 November 2004, where he made his first start and played 62 minutes before being substituted in a 1–1 draw against Poland. Jansen then scored his first Germany U21 goal on 16 February 2005 in a 4–0 win over Wales. Jansen went on to make four appearances and scored once for the Germany U21 side.

=== Senior team ===
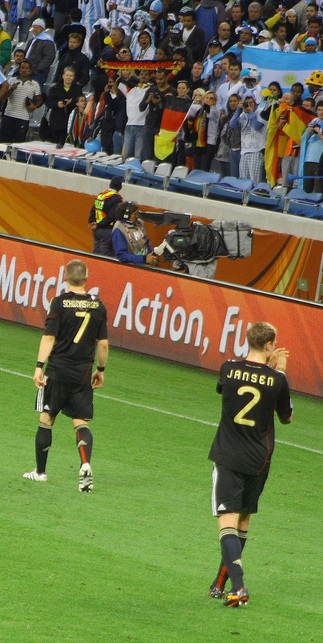
Jansen after beating Argentina in the quarter-final of the 2010 World Cup

In September 2005, Jansen was called by the senior side for the first time in a friendly match against South Africa and against Slovakia on 3 September 2005 in Bratislava. He made his debut in that match, coming on as a half-time substitute for Thomas Hitzlsperger as Germany lost 2–0. Jansen then played the whole match in the next match against South Africa on 7 September 2005, in a 4–2 win for the side.

After appearing in further internationals for Germany, Jansen was subsequently named in the final 23-man German squad for the 2006 FIFA World Cup. He initially started out as first-choice on the left with usual left back Philipp Lahm being moved to right back to accommodate him. After some below-par performances prior to the tournament, manager Jürgen Klinsmann benched him and put Lahm in at left back again. With Lahm in good form, Jansen was restricted to only one appearance throughout the tournament, Germany's bronze medal-winning match against Portugal.

Jansen eventually earned a recall for several UEFA Euro 2008 qualifiers, including the 6–0 hammering of San Marino in which he scored his first international goal. Despite fears of injury he sustained against Serbia in a friendly match on 31 May 2008, Jansen was nevertheless a part of Joachim Löw's squad for the main tournament. Jansen played his first match of the tournament, playing the full 90 minutes in the 2–0 win against first group opponent Poland. He was then benched in Germany's 2–1 loss in the second group stage match against Croatia, but suffered a shoulder injury. Jansen returned as a substitute against Portugal in the quarter-finals in a 3–2 win and did so again against Turkey in the semi-finals, a 3–2 win. In the final, Jansen came on as a second-half substitute for Lahm, as he played and defended for the remainder of the match, which saw Germany lose 1–0 against Spain.

Prior to the World Cup in South Africa, Jansen suffered an injury and manager Löw doubted that Jansen would make it to the Germany's squad. But in May 2010, Jansen was initially included in the provisional squad before being included for the final 23-man squad the following month. After appearing twice an unused substitute, with Holger Badstuber taking the left–back position, Jansen made his first World Cup appearance, coming on as a second-half substitute in a 1–0 win over Ghana. He then went on to make two more appearances as substitute in the matches against Argentina and Spain. He played in the starting line-up and scored in the 3–2 2010 World Cup third place win for Germany against Uruguay.

Germany's first competitive game after the World Cup in early September 2010, a 1–0 win in a Euro 2012 qualifying match against Belgium, was his next international appearance. In October 2010, he was called up for the games in the qualifiers against Turkey and Kazakhstan, but had to cancel due to injury. As a result, Jansen had not been called by the national for almost three years, including missing out on the Germany squad for Euro 2012. He later expressed disappointment for not being called up for the national side.

On 24 March 2013, Jansen again received an invitation for the Germany national team when he was re-nominated for the 2014 World Cup qualification match against Kazakhstan. On 26 March 2013, he appeared as a substitute in this game in stoppage time for Marco Reus. On 29 May 2013, Jansen made his first start in years and played the whole match when Germany won 4–2 against Ecuador. He played on 15 November 2013 in a friendly match at the San Siro in Milan against Italy, and four days later at 1–0 win in the friendly match at Wembley Stadium in London against England.

On 5 March 2014, Jansen played in a friendly match in the Mercedes-Benz Arena in Stuttgart against Chile in the starting XI; he was injured in the 28th minute and replaced by Marcel Schmelzer. On 8 May 2014, Jansen was nominated for the preliminary 2014 World Cup squad, although had a long injury break. However, six days later, on 14 May 2014, he was cut from the World Cup squad. Germany would go on and win the World Cup with Benedikt Höwedes playing on his position.

== Personal life ==
Jansen revealed that he has lactose and grain intolerance, refraining from eating foods that contain lactose.

Outside football, Jansen supports the "Hamburger Weg" project where he helps people who struggle in the city of Hamburg. At one point, Jansen once raised €1,000 for the "Hamburger Weg" project when he was a participant in a poker match. Jansen also said his father was a major influence in his life.

In February 2015, Jansen, along with five others, invested in the sports company called "Gymjunky".

== Post-retirement ==
Following his retirement, Jansen joined Sky Sport as a pundit.

=== Hamburger SV president ===
On 6 February 2018, Jansen was elected to the supervisory board of HSV Fußball AG. He was elected president of Hamburger SV on 19 January 2019, and became an ex officio member of the supervisory board, serving as its chairman from 2020 to 2021 and again from 2022 to 2023. Jansen was re-elected as club president in 2021 and remained in office until stepping down from the supervisory board in January 2024 following a change to the club's statutes.

== Career statistics ==
=== Club ===
Appearances and goals by club, season and competition
Club	Season	Bundesliga		DFB-Pokal		UEFA		Total	
Club	Season	App	Goals	App	Goals	App	Goals	App	Goals
Borussia Mönchengladbach	2004–05	18	1	0	0	–		18	1
Borussia Mönchengladbach	2005–06	32	3	1	0	–		33	3
Borussia Mönchengladbach	2006–07	23	1	1	0	–		24	1
Borussia Mönchengladbach	Total	73	5	2	0	0	0	75	5
Bayern Munich	2007–08	17	0	3	0	10	0	30	0
Hamburger SV	2008–09	25	3	4	1	10	1	39	5
Hamburger SV	2009–10	18	6	1	1	8	3	27	10
Hamburger SV	2010–11	16	2	1	0	–		17	2
Hamburger SV	2011–12	29	5	2	0	–		31	5
Hamburger SV	2012–13	28	1	1	0	–		29	1
Hamburger SV	2013–14	21	1	4	0	–		25	1
Hamburger SV	2014–15	15	2	1	0	–		16	2
Hamburger SV	Total	152	20	14	2	18	4	184	26
Hamburger SV III	2017–18	4	0	–		–		4	0
Hamburger SV III	2018–19	0	0	–		–		0	0
Hamburger SV III	2019–20	20	14	–		–		20	14
Hamburger SV III	2020–21	2	0	–		–		2	0
Hamburger SV III	Total	26	14	0	0	0	0	26	14
Career total		268	39	19	2	28	4	312	45

=== International ===
Scores and results list Germany's goal tally first, score column indicates score after each Jansen goal.

List of international goals scored by Marcell Jansen
No.	Date	Venue	Opponent	Score	Result	Competition	Ref.
1	2 June 2007	Frankenstadion, Nuremberg, Germany	San Marino	2–0	6–0	Euro 2008 Q	
2	28 March 2009	Zentralstadion, Leipzig, Germany	Liechtenstein	2–0	4–0	2010 WCQ	
3	10 July 2010	Nelson Mandela Bay Stadium, Port Elizabeth, South Africa	Uruguay	2–2	3–2	2010 FIFA World Cup	

== Honours ==
Bayern Munich

- Bundesliga: 2007–08
- DFB-Pokal: 2007–08
- DFL-Ligapokal: 2007

Germany

- FIFA World Cup third place: 2006, 2010
- UEFA European Championship runner-up: 2008

Orders

- Silbernes Lorbeerblatt: 2006, 2010
