= Kevin Schöneberg =

German footballer

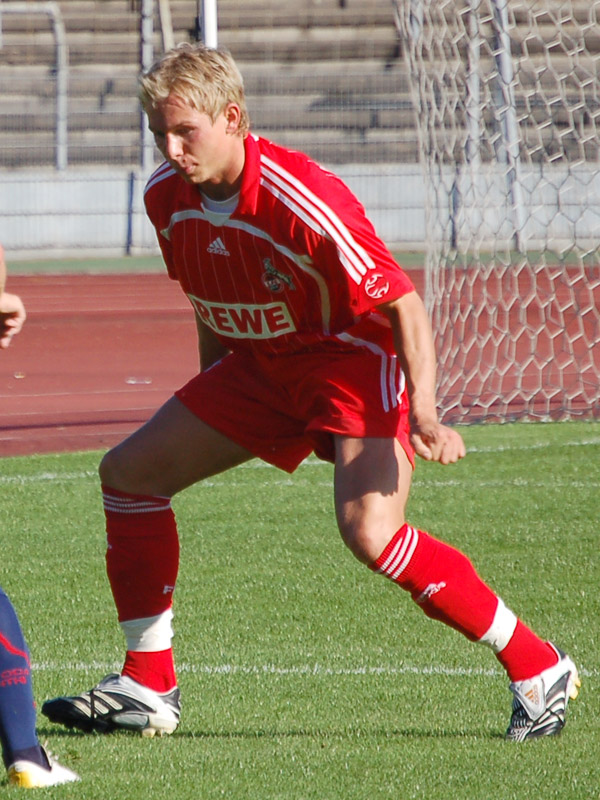
- Schöneberg with 1. FC Köln

Personal information
- Date of birth: 24 August 1985 (age 41)
- Place of birth: Cologne, West Germany
- Height: 1.78 m (5 ft 10 in)
- Position: Defender

Youth career
- –1993: BC Bliesheim
- 1993–2004: 1. FC Köln

Senior career*
Years	Team	Apps	(Gls)
2004–2006	1. FC Köln II	53	(0)
2007–2008	1. FC Köln	20	(0)
2009–2010	Hansa Rostock	48	(1)
2010	Arminia Bielefeld	9	(0)
2011	VfL Osnabrück	8	(0)
2011–2012	Viktoria Köln	32	(1)
2012–2016	Preußen Münster	82	(1)
2016–2017	BSV Schwarz-Weiß Rehden	16	(0)
Total		268	(3)

International career
	Germany U-20	6	(0)
- * Club domestic league appearances and goals

Kevin Schöneberg (born 24 August 1985) is a German former professional footballer who played as a defender.

== Career ==
Born in Cologne, Schöneberg made his professional debut for hometown club 1. FC Köln in the 2006–07 season in the 2. Bundesliga. On 27 January 2009, he left Cologne to join Hansa Rostock. However, Schöneberg left Hansa Rostock for Arminia Bielefeld on 4 October 2010. After half a year in Bielefeld, he transferred to VfL Osnabrück on the last day of the winter transfer window in January 2011. In April 2011 he, along with Björn Lindemann, was suspended by VfL Osnabrück for appearing to training under the influence of alcohol.

He was released on 30 June 2011 and subsequently signed for Viktoria Köln.

== Personal life ==
In July 2017, Schöneberg was playing for amateur side Westfalia Kinderhaus.
