= Hamburger SV III =

- Full name: Hamburger Sport-Verein III e.V.
- Nickname: HSV-III
- Founded: 29 September 1887
- Ground: Paul-Hauenschild-Sportplätze Kura 2
- Capacity: 1,000
- Manager: Stefan Gehrke
- League: Landesliga Hammonia (VI)
- 2024–25: Oberliga Hamburg, 18th of 18 (relegated)

Hamburger SV III, also known as Hamburger SV Amateure, is the second reserve team of Hamburger SV, a professional football club based in Hamburg, Germany. Established to develop young talents and provide a pathway to the senior team, Hamburger SV III competes in Landesliga Hammonia.

== History ==
Hamburger SV III was founded in 1887 as the second reserve team of Hamburger SV. The team's primary objective is to nurture promising young players and help them progress to the first team. Throughout its history, Hamburger SV III has played a crucial role in the club's youth development efforts.

== League participation ==
Hamburger SV III competes in the Landesliga Hammonia, which is part of the German football league system.

== Players ==
Note: Flags indicate national team as defined under FIFA eligibility rules; some limited exceptions apply. Players may hold more than one non-FIFA nationality.

No.	Pos.	Nation	Player
1	GK	GUA	José Aguirre
12	GK	GER	Youssef Mountassir
22	GK	GER	Patrick Tiedje
27	CF	GER	Batuhan Evren
22	GK	GER	Bjarne Brechlin
4	CB	GER	Michael Ulbricht
9	CB	GER	Kevin Herbermann
19	CB	GER	Niel Lüthje
25	CB	GER	Nick Denkewitz
5	LB	GER	Marcell Jansen
2	RB	GER	Haci Gündogan
17	RB	GER	Timon Flach
20	RB	GER	Ismaila Jobe
6	DM	GER	Artur Krüger
8	MF	GER	Stefan Gehrke
26	MF	IRN	Amir Bonjar
30	MF	GER	Timon Engelmann
7	CM	GER	Martin Fedai
14	CM	GER	Okan Özer Subay
23	RM	GER	Dominik Jordan
21	AM	GER	Marcel Perz
10	LW	IRN	Sepehr Nikroo
