= Youssef Mohamad (footballer, born 1980) =

Lebanese footballer (born 1980)

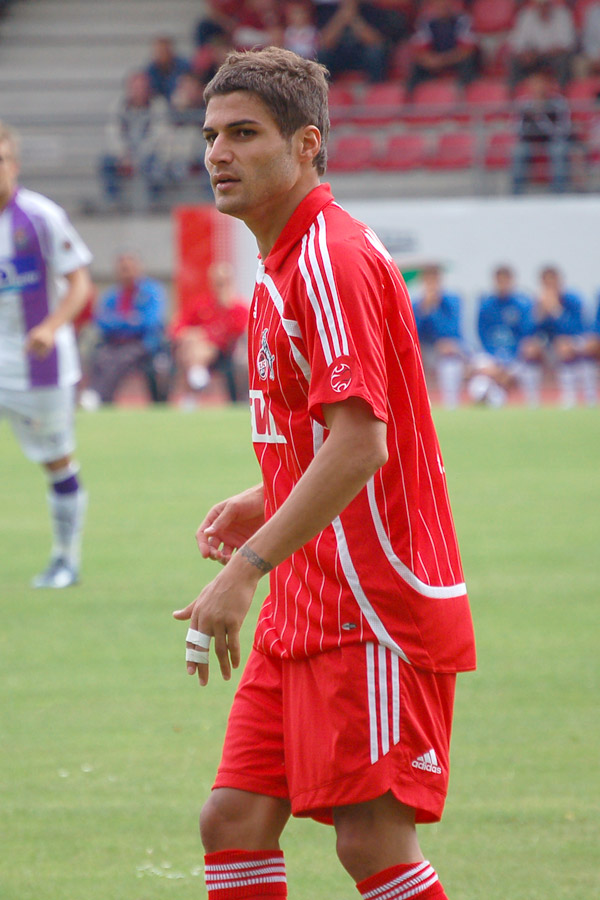
- Mohamad with 1. FC Köln in 2007

Personal information
- Full name: Youssef Wassef Mohamad
- Date of birth: 1 July 1980 (age 46)
- Place of birth: Ayta al-Jabal, Lebanon
- Height: 1.82 m (6 ft 0 in)
- Position: Defender

Team information
- Current team: Lebanon (assistant coach)

Youth career
- Safa

Senior career*
Years	Team	Apps	(Gls)
1999–2002	Safa	25+	(4)
2002–2004	Olympic Beirut		(4)
2004–2007	SC Freiburg	87	(9)
2007–2011	1. FC Köln	120	(10)
2011–2013	Al-Ahli	35	(5)
2016	Nejmeh	0	(0)
Total		267+	(32)

International career
2002	Lebanon U23		
1999–2016	Lebanon	81	(3)

Managerial career
- 2016–2022: Lebanon (technical advisor)
- 2022–: Lebanon (assistant)
- * Club domestic league appearances and goals

Youssef Wassef Mohamad (Arabic: يوسف واصف محمد; born 1 July 1980), also known as Dodo (Arabic: دودو), is a Lebanese former professional footballer who is assistant coach of the Lebanon national team.

Mohamad is one of the most successful players in the history of Lebanese football, captaining 1. FC Köln during his spell with the club in the Bundesliga, as well as the Lebanon national team.

== Club career ==
=== Safa ===
Mohamad began his career at Lebanese Premier League side Safa, signing to the first-team from the youth team. He got promoted to the first team in 1999 and played for three years.

=== Olympic Beirut ===
In summer 2002, he transferred to Olympic Beirut. Mohamad went on to win the domestic double (Lebanese Premier League and Lebanese FA Cup) in the 2002–03 season.

=== Freiburg ===
Mohamad joined Bundesliga side SC Freiburg in 2004, at the recommendation of his international teammate, Roda Antar. He scored his first goals, a brace, in a 3–3 draw against Greuther Fürth on 22 September 2006. Although Freiburg were relegated to the 2. Bundesliga, Mohamad remained there until his transfer to 1. FC Köln in 2007.

=== 1. FC Köln ===
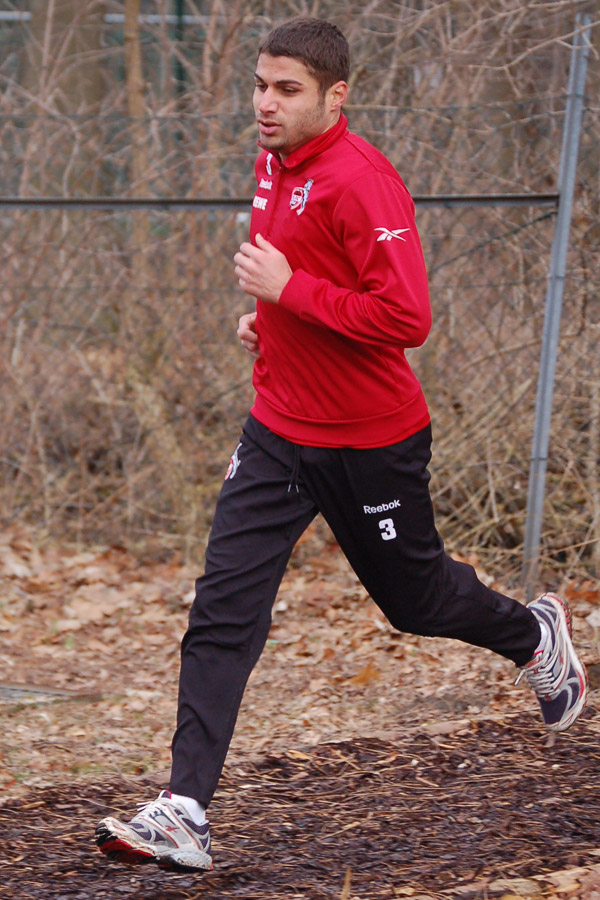
Mohamad with 1. FC Köln in 2009

Mohamad signed for Köln on 17 July 2007.

In the 2009–10 season, he scored against Borussia Dortmund in a last-minute 3–2 defeat; Mohamad equalized the score in the 88th minute with a right footed goal. Mohamad received three yellow cards throughout the season.

In January 2010, Köln coach Zvonimir Soldo announced that Mohamad would be the captain of the club. He became the third Arab player to captain a Bundesliga club, after Egyptian player Hany Ramzy and Tunisian player Zoubeir Baya.

It took him 92 seconds to receive a red card on the opening day of the 2010–11 season on 21 August 2010, a 3–1 defeat to 1. FC Kaiserslautern; it was the fastest red card in Bundesliga history.

=== Al-Ahli ===
In August 2011, UAE Pro League side Al-Ahli announced the signing of Mohamad on a two-year deal.

=== Nejmeh ===
In September 2016, Mohamad returned to Lebanon, signing with Nejmeh. However he did not manage a single appearance as he was ruled out for injury; he subsequently retired from football in September of the same year.

== International career ==
On 16 August 1999, Mohamad debuted for Lebanon in the 1999 Pan Arab Games. On 25 June 2000, Mohamad scored a free kick, his first international goal, in a 3–1 home victory against Kuwait.

In 2000, aged 20, Mohamad was selected to represent Lebanon at the 2000 AFC Asian Cup. On 12 October, he played the full 90 minutes in Lebanon's opening 4–0 loss against Iran. On 15 October, he was substituted onto the field in the 89th minute for Abbas Chahrour in a 2–2 draw against Iraq. However, he didn't take part in Lebanon's 1–1 draw with Thailand on 18 October.

In 2007, Mohamad reportedly had a disagreement with Lebanon's assistant coach Adnan Al Sharqi, where he had intensely criticized the Lebanese Football Association (LFA) and the national team coach. He was suspended by the LFA and would be allowed to return on the condition that he would apologize to the LFA and its national team coach.

Prior to the start of the third round of qualification for the 2014 FIFA World Cup game against South Korea and the United Arab Emirates in September 2011, it was reported that Mohamad had traveled to Goyang, South Korea to join the squad for the match.

Mohamad announced his retirement from international football in April 2016.

== Managerial career ==
After retiring from football, in December 2016 Mohamad took the role of technical advisor of the Lebanon national team. He became assistant coach of the national team in 2022.

== Career statistics ==
=== Club ===
Appearances and goals by club, season and competition
Club	Season	League		
Club	Season	Division	Apps	Goals
Safa	1999–00	Lebanese Premier League		1
Safa	2000–01	Lebanese Premier League	11	2
Safa	2001–02	Lebanese Premier League	14	1
Safa	Total		25+	4
Olympic Beirut	2002–03	Lebanese Premier League		0
Olympic Beirut	2003–04	Lebanese Premier League		4
Olympic Beirut	Total			4
SC Freiburg	2004–05	Bundesliga	29	0
SC Freiburg	2005–06	2. Bundesliga	27	1
SC Freiburg	2006–07	2. Bundesliga	31	8
SC Freiburg	Total		87	9
1. FC Köln	2007–08	2. Bundesliga	31	5
1. FC Köln	2008–09	Bundesliga	30	1
1. FC Köln	2009–10	Bundesliga	31	2
1. FC Köln	2010–11	Bundesliga	28	2
1. FC Köln	Total		120	10
Al-Ahli	2011–12	UAE Pro League	13	2
Al-Ahli	2012–13	UAE Pro League	22	3
Al-Ahli	2013–14	UAE Pro League	0	0
Al-Ahli	Total		35	5
Nejmeh	2016–17	Lebanese Premier League	0	0
Career total			267+	32+

=== International ===
Scores and results list Lebanon's goal tally first, score column indicates score after each Mohamad goal.

List of international goals scored by Youssef Mohamad
No.	Date	Venue	Opponent	Score	Result	Competition
1	25 June 2000	Tripoli Municipal Stadium, Tripoli, Lebanon	Kuwait	3–1	3–1	Friendly
2	19 September 2003	Bahrain National Stadium, Riffa, Bahrain	Bahrain	2–4	3–4	Friendly
3	12 November 2015	Saida Municipal Stadium, Sidon, Lebanon	Laos	1–0	7–0	2018 FIFA World Cup qualification

== Honours ==
Olympic Beirut

- Lebanese Premier League: 2002–03
- Lebanese FA Cup: 2002–03

Al-Ahli

- UAE League Cup: 2011–12
- UAE President's Cup: 2012–13

Individual

- IFFHS All-time Lebanon Men's Dream Team
- Lebanese Premier League Team of the Season: 2002–03, 2003–04

== See also ==
- List of Lebanon international footballers
