= Fabrice Ehret =

French footballer (born 1979)

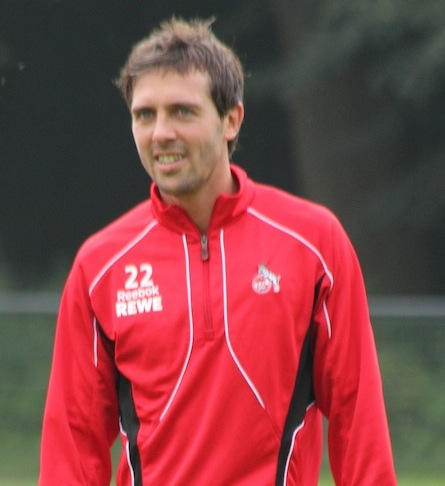

Personal information
- Date of birth: 28 September 1979 (age 47)
- Place of birth: Lugano, Switzerland
- Height: 1.83 m (6 ft 0 in)
- Position: Left midfielder

Youth career
- 1985–1989: Petit-Landau
- 1989–1997: Mulhouse

Senior career*
Years	Team	Apps	(Gls)
1997–1998	Mulhouse	5	(2)
1998–2004	Strasbourg	124	(11)
2004–2006	Anderlecht	7	(0)
2006	Aarau	12	(0)
2006–2011	1. FC Köln	129	(4)
2011–2014	Evian	42	(2)
2012–2014	Evian B	8	(1)
2014–2015	Nancy	1	(0)
2014	Nancy B	2	(0)
Total		230	(20)

International career
2000–2001	France U21	10	(0)
- * Club domestic league appearances and goals

Fabrice Ehret (born 28 September 1979) is a former footballer who played as a left midfielder. Born in Switzerland, he represented France at youth level. Former Anderlecht coach Hugo Broos described him as "a player who can control the whole left flank and also is strong in attack".
