= Tobias Nickenig =

German footballer

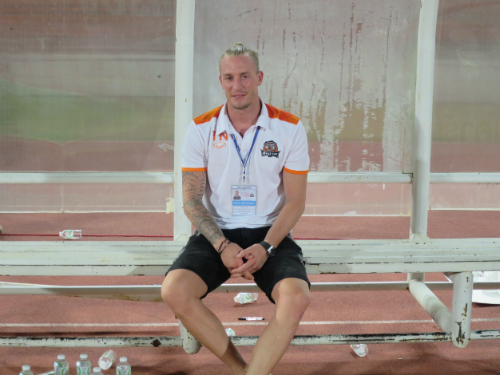
- Nickenig in 2016

Personal information
- Date of birth: 1 August 1984 (age 42)
- Place of birth: Neuwied, West Germany
- Height: 1.90 m (6 ft 3 in)
- Position: Defender

Youth career
- –1997: BSV Weißenthurm
- 1997–2000: SG Andernach
- 2000–2003: 1. FC Köln

Senior career*
| Years | Team | Apps | (Gls) |
| 2003–2006 | 1. FC Köln II | 61 | (7) |
| 2006–2007 | → Sportfreunde Siegen (loan) | 10 | (0) |
| 2007–2008 | 1. FC Köln | 11 | (0) |
| 2009 | FC Vaduz | 10 | (1) |
| 2009–2011 | VfL Osnabrück | 48 | (1) |
| 2011–2012 | Orduspor | 7 | (0) |
| 2012–2014 | Erzgebirge Aue | 35 | (2) |
| Total | | 182 | (11) |
- * Club domestic league appearances and goals

Tobias Nickenig (born 1 August 1984) is a German former professional footballer who played as a defender.

== Career ==
=== 1. FC Köln ===
Born in Neuwied, Nickenig came through the 1. FC Köln youth system. In the 2005–06 season, he was called up for the first team of 1. FC Köln and he was eventually loaned out to Sportfreunde Siegen in the winter transfer window. After he returned to 1.FC Köln in summer 2007 he was starting for Köln in the first 10 games of the season 2007–08 until a long time injury stopped him – 2 groin operations – and he was out for almost nine months. This season the club finished 1st place and got promoted to the Bundesliga.

He gave his debut in the Bundesliga on 17 December 2008 before he left Köln on 1 January 2009 moving to Liechtenstein-based club FC Vaduz of the Swiss Super League, coached by Pierre Littbarski, former world cup winner 1990.

=== VfL Osnabrück ===
After his Vaduz contract ended on 1 July 2009 he signed a one-year contract with VfL Osnabrück on 9 July 2009. In Osnabrück he became one of the outstanding players and an important part of the team that achieved promotion to 2. Bundesliga in 2010.

=== Later years ===
After his second year in Osnabrück and a couple of injuries he left the club in 2011 and signed with Turkish side Orduspor which was playing in Süper Lig. There he just had 7 appearances in the first half of the season and after not getting paid he terminated his contract in April 2012.

In July 2012 he signed with German 2. Bundesliga club FC Erzgebirge Aue. There, he again became one of the most important players in the following two seasons and helped the club avoid relegation. On 17 April 2014, he played his last game as a professional footballer in the derby against Dynamo Dresden. In summer 2014, he was one of three players to be released by the club.

He had to retire aged 29 due to knee problems after several operations.

== Post-playing retirement ==
In 2016, Nickenig became sporting director of Thai club Nakhon Ratchasima.
