= Joris Mathijsen =

Dutch association football player (born 1980)

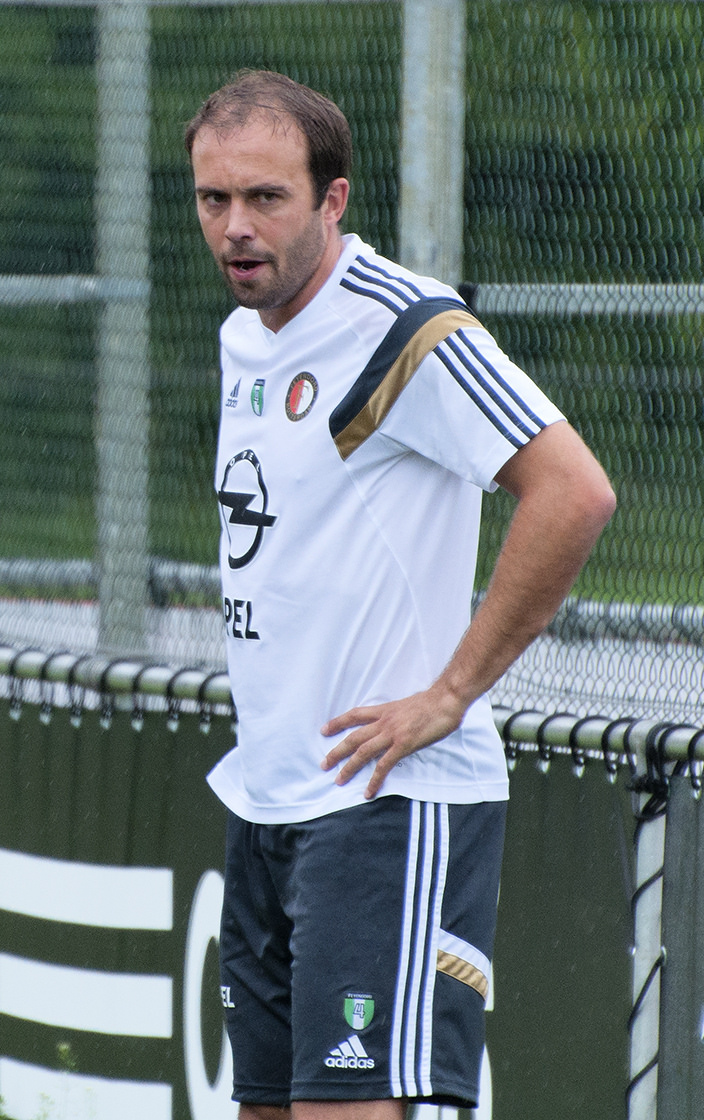
- Mathijsen training with Feyenoord in 2014

Personal information
- Full name: Joris Mathijsen
- Date of birth: 5 April 1980 (age 46)
- Place of birth: Goirle, Netherlands
- Height: 1.83 m (6 ft 0 in)
- Position: Centre-back

Youth career
- 1986–1989: VOAB
- 1989–1998: Willem II

Senior career*
Years	Team	Apps	(Gls)
1998–2004	Willem II	127	(6)
2004–2006	AZ	52	(2)
2006–2011	Hamburger SV	145	(6)
2011–2012	Málaga	28	(0)
2012–2015	Feyenoord	57	(1)
Total		409	(15)

International career
2004–2012	Netherlands	84	(3)
Medal record
Representing Netherlands
Men's football
FIFA World Cup
Runner-up	2010 South Africa	Team
- * Club domestic league appearances and goals

Joris Mathijsen (born 5 April 1980) is a Dutch former professional footballer who played as a centre-back. He is the director of football at Willem II.

== Club career ==
Mathijsen started his football career at SV VOAB in Goirle after he visited a training session of a friend as a young boy. At the age of nine, he left this club and came through the youth system of Willem II. He was promoted to the first team for the 1998–99 season, making his debut on 27 February 1999 in a match against FC Utrecht. After six seasons at Willem II, he was sold by manager Co Adriaanse to AZ. However, he endured a harder time breaking into the first team with AZ and his case was not helped by injuries.

After finishing as runners-up in the Eredivisie in 2006, Mathijsen opted to transfer to German Bundesliga side Hamburger SV for €6 million, where he teamed up with fellow Dutchmen Rafael van der Vaart and Nigel de Jong. He scored Hamburg's 2,500th Bundesliga goal (his first for the club) on 20 October 2007 against VfB Stuttgart.

In November 2008, Mathijsen signed a new contract extension, tying him to Hamburg until the summer of 2012. In mid-June 2011, however, he signed a two-year contract with Spanish La Liga side Málaga.

In the summer of 2012, it became apparent that Málaga was willing to let Mathijsen transfer to another club, prompting several Dutch sides to show interest, including Feyenoord and Ajax; on 10 August, Mathijsen signed with the former.

== International career ==
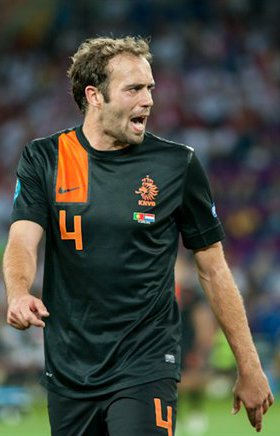
Mathijsen playing for the Netherlands at Euro 2012

On 17 November 2004, Mathijsen made his international debut for the Netherlands against Andorra in a 3–0 away win.

Since his international debut, Mathijsen became a mainstay figure in the national team, especially after impressing with Hamburger SV. He was usually positioned as left central defender, because of his strong left-foot. He was called up to the Dutch squad for UEFA Euro 2008 in Austria and Switzerland. Initially in danger of losing his spot to Wilfred Bouma, he followed it up with a decent enough performance at the Euro 2008 and remained first-choice.

Mathijsen was ever present for Oranje during the 2010 FIFA World Cup qualifying. He played more minutes than any other player in the Dutch squad and played a key role in their record of having conceded the fewest goals in their qualifying group.

Mathijsen was part of the Dutch team for the 2010 World Cup, managed by Bert van Marwijk. The player was in the starting line-up for their first match in the competition, a 2–0 victory over Denmark, and started in all their matches on the way to the final.

== Career statistics ==
Appearances and goals by club, season and competition
Club	Season	League			Cup (Note: Includes KNVB Cup, DFB-Pokal, Copa del Rey)		Continental (Note: Includes UEFA Champions League and UEFA Europa League)		Other		Total	
Club	Season	Division	Apps	Goals	Apps	Goals	Apps	Goals	Apps	Goals	Apps	Goals
Willem II	1999–2000	Eredivisie	7	0	0	0	0	0	–		7	0
Willem II	2000–01	Eredivisie	22	1	2	0	–		–		24	1
Willem II	2001–02	Eredivisie	31	1	2	1	–		–		33	2
Willem II	2002–03	Eredivisie	34	1	2	0	6	0	–		42	1
Willem II	2003–04	Eredivisie	32	3	5	0	2	0	–		39	3
Willem II	Total		126	6	11	1	8	0	0	0	145	7
AZ	2004–05	Eredivisie	25	1	1	0	10	3	–		36	4
AZ	2005–06	Eredivisie	25	0	3	0	5	0	2 (Note: Appearances in Eredivisie playoffs)	0	35	0
AZ	2006–07	Eredivisie	1	1	0	0	0	0	0	0	1	1
AZ	Total		51	2	4	0	15	3	2	0	72	5
Hamburger SV	2006–07	Bundesliga	32	0	0	0	6	0	–		38	0
Hamburger SV	2007–08	Bundesliga	31	1	0	0	8	0	–		39	1
Hamburger SV	2008–09	Bundesliga	33	2	0	0	12	1	–		45	3
Hamburger SV	2009–10	Bundesliga	33	1	0	0	14	1	–		47	2
Hamburger SV	2010–11	Bundesliga	19	2	0	0	–		–		19	2
Hamburger SV	Total		148	6	0	0	40	2	–		188	8
Málaga	2011–12	La Liga	28	0	2	0	–		–		28	0
Feyenoord	2012–13	Eredivisie	29	0	3	0	2	0	–		34	0
Feyenoord	2013–14	Eredivisie	20	1	4	0	1	0	–		25	1
Feyenoord	2014–15	Eredivisie	8	0	0	0	5	0	0	0	13	0
Feyenoord	Total		57	1	7	0	8	0	0	0	72	1
Career total			410	15	24	1	71	5	2	0	507	21

=== International ===
Appearances and goals by national team and year
National team	Year	Apps	Goals
Netherlands	2004	1	0
Netherlands	2005	4	0
Netherlands	2006	12	1
Netherlands	2007	10	1
Netherlands	2008	14	1
Netherlands	2009	11	0
Netherlands	2010	15	0
Netherlands	2011	11	0
Netherlands	2012	6	0
Total		84	3

Scores and results list Netherlands' goal tally first, score column indicates score after each Mathijsen goal.

List of international goals scored by Joris Mathijsen
No.	Date	Venue	Opponent	Score	Result	Competition
1	2 September 2006	Stade Josy Barthel, Luxembourg, Luxembourg	Luxembourg	1–0	1–0	Euro 2008 qualifying
2	7 February 2007	Amsterdam Arena, Amsterdam, Netherlands	Russia	3–1	4–1	Friendly
3	11 October 2008	De Kuip, Rotterdam, Netherlands	Iceland	1–0	2–0	2010 World Cup qualification
