= Carsten Cullmann =

German footballer and manager

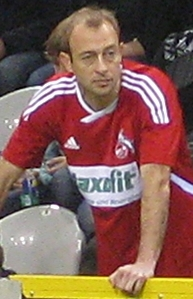
- Cullmann in 2011

Personal information
- Date of birth: 5 March 1976 (age 50)
- Place of birth: Cologne, West Germany
- Height: 1.87 m (6 ft 2 in)
- Position: Defender

Team information
- Current team: 1. FC Köln (youth)

Youth career
- –1994: SpVgg Porz 1919

Senior career*
Years	Team	Apps	(Gls)
1994–1996	SpVgg Porz 1919		
1996–2011	1. FC Köln II	77	(4)
1998–2011	1. FC Köln	192	(11)

Managerial career
- XXXX: 1. FC Köln (youth)
- 2012: 1. FC Köln II (assistant)
- 2013: 1. FC Köln II (assistant)
- 2014–: 1. FC Köln (youth)
- * Club domestic league appearances and goals

Carsten Cullmann (born 5 March 1976) is a German football manager and former player who played most of his career as a defender for 1. FC Köln.

== Career ==
In his youth, Cullmann played for Sportvereinigung Porz 1919 e.V. till he joined 1. FC Köln 1996–97 at the age of 20.

After two years with the amateurs, he was given his Bundesliga debut during the 1998–99 season. After many years and 192 games for Cologne's first squad, he last functioned as a "stand by", playing for the second squad in the fourth league and for the first team, should they require his service.

Cullmann is the son of former German international and 1. FC Köln player Bernd Cullmann.
