= Günter Perl =

German football referee

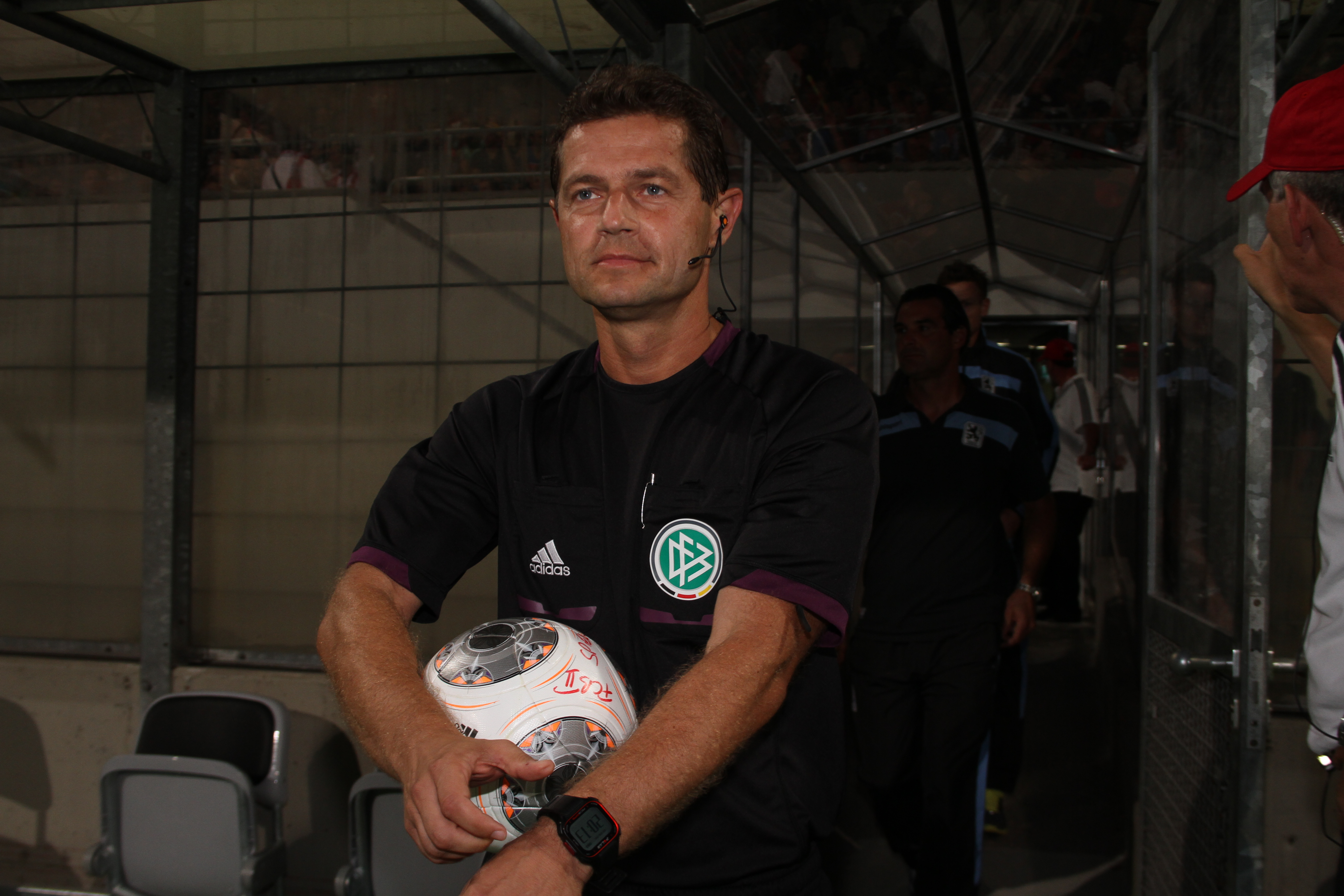
- Perl in 2014
- Born: 23 December 1969 (age 56)
- Other occupation: Wholesale and foreign trade merchant

Domestic
Years	League	Role
1996–2017	DFB	Referee
1998–2017	2. Bundesliga	Referee
2005–2017	Bundesliga	Referee

Günter Perl (born 23 December 1969) is a former German football referee who is based in Pullach. He refereed for Münchener SpVgg of the Bavarian Football Association.

== Refereeing career ==
Perl was a referee of the club Münchener SpVgg, and officiated on the DFB level from 1996. Since 1998 he officiated 2. Bundesliga matches, and was appointed as a Bundesliga referee in 2005. He made his Bundesliga debut on 13 August 2005 in the match between 1. FC Kaiserslautern and MSV Duisburg.

Perl retired from officiating in 2017 because he reached the age limit for German referees, which is 47. His final Bundesliga match officiated was between Borussia Dortmund and Werder Bremen.

== Personal life ==
Perl, a full-time wholesale and foreign trade merchant, lives in the Bavarian village of Pullach. He is married and has two sons.
