= Michael Niedrig =

German footballer

Personal information
- Date of birth: 12 January 1980 (age 46)
- Place of birth: Cologne, West Germany
- Height: 1.83 m (6 ft 0 in)
- Position: Midfielder

Youth career
- 1984–1999: FC Remscheid
- 1999–2002: 1. FC Köln

Senior career*
Years	Team	Apps	(Gls)
2002–2005	1. FC Köln II	67	(6)
2003–2005	1. FC Köln	3	(0)
2005–2007	Holstein Kiel	58	(5)
2007–2011	1. FC Köln	0	(0)
2007–2011	1. FC Köln II	91	(6)
- * Club domestic league appearances and goals

Michael Niedrig (born 12 January 1980) is a German former footballer. He made his professional debut for 1. FC Köln in the 2003–04 season.
