= Wilfried Sanou =

Burkinabé footballer (born 1984)

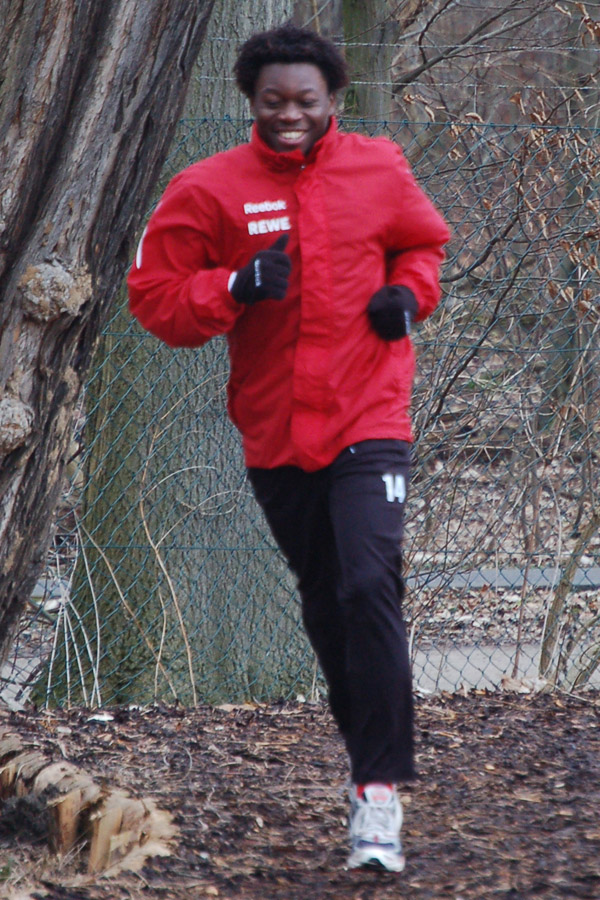
- Sanou in training in 2009

Personal information
- Date of birth: 16 March 1984 (age 42)
- Place of birth: Bobo-Dioulasso, Upper Volta
- Height: 1.65 m (5 ft 5 in)
- Positions: Winger; striker

Youth career
- 2000–2001: Planète Champion

Senior career*
Years	Team	Apps	(Gls)
2001–2002	Wattens	0	(0)
2002	→ Tirol Innsbruck (loan)	5	(0)
2002–2003	Sion	26	(10)
2003–2008	SC Freiburg	97	(9)
2008–2011	1. FC Köln	24	(2)
2010	→ Urawa Reds (loan)	26	(2)
2012–2013	Kyoto Sanga	13	(2)
Total		191	(25)

International career
2001–2014	Burkina Faso	26	(4)
Medal record
Representing Burkina Faso
Africa Cup of Nations
Runner-up	2013 South Africa
- * Club domestic league appearances and goals

Wilfried Sanou (born 16 March 1984) is a Burkinabé former professional footballer who played as a winger or striker.

He started his career with Planète Champion in his home country before moving to Austria where he played for Wattens and Tirol Innsbruck. Following a stint at Swiss club Sion he spent many years in Germany's Bundesliga and 2. Bundesliga with SC Freiburg and 1. FC Köln. He ended his career in Japan with Urawa Red Diamonds and Kyoto Sanga FC.

At international level, Sanou represented the Burkina Faso national team scoring four goals in 25 matches.

== Career ==
=== Early career ===
Sanou was born in Bobo-Dioulasso.

=== SC Freiburg ===
In SC Freiburg's 2007–08 2. Bundesliga Sanou tore his cruciate ligament on matchday 8 against Erzgebirge Aue which kept him out of action for the rest of the season and limited him to six appearances. With his contract running out at the end of the season, Freiburg were unable to agree a contract extension with Sanou. In his time at the club, he scored five goals in 46 Bundesliga appearances and four goals in 51 2. Bundesliga appearances.

=== 1. FC Köln ===
In May 2008, 1. FC Köln, newly promoted to the Bundesliga, announced they had agreed a two-year contract Sanou who would arrive on a free transfer.
