= Adil Chihi =

Moroccan footballer (born 1988)

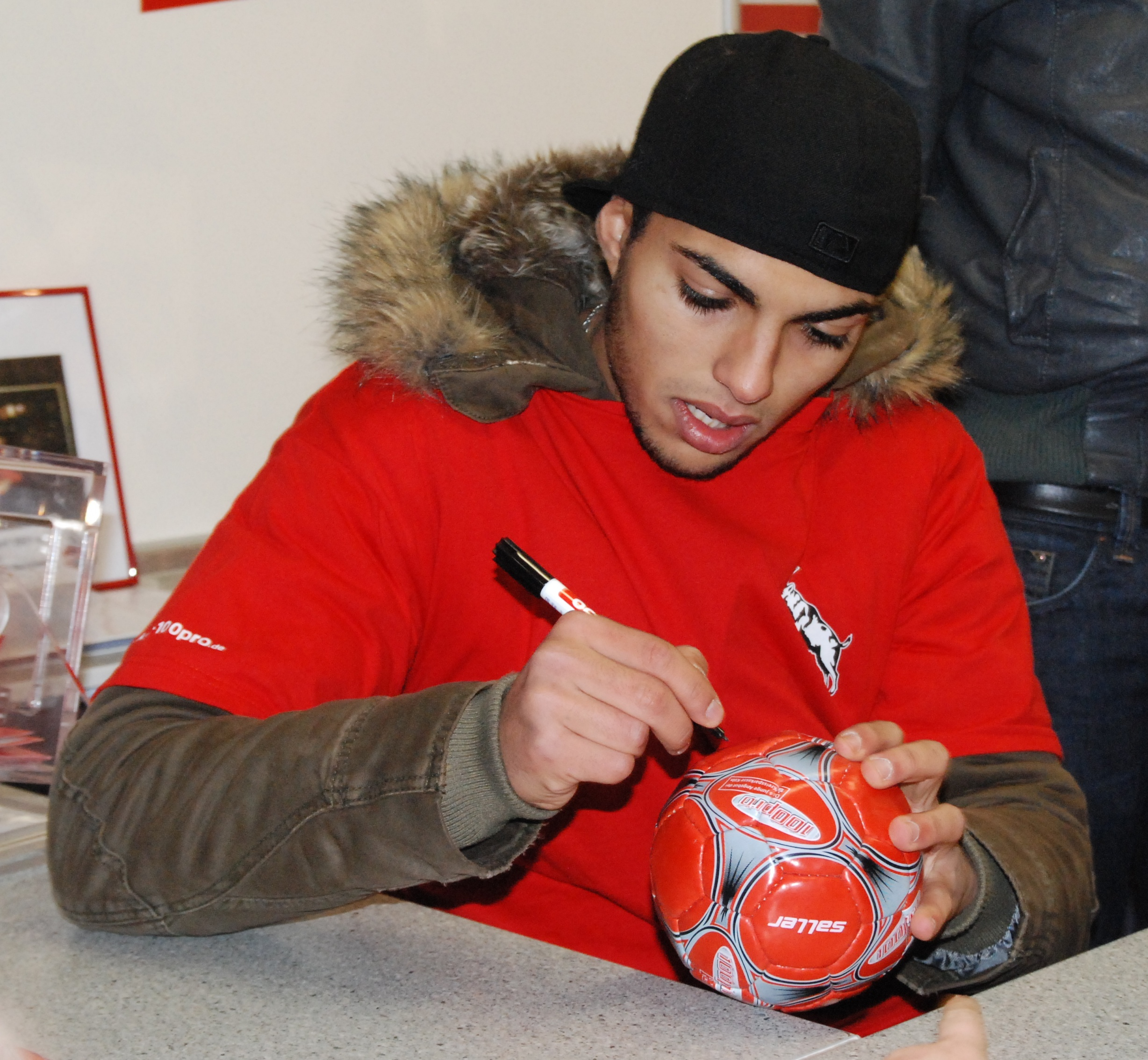
- Chihi in 2009

Personal information
- Date of birth: 21 February 1988 (age 38)
- Place of birth: Düsseldorf, West Germany
- Height: 1.83 m (6 ft 0 in)
- Position: Midfielder

Youth career
- 1993–1995: FC Tannenhof
- 1995–2000: Düsseldorfer SV 04
- 2000–2004: Fortuna Düsseldorf
- 2004–2006: 1. FC Köln

Senior career*
Years	Team	Apps	(Gls)
2005–2014	1. FC Köln	130	(20)
2005–2014	1. FC Köln II	22	(2)
2014–2015	Fulham	1	(0)
2016	Esteghlal	5	(0)
2016–2017	FSV Frankfurt	6	(0)
2017	IR Tanger	3	(0)
Total		168	(22)

International career
2008	Morocco	1	(0)
- * Club domestic league appearances and goals

Adil Chihi (Arabic: عادل شيحي; born 21 February 1988) is a professional footballer who most recently played as a midfielder for IR Tanger. Born in Germany, he represented Morocco at international level.

== Club career ==
On 23 July 2014, Chihi joined English side Fulham on a free transfer to play in the Championship.

On 27 February 2016, Chihi signed a contract with Persian Gulf Pro League club Esteghlal until the end of the season. He was assigned the shirt number 23 by the club.

== International career ==
Chihi made his first appearance for the Morocco national team in the friendly match against Benin on 20 August 2008.

== Honours ==
1. FC Köln

- 2 Bundesliga: 2013–14
