= 2010–11 1. FC Köln season =

1. FC Köln
2010–11 season
- Manager: Zvonimir Soldo (until 24 October 2010); Frank Schaefer (from 25 October 2010 to 27 April 2011); Volker Finke (from 27 April 2011)
- Stadium: RheinEnergieStadion
- Bundesliga: 10th
- DFB-Pokal: Round of 16
- Top goalscorer: League: Milivoje Novaković (17); All: Milivoje Novaković (19)
- Biggest win: 4–0 v Hannover 96 (Home, 11 March 2011, Bundesliga)
- Biggest defeat: 0–4 v Borussia Mönchengladbach (Home, 13 November 2010, Bundesliga); 2–6 v Hamburger SV (Away, 19 March 2011, Bundesliga); 1–5 v Borussia Mönchengladbach (Away, 10 April 2011, Bundesliga)
Home colours	Away colours	Third colours

The 2010–11 season was 1. FC Köln's 3rd consecutive season in the Bundesliga. In addition to the domestic league, the club participated in that season's editions of the DFB-Pokal.

After a poor start to the Bundesliga season, manager Zvonimir Soldo was dismissed on 24 October 2010, while assistant manager Michael Henke also left his position on the same day. One day later, Frank Schaefer, previously manager of the club's reserve team, was appointed manager, with Dirk Lottner joining the first-team staff as assistant manager at the same time. Schaefer remained in charge until 27 April 2011, when he resigned with the club still involved in the relegation battle, citing the need for a new impulse, and was replaced the same day by sporting director Volker Finke, who led the team for the remainder of the season.

== Squad ==
As of 6 March 2011

Note: Flags indicate national team as defined under FIFA eligibility rules; some limited exceptions apply. Players may hold more than one non-FIFA nationality.

No.	Pos.	Nation	Player
1	GK	GER	Michael Rensing
2	DF	SVN	Mišo Brečko
3	DF	LBN	Youssef Mohamad
4	DF	GER	Christian Eichner
5	MF	GER	Martin Lanig
6	MF	GER	Taner Yalçın
7	FW	GER	Sebastian Freis
8	MF	POR	Petit
10	FW	GER	Lukas Podolski
11	FW	SVN	Milivoje Novaković
12	DF	BRA	Andrezinho
13	MF	BFA	Wilfried Sanou
14	FW	ROU	Alexandru Ioniță
15	MF	POL	Sławomir Peszko
16	DF	GER	Christopher Schorch
17	MF	GER	Kevin Pezzoni
18	DF	GRE	Kostas Giannoulis

No.	Pos.	Nation	Player
19	MF	CRO	Mato Jajalo (on loan from AC Siena)
20	FW	MAR	Adil Chihi
21	DF	BRA	Pedro Geromel
22	MF	FRA	Fabrice Ehret
23	DF	CAN	Kevin McKenna
25	MF	POL	Adam Matuszczyk
27	FW	GER	Christian Clemens
28	DF	GER	Carsten Cullmann
29	MF	GER	Christopher Buchtmann
30	FW	GER	Simon Terodde
32	DF	GER	Stephan Salger
33	MF	GER	Michael Niedrig
34	GK	CRO	Miro Varvodić
35	DF	GER	Alexander Vaaßen
36	DF	GER	Bienvenue Basala-Mazana
37	MF	GER	Reinhold Yabo
43	DF	JPN	Tomoaki Makino

== Transfers ==
=== Summer ===
In:

No.	Pos.	Nation	Player
5	MF	GER	Martin Lanig (from VfB Stuttgart)
12	DF	BRA	Andrézinho (from Vitória S.C.)
14	FW	ROU	Alexandru Ioniţă (from Rapid Bucharest)
18	DF	GRE	Kostas Giannoulis (from Iraklis)
19	MF	CRO	Mato Jajalo (on loan from AC Siena)
29	MF	GER	Christopher Buchtmann (from Fulham F.C. Reserves)
34	GK	CRO	Miro Varvodić (from Hajduk Split, previously on loan)

Out:

No.	Pos.	Nation	Player
4	DF	GER	Marvin Matip (to FC Ingolstadt 04, previously on loan at Karlsruher SC)
6	DF	CMR	Pierre Womé (released)
9	FW	NGA	Manasseh Ishiaku (released)
12	MF	POR	Maniche (released)
14	MF	SRB	Zoran Tošić (loan return to Manchester United)
18	GK	GER	Thomas Kessler (on loan to FC St. Pauli)
26	MF	GER	Lukas Nottbeck (to TuS Koblenz, previously on loan at Borussia Dortmund II)
29	FW	GER	Sebastian Zielinsky (to FC Ingolstadt 04)
30	FW	GER	Michael Gardawski (on loan to VfB Stuttgart II, previously on loan at FC Carl Zeiss Jena)

=== Winter ===
In:

No.	Pos.	Nation	Player
1	GK	GER	Michael Rensing (free agent)
4	MF	GER	Christian Eichner (from TSG 1899 Hoffenheim)
13	FW	BFA	Wilfried Sanou (loan return from Urawa Red Diamonds)
15	MF	POL	Sławomir Peszko (from Lech Poznań)
43	DF	JPN	Tomoaki Makino (from Sanfrecce Hiroshima)

Out:

No.	Pos.	Nation	Player
1	GK	COL	Faryd Mondragón (to Philadelphia Union)
9	FW	NGA	Manasseh Ishiaku (on loan to K. Sint-Truidense V.V.)
13	MF	GER	Daniel Brosinski (to SV Wehen Wiesbaden)
49	FW	ANG	José Pierre Vunguidica (on loan to Kickers Offenbach)

== Competitions ==
=== Overview ===
Competition	First match	Last match	Starting round	Final position	Record							
Competition	First match	Last match	Starting round	Final position	Pld	W	D	L	GF	GA	GD	Win %
Bundesliga	21 August 2010	14 May 2011	Matchday 1	10th	34	13	5	16	47	62	−15	38.24
DFB-Pokal	15 August 2010	22 December 2010	First round	Round of 16	3	2	0	1	6	2	+4	66.67
Total					37	15	5	17	53	64	−11	40.54

Source: Competitions

=== Bundesliga ===
==== League table ====
Pos	Team	Pld	W	D	L	GF	GA	GD	Pts
8	Hamburger SV	34	12	9	13	46	52	−6	45
9	SC Freiburg	34	13	5	16	41	50	−9	44
10	1. FC Köln	34	13	5	16	47	62	−15	44
11	1899 Hoffenheim	34	11	10	13	50	50	0	43
12	VfB Stuttgart	34	12	6	16	60	59	+1	42

Source: kicker
Rules for classification: 1) points; 2) goal difference; 3) number of goals scored.

==== Results summary ====
Overall								Home						Away					
Pld	W	D	L	GF	GA	GD	Pts	W	D	L	GF	GA	GD	W	D	L	GF	GA	GD
34	13	5	16	47	62	−15	44	11	2	4	30	21	+9	2	3	12	17	41	−24

Source: Soccerway

==== Results by round ====
Round	1	2	3	4	5	6	7	8	9	10	11	12	13	14	15	16	17	18	19	20	21	22	23	24	25	26	27	28	29	30	31	32	33	34
Ground	H	A	H	A	A	H	A	H	A	H	A	H	A	H	A	H	A	A	H	A	H	H	A	H	A	H	A	H	A	H	A	H	A	H
Result	L	L	W	D	L	D	L	L	L	W	L	L	W	D	L	W	L	D	W	L	W	W	D	W	L	W	L	W	L	L	L	W	W	W
Position	14	17	14	12	13	15	16	17	18	15	17	18	17	16	17	16	16	16	15	16	16	13	13	11	11	11	11	11	11	12	14	14	13	10
Points	0	0	3	4	4	5	5	5	5	8	8	8	11	12	12	15	15	16	19	19	22	25	26	29	29	32	32	35	35	35	35	38	41	44

Source: Worldfootball
A = Away; H = Home; W = Win; D = Draw; L = Loss

==== Matches ====
21 August 2010 1	1. FC Köln	1–3	1. FC Kaiserslautern	Cologne
15:30 CEST (UTC+2)	Mohamad (red card) 2'; Novaković 8'; Podolski (yellow card) 78'	Report	Dick (yellow card) 37'; Jessen (yellow card) 56'; Lakić 70', 84'; Iličević 88'	Stadium: RheinEnergieStadion; Attendance: 49,200; Referee: F. Brych

28 August 2010 2	Werder Bremen	4–2	1. FC Köln	Bremen
15:30 CEST (UTC+2)	Frings 33' (pen.), (yellow card) 72'; Arnautović 36', 90+1'; Almeida 74'	Report	Lanig (yellow card) 17'; Podolski 37'; Jajalo (yellow card) 83'; McKenna 90+3'	Stadium: Weserstadion; Attendance: 35,500; Referee: M. Fritz

12 September 2010 3	1. FC Köln	1–0	FC St. Pauli	Cologne
17:30 CEST (UTC+2)	Yalçın 17'; Ehret (yellow card) 84'; Ioniță (yellow card) 89'; Mondragón (yellow card) 90'	Report	Takyi (yellow card) 26'; Thorandt (yellow card) 68'; Zambrano (yellow card) 90'	Stadium: RheinEnergieStadion; Attendance: 50,000; Referee: C. Dingert

18 September 2010 4	Bayern Munich	0–0	1. FC Köln	Munich
15:30 CEST (UTC+2)		Report	Brečko (yellow card) 63'	Stadium: Allianz Arena; Attendance: 69,000; Referee: F. Zwayer

21 September 2010 5	FSV Mainz 05	2–0	1. FC Köln	Mainz
20:00 CEST (UTC+2)	Noveski (yellow card) 25'; Svensson (yellow card) 60'; Holtby 72', 90+1'; Heller (yellow card) 76'	Report	Mondragón (yellow card) 27'; Clemens (yellow card) 40'; Pezzoni (yellow card) 67'	Stadium: Stadion am Bruchweg; Attendance: 20,300; Referee: G. Winkmann

24 September 2010 6	1. FC Köln	1–1	1899 Hoffenheim	Cologne
20:30 CEST (UTC+2)	Podolski 17'; Lanig (yellow card) 37'; Clemens (yellow card) 65'; Freis (yellow card) 85'	Report	Šimunić (yellow card) 33'; Ba 54'	Stadium: RheinEnergieStadion; Attendance: 45,000; Referee: K. Kircher

2 October 2010 7	SC Freiburg	3–2	1. FC Köln	Freiburg
15:30 CEST (UTC+2)	Rosenthal 4', 11'; Pouplin (yellow card) 31'; Cissé 70'	Report	Lanig (yellow card) 19'; Mohamad 22', (yellow card) 31'; Matuszczyk 50', (yellow card) 56'; Brečko (yellow card) 75'	Stadium: Badenova-Stadion; Attendance: 22,100; Referee: J. Drees

15 October 2010 8	1. FC Köln	1–2	Borussia Dortmund	Cologne
20:30 CEST (UTC+2)	Petit (yellow card) 69'; Podolski 82', (yellow card) 90'	Report	Hummels (yellow card) 5'; Błaszczykowski 20'; Lewandowski (yellow card) 79'; Şahin (yellow card) 90', (goal) 90+1'; Weidenfeller (yellow card) 90'	Stadium: RheinEnergieStadion; Attendance: 50,000; Referee: G. Perl

23 October 2010 9	Hannover 96	2–1	1. FC Köln	Hanover
15:30 CEST (UTC+2)	Ya Konan 4', 15'; Pinto (yellow card) 10'	Report	Brečko (yellow card) 53'; Lanig 85'	Stadium: AWD-Arena; Attendance: 44,214; Referee: P. Sippel

30 October 2010 10	1. FC Köln	3–2	Hamburger SV	Cologne
15:30 CEST (UTC+2)	Novaković 11', 29', 84'; Geromel (yellow card) 63'; Jajalo (yellow card) 90'	Report	Petrić 15'; Son 24'; Mathijsen (yellow card) 40'	Stadium: RheinEnergieStadion; Attendance: 50,000; Referee: B. Rafati

6 November 2010 11	1. FC Nürnberg	3–1	1. FC Köln	Nuremberg
15:30 CET (UTC+1)	Hegeler 11'; Gündoğan 43'; Judt (yellow card) 62'; Schieber 90'	Report	Geromel 16'; Lanig (yellow card) 55'	Stadium: EasyCredit-Stadion; Attendance: 41,789; Referee: M. Schmidt

13 November 2010 12	1. FC Köln	0–4	Borussia Mönchengladbach	Cologne
15:30 CET (UTC+1)		Report	Bobadilla 51', 90', (yellow card) 61'; Reus (yellow card) 52'; Bradley 70'; De Camargo 82'	Stadium: RheinEnergieStadion; Attendance: 50,000; Referee: P. Gagelmann

21 November 2010 13	VfB Stuttgart	0–1	1. FC Köln	Stuttgart
15:30 CET (UTC+1)	Träsch (yellow card) 26'; Gebhart (yellow card) 45'; Niedermeier (yellow card) 81'; Delpierre (yellow card) 83'	Report	Lanig (yellow card) 30': Petit (yellow card) 72'; Clemens (yellow card) 77'; Podolski 82' (pen.)	Stadium: Mercedes-Benz Arena; Attendance: 39,500; Referee: C. Dingert

28 November 2010 14	1. FC Köln	1–1	VfL Wolfsburg	Cologne
17:30 CET (UTC+1)	Geromel (yellow card) 19'; Podolski (yellow card) 22'; Novaković 51'	Report	Barzagli (yellow card) 63'; Cícero 81'; Kjær (yellow card) 87'	Stadium: RheinEnergieStadion; Attendance: 36,400; Referee: G. Winkmann

5 December 2010 15	Bayer Leverkusen	3–2	1. FC Köln	Leverkusen
15:30 CET (UTC+1)	Helmes 21'; Barnetta 55'; Reinartz 61'; Renato (yellow card) 75'	Report	Geromel 27'; Lanig 65'; Petit (yellow card) 90+2'	Stadium: BayArena; Attendance: 30,210; Referee: F. Brych

11 December 2010 16	1. FC Köln	1–0	Eintracht Frankfurt	Cologne
15:30 CET (UTC+1)	Brečko (yellow card) 15'; Ehret (yellow card) 25'; Clemens 56', (yellow card) 89'; Geromel (yellow card) 66'; Jajalo (yellow card) 84'	Report	Tzavellas (yellow card) 59'; Gekas (yellow card) 66'; Russ (yellow card) 77'	Stadium: RheinEnergieStadion; Attendance: 45,000; Referee: M. Schmidt

18 December 2010 17	Schalke 04	3–0	1. FC Köln	Gelsenkirchen
15:30 CET (UTC+1)	Raúl 30', 50', 87'	Report	Petit (yellow card) 90'	Stadium: Veltins-Arena; Attendance: 61,673; Referee: W. Stark

16 January 2011 18	1. FC Kaiserslautern	1–1	1. FC Köln	Kaiserslautern
17:30 CET (UTC+1)	Jessen (yellow card) 35'; Lakić (red card) 39'; Morávek 51'	Report	Podolski 29'; Peszko (yellow card) 32'; Eichner (yellow card) 39'; Andrezinho (yellow card) 56'; Geromel (yellow card) 77'; Yabo (yellow card) 86'; Lanig (yellow card) 89'	Stadium: Fritz-Walter-Stadion; Attendance: 42,295; Referee: G. Winkmann

22 January 2011 19	1. FC Köln	3–0	Werder Bremen	Cologne
18:30 CET (UTC+1)	Podolski 7', 84'; Geromel (yellow card) 16'; Matuszczyk 33', (yellow card) 71'; Lanig] (yellow card) 59'	Report	Arnautović (yellow card) 37'; Wiese (yellow card) 84'	Stadium: RheinEnergieStadion; Attendance: 45,100; Referee: P. Sippel

29 January 2011 20	FC St. Pauli	3–0	1. FC Köln	Hamburg
15:30 CET (UTC+1)	Takyi 30', 36'; Bruns 76' (pen.)	Report	Peszko (yellow card) 24'; Jajalo (yellow card) 61'; Lanig (yellow card) 64'; Matuszczyk (yellow card) 70'	Stadium: Millerntor-Stadion; Attendance: 24,355; Referee: F. Brych

5 February 2011 21	1. FC Köln	3–2	Bayern Munich	Cologne
15:30 CET (UTC+1)	Clemens 55'; Novaković 62', 73'	Report	Badstuber (yellow card) 19'; Gómez 22'; Altıntop 43'; Lahm (yellow card) 48'	Stadium: RheinEnergieStadion; Attendance: 50,000; Referee: F. Zwayer

13 February 2011 22	1. FC Köln	4–2	FSV Mainz 05	Cologne
15:30 CET (UTC+1)	Podolski 3', 55'; Matuszczyk (yellow card) 26'; Novaković 43', 60'; Peszko (yellow card) 72'	Report	Allagui 31'; Holtby (yellow card) 32'; Slišković 89'	Stadium: RheinEnergieStadion; Attendance: 44,000; Referee: D. Aytekin

19 February 2011 23	1899 Hoffenheim	1–1	1. FC Köln	Sinsheim
15:30 CET (UTC+1)	Alaba (yellow card) 44'; Novaković 48' (o.g.); Beck (yellow card) 68'	Report	Podolski (yellow card) 38'; Brečko (yellow card) 38'; Petit (yellow card) 67'; Mohamad 69'; Geromel (yellow card) 89'; Rensing (yellow card) 90'	Stadium: Rhein-Neckar-Arena; Attendance: 30,000; Referee: M. Schmidt

26 February 2011 24	1. FC Köln	1–0	SC Freiburg	Cologne
15:30 CET (UTC+1)	Lanig (yellow card) 29'; Podolski 89'; Novaković (yellow card) 90'	Report	Cissé (yellow card) 40'; Abdessadki (yellow card) 61'; Mujdža (yellow card) 66'	Stadium: RheinEnergieStadion; Referee: C. Dingert

4 March 2011 25	Borussia Dortmund	1–0	1. FC Köln	Dortmund
20:30 CET (UTC+1)	Lewandowski 44'	Report	Petit (yellow card) 62'; Ehret (yellow card) 64'; Lanig (yellow card) 80'	Stadium: Signal Iduna Park; Attendance: 80,720; Referee: G. Perl

11 March 2011 26	1. FC Köln	4–0	Hannover 96	Cologne
20:30 CET (UTC+1)	Petit 36'; Podolski 60'; Novaković 79', 89'	Report	Haggui (yellow card) 34'; Schulz (yellow card) 51'; Cherundolo (yellow card) 78'	Stadium: RheinEnergieStadion; Attendance: 46,500; Referee: W. Stark

19 March 2011 27	Hamburger SV	6–2	1. FC Köln	Hamburg
15:30 CET (UTC+1)	Petrić 11', 38', 43'; Ben-Hatira 31'; Kačar 51'; Zé Roberto 57' (pen.); Van Nistelrooy (yellow card) 65'	Report	Jajalo 50'; Lanig (yellow card) 52'; Novaković (yellow card) 56'; Podolski 62'	Stadium: Imtech Arena; Referee: R. Hartmann

3 April 2011 28	1. FC Köln	1–0	1. FC Nürnberg	Cologne
15:30 CEST (UTC+2)	Mohamad (yellow card) 42'; Brečko (yellow card) 56'; Novaković 90+2'	Report	Cohen (yellow card) 41'; Wolf (yellow card) 42'	Stadium: RheinEnergieStadion; Attendance: 49,000; Referee: F. Meyer

10 April 2011 29	Borussia Mönchengladbach	5–1	1. FC Köln	Mönchengladbach
15:30 CEST (UTC+2)	Arango (yellow card) 11', (goal) 29'; Reus 34', 39'; Daems 65' (pen.); Nordtveit 67'	Report	Jajalo (yellow card) 6'; Novaković 50'; Matuszczyk (yellow card) 88'	Stadium: Borussia-Park; Attendance: 53,104; Referee: M. Weiner

16 April 2011 30	1. FC Köln	1–3	VfB Stuttgart	Cologne
15:30 CEST (UTC+2)	Novaković (yellow card) 62', (goal) 68'; Petit (yellow card) 62'; Rensing (yellow card) 65'; Lanig (yellow card) 67'; Yalçın (yellow card) 79'; Podolski (yellow card) 80'	Report	Boulahrouz (yellow card) 18'; Träsch 51'; Harnik 53'; Kuzmanović 63' (pen.); Molinaro (yellow card) 70'	Stadium: RheinEnergieStadion; Attendance: 50,000; Referee: P. Sippel

24 April 2011 31	VfL Wolfsburg	4–1	1. FC Köln	Wolfsburg
15:30 CEST (UTC+2)	Mandžukić 14', 39'; Dejagah 58', 88'	Report	Freis 40'	Stadium: Volkswagen Arena; Attendance: 30,000; Referee: G. Perl

30 April 2011 32	1. FC Köln	2–0	Bayer Leverkusen	Cologne
15:30 CEST (UTC+2)	Geromel (yellow card) 43'; Novaković 67', 82'; Eichner (yellow card) 72'	Report	Kießling (yellow card) 43'; Bender (yellow card) 64'	Stadium: RheinEnergieStadion; Attendance: 50,000; Referee: D. Aytekin

7 May 2011 33	Eintracht Frankfurt	0–2	1. FC Köln	Frankfurt
15:30 CEST (UTC+2)	Ochs (yellow card) 8'; Fenin (yellow card) 27'; Caio (yellow card) 90'	Report	Chihi 24', (yellow card) 38'; Novaković (yellow card) 62'; Petit (yellow card) 64'; Podolski 90+3' (pen.)	Stadium: Commerzbank-Arena; Attendance: 51,500; Referee: F. Brych

14 May 2011 34	1. FC Köln	2–1	Schalke 04	Cologne
15:30 CEST (UTC+2)	Novaković 25'; Geromel (yellow card) 53'; Jajalo 60'; McKenna (yellow card) 88'	Report	Papadopoulos (yellow card) 41'; Raúl 87'	Stadium: RheinEnergieStadion; Attendance: 50,000; Referee: M. Schmidt

=== DFB-Pokal ===
15 August 2010 First round	ZFC Meuselwitz	0–2	1. FC Köln	Meuselwitz
14:30 CEST (UTC+2)	Oswald (yellow card) 34'; Riese (yellow card) 47'; Baum (yellow card) 57'	Report	Yalçın 6'; Jajalo (yellow card) 45'; Novaković 45'	Stadium: bluechip-Arena; Attendance: 9,018; Referee: Georg Schalk; Assistant referees: Walter Hofmann, Thomas Färber

26 October 2010 Second round	1. FC Köln	3–0	1860 Munich	Cologne
19:00 CEST (UTC+2)	Lanig 58'; Matuszczyk (yellow card) 63'; Novaković 79', (yellow card) 81'; Podolski 83', (yellow card) 86'; Yalçın (yellow card) 90'	Report	Lovin (yellow card) 62'	Stadium: RheinEnergieStadion; Attendance: 24,500; Referee: Markus Wingenbach; Assistant referees: Markus Sinn, Florian Steuer

22 December 2010 Round of 16	1. FC Köln	1–2	MSV Duisburg	Cologne
19:10 CET (UTC+1)	Podolski (yellow card) 13'; Yalçın (yellow card) 30'; Ehret (yellow card) 34'; Matuszczyk (yellow card) 65'; Terodde 84'	Report	Maierhofer 3', (yellow card) 21'; Koch 76'	Stadium: RheinEnergieStadion; Attendance: 44,500; Referee: Knut Kircher; Assistant referees: Robert Kempter, Martin Petersen
