= 2012–13 1. FC Köln season =

1. FC Köln
2012–13 season
- Chairman: Werner Spinner
- Manager: Holger Stanislawski
- Stadium: RheinEnergieStadion, Cologne, NRW
- 2. Bundesliga: 5th
- DFB-Pokal: Round of 16
- Highest home attendance: 46,000 (vs. 1. FC Kaiserslautern)
- Lowest home attendance: 22,900 (vs. SV Sandhausen)
- Average home league attendance: 37,811
Home colours	Away colours	Third colours

The 2012–13 1. FC Köln season was the 64th season in club history. In the 2012–13 season, the club played in the 2. Bundesliga; the second tier of German football. It was the club's first season back in this league, after being relegated from the Bundesliga in 2012. The season started on 5 August 2012 and ended on 19 May 2013.

== Review and events ==
=== Season ===
The club is taking part of the 2012–13 edition of the 2. Bundesliga and the 2012–13 edition of the DFB-Pokal. The season started on 5 August 2012 with a loss against Eintracht Braunschweig and ended on 19 May 2013 against Ingolstadt 04.

The club started their league season with a six-match winless streak. Their first league win came against FSV Frankfurt on matchday seven. Overall, The first victory came against SpVgg Unterhaching in the opening round of the cup.

Holger Stanislawski was hired as the new head coach on 14 May 2012.

=== Discipline ===
1. FC Köln was hit with a €50,000 fine. The club was only allowed to sell 15.000 tickets to its own supporters and a maximum of 5.000 tickets to supporters of SV Sandhausen. The club stated that this is an economic loss of approximately €500,000. The club appealed the decision and will only pay €40,000 fine and the maximum number of tickets that can be sold to its own supporters was increased to 22.500.

=== Financial problems ===
There have been repeated rumours about the club being in a grave financial situation. In a letter to club supporters, the club stated "The current financial position of the 1st FC Köln is serious. However, we also want to use this letter to continually eliminate repeated rumors that are without substance. An over-dramatizing the situation is just as damaging as to trivialize it." The club stated that they'll be using revenue bonds for debt restructuring.

=== Problem supporters ===
Supporters of the club went to the home of Kevin Pezzoni and harassed and threatened him. Pezzoni's car was "smeared." There was an anti-Pezzoni Group on Facebook where more than 400 people joined. This isn't the first case where club supporters went to the home of a 1. FC Köln footballer. Club supporters went to Pedro Geromel's home during the night. Pezzoni had his contract dissolved because of the incident. Pezzoni stated that he didn't want to terminate his contract and had hoped that the club would stand behind him against the problem supporters.

==== Chronology of events ====
Date	Event	Source
19 February 2012	In a carnival party, Kevin Pezzoni has to have surgery because of a broken nose after an incident. Pezzoni was "portrayed as one of the biggest scapegoats" during the 2011–12 season	
27 August 2012	1. FC Köln starts the season without any victory. Erzgebirge Aue defeats 1. FC Köln in the 4th match of the season. The defence was blamed and Pezzoni is the specific player blamed for the loss.	
28 August 2012	An angry club supporter starts a Facebook page against Pezzoni. That night, five "extreme" supporters go outside Pezzoni's flat and made threats. His car is defaced.	
31 August 2012	Pezzoni is transfer listed.	
1 September 2012	Pezzoni is released from his contract.	
2 September 2012	Pezzoni leaves Cologne and moves in with his parents in Frankfurt.	
6 September 2012	Jürgen Domian, who called himself Benny, is named as the initiator of the incident at Pezzoni's flat. He is a 21 years old with a criminal record.	

== Match results and fixtures ==
=== Legend ===
Win Draw Loss Postponed

=== 2. Bundesliga ===
==== League results and fixtures ====
Match	Date	Time^{1}	Venue	City	Opponent	Result^{2}	Attendance	Goalscorers		Table		Source
Match	Date	Time^{1}	Venue	City	Opponent	Result^{2}	Attendance	1. FC Köln	Opponent	Pos.	Pts.	Source
1	5 August 2012	15:30	Eintracht-Stadion	Braunschweig	Eintracht Braunschweig	0–1	21,820	—	Ademi 68'	16	0	
2	10 August 2012	18:00	RheinEnergieStadion	Cologne	SV Sandhausen	1–1	22,900	Bröker 63' (pen.)	Dorn 89'	15	1	
3	27 August 2012	20:15	Sparkassen-Erzgebirgsstadion	Aue	Erzgebirge Aue	0–2	9,000	—	Müller 8'; Savran 55'	17	1	
4	31 August 2012	18:15	RheinEnergieStadion	Cologne	Energie Cottbus	0–1	34,000	—	Sanogo 30'	17	1	
5	17 September 2012	20:45	RheinEnergieStadion	Cologne	FC St. Pauli	0–0	45,200	—	—	16	2	
6	21 September 2012	18:00	Stadion An der Alten Försterei	Berlin	Union Berlin	1–2	16,750	Bröker 3' (pen.)	Silvio 27'; Mattuschka 56'	17	2	
7	25 September 2012	17:30	RheinEnergieStadion	Cologne	FSV Frankfurt	2–1	32,000	Strobl 46'; Chihi 82'	Verboek 90'	16	5	
8	28 September 2012	18:00	Benteler Arena	Paderborn	Paderborn 07	2–1	15,000	Ujah 18'; Chihi 69'	Zeitz 53'	14	8	
9	8 October 2012	20:15	RheinEnergieStadion	Cologne	Dynamo Dresden	1–1	41,800	Ujah 77'	Poté 31'	13	9	
10	20 October 2012	13:00	Jahnstadion	Regensburg	Jahn Regensburg	3–2	11,465	Ujah 87'; Maroh 90'; Bigalke 90+3'	Müller 5'; Rahn 67' (pen.)	11	12	
11	26 October 2012	18:00	RheinEnergieStadion	Cologne	1. FC Kaiserslautern	3–3	46,000	Chihi 23'; Clemens 43'; Royer 75'	Baumjohann 9'; Idrissou 60', 88'	10	13	
12	4 November 2012	13:30	Scholz-Arena	Aalen	VfR Aalen	0–2	10,091	—	Dausch 31'; Cidimar 77'	12	13	
13	9 November 2012	18:00	RheinEnergieStadion	Cologne	MSV Duisburg	0–0	39,900	—	—	12	14	
14	16 November 2012	20:30	Allianz Arena	Munich	1860 München	2–0	25,800	McKenna 3'; Chihi 75'	—	11	17	
15	23 November 2012	18:00	RheinEnergieStadion	Cologne	VfL Bochum	3–1	40,000	Ujah 11', 84'; McKenna 35'	Gelashvili 90'	10	20	
16	29 November 2012	20:15	Olympic Stadium	Berlin	Hertha BSC	1–1	36,000	McKenna 34'	Ronny 44'	11	21	
17	2 December 2012	13:30	RheinEnergieStadion	Cologne	Ingolstadt 04	1–0	38,500	Ujah 45'	—	10	24	
18	10 December 2012	20:15	RheinEnergieStadion	Cologne	Eintracht Braunschweig	2–2	38,000	Clemens 47'; Ujah 88'	Kumbela 23'; Bičakčić 90+1'	T9	25	
19	14 December 2012	18:00	Hardtwaldstadion	Sandhausen	SV Sandhausen	0–0	6,200	—	—	T9	26	
20	2 February 2013	13:00	RheinEnergieStadion	Cologne	Erzgebirge Aue	2–1	41,800	Maroh 4'; Clemens 90+2'	Pezzoni 79'	8	29	
21	9 February 2013	13:00	Stadion der Freundschaft	Cottbus	Energie Cottbus	0–0	10,201	—	—	9	30	
22	18 February 2013	20:15	Millerntor-Stadion	Hamburg	FC St. Pauli	1–0	29,063	Clemens 3'	—	5	33	
23	23 February 2013	13:00	RheinEnergieStadion	Cologne	Union Berlin	2–0	42,000	McKenna 18'; Maierhofer 52'	—	4	36	
24	3 March 2013	13:30	Frankfurter Volksbank Stadion	Frankfurt	FSV Frankfurt	1–1	10,740	Clemens 83'	Yelen 76' (pen.)	4	37	
25	9 March 2013	13:00	RheinEnergieStadion	Cologne	Paderborn 07	3–0	42,700	Matuschyk 29'; Ujah 64', 83'	—	4	40	
26	18 March 2013	20:15	Glücksgas Stadium	Dresden	Dynamo Dresden	2–0	27,284	Ujah 73', 81'	—	4	43	
27	31 March 2013	13:30	RheinEnergieStadion	Cologne	Jahn Regensburg	2–1	45,600	McKenna 28'; Royer 87'	Djuricin 73'	3	46	
28	5 April 2013	18:00	Fritz-Walter-Stadion	Kaiserslautern	1. FC Kaiserslautern	0–3	49,780	—	Idrissou 41', 79'; Šimůnek 50'	4	46	
29	14 April 2013	13:30	RheinEnergieStadion	Cologne	VfR Aalen	1–0	44,100	Przybyłko 90+3'	—	4	49	
30	22 April 2013	20:15	Schauinsland-Reisen-Arena	Duisburg	MSV Duisburg	1–1	27,029	Bröker 23'	Bomheuer 90+2'	4	50	
31	28 April 2013	13:30	RheinEnergieStadion	Cologne	1860 München	1–1	49,100	Ujah 7'	Halfar 78'	4	51	
32	4 May 2013	13:00	rewirpowerSTADION	Bochum	VfL Bochum	1–2	28,400	Chihi 30'	Dedić 65'; Maltritz 79'	4	51	
33	12 May 2013	13:30	RheinEnergieStadion	Cologne	Hertha BSC	1–2	49,500	Clemens 68'	Kobiashvili 36' (pen.); Morales 55'	5	51	
34	19 May 2013	13:30	Audi Sportpark	Ingolstadt	Ingolstadt 04	3–0	12,520	Royer 48'; Nascimento 76'; Ujah 77' (pen.)	—	5	54	

==== Table ====
===== Overall league table =====
Pos	Team	Pld	W	D	L	GF	GA	GD	Pts	Promotion, qualification or relegation
2	Eintracht Braunschweig (P)	34	19	10	5	52	34	+18	67	Promotion to Bundesliga
3	1. FC Kaiserslautern	34	15	13	6	55	33	+22	58	Qualification for promotion play-offs
4	FSV Frankfurt	34	16	6	12	55	45	+10	54	
5	1. FC Köln	34	14	12	8	43	33	+10	54	
6	1860 Munich	34	12	13	9	39	31	+8	49	
7	Union Berlin	34	13	10	11	50	49	+1	49	
8	Energie Cottbus	34	12	12	10	41	36	+5	48	

Source: kicker.de
Rules for classification: 1) points; 2) goal difference; 3) number of goals scored.
(P) Promoted

===== Results summary =====
Overall								Home						Away					
Pld	W	D	L	GF	GA	GD	Pts	W	D	L	GF	GA	GD	W	D	L	GF	GA	GD
31	13	12	6	38	29	+9	51	8	7	1	24	13	+11	5	5	5	14	16	−2

Last updated: 2 May 2013.
Source: kicker

=== DFB-Pokal ===
Round	Date	Time^{1}	Venue	City	Opponent	Result^{2}	Attendance	1. FC Köln; goalscorers	Source
1	18 August 2012	15:30	Generali Sportpark	Unterhaching	SpVgg Unterhaching	2–1	7,500	Bröker 28', 40'	
2	30 October 2012	19:00	EWR-Arena	Worms	Wormatia Worms	0–0	7,203	—	
3	19 December 2012	20:30	Mercedes-Benz Arena	Stuttgart	VfB Stuttgart	1–2	27,500	Clemens 80'	

== Squad information ==
=== Squad and statistics ===
==== Squad, appearances and goals ====
As of 19 March 2013

No.	Pos	Nat	Player	Total		2. Bundesliga		DFB-Pokal	
No.	Pos	Nat	Player	Apps	Goals	Apps	Goals	Apps	Goals
Goalkeepers
1	GK	(Germany) GER	Timo Horn	28	0	26	0	2	0
18	GK	(Germany) GER	Thomas Kessler	1	0	0	0	1	0
28	GK	(Germany) GER	Marcel Schuhen	0	0	0	0	0	0
Defenders
2	DF	(Slovenia) SLO	Mišo Brečko	29	0	26	0	3	0
3	DF	(Germany) GER	Lukas Kübler	1	0	1	0	0	0
4	DF	(Germany) GER	Christian Eichner	16	0	15	0	1	0
5	DF	(Germany) GER	Dominic Maroh	28	2	25	2	3	0
17	DF	(Germany) GER	Bienvenue Basala-Mazana	0	0	0	0	0	0
21	DF	(Greece) GRE	Konstantinos Giannoulis	0	0	0	0	0	0
23	DF	(Canada) CAN	Kevin McKenna	22	4	20	4	2	0
28	DF	(Austria) AUT	Kevin Wimmer	11	0	9	0	2	0
	DF	(Brazil) BRA	Bruno Nascimento	3	0	3	0	0	0
Midfielders
7	MF	(Morocco) MAR	Adil Chihi	17	4	16	4	1	0
8	MF	(Poland) POL	Adam Matuszczyk	23	1	21	1	2	0
13	MF	(Bosnia and Herzegovina) BIH	Dino Bisanovic	0	0	0	0	0	0
14	MF	(Germany) GER	Jonas Hector	20	0	18	0	2	0
15	MF	(Germany) GER	Tobias Strobl	19	1	16	1	3	0
19	MF	(Croatia) CRO	Mato Jajalo	21	0	19	0	2	0
20	MF	(Tunisia) TUN	Reinhold Yabo	0	0	0	0	0	0
21	MF	(Germany) GER	Sascha Bigalke	16	1	14	1	2	0
25	MF	(Austria) AUT	Daniel Royer	24	1	21	1	3	0
27	MF	(Germany) GER	Christian Clemens	25	6	23	5	2	1
33	MF	(Germany) GER	Matthias Lehmann	22	0	20	0	2	0
Strikers
9	FW	(Austria) AUT	Stefan Maierhofer	7	1	7	1	0	0
11	FW	(Germany) GER	Thomas Bröker	19	4	18	2	1	2
22	MF	(Nigeria) NGR	Anthony Ujah	24	11	22	11	2	0
24	FW	(Poland) POL	Kacper Przybyłko	10	0	8	0	2	0
No longer at club^{3}
6	MF	(Germany) GER	Kevin Pezzoni	3	0	2	0	1	0
9	FW	(North Korea) PRK	Chong Tese	6	0	5	0	1	0
16	FW	(Sweden) SWE	Mikael Ishak	8	0	7	0	1	0
22	MF	(Albania) ALB	Odise Roshi	0	0	0	0	0	0
	GK	(Germany) GER	Daniel Schwabke	0	0	0	0	0	0

==== Bookings ====
As of 19 March 2013

Number	Name	2. Bundesliga			DFB-Pokal			Total		
Number	Name	Yellow card	(yellow card) (red card)	Red card	Yellow card	(yellow card) (red card)	Red card	Yellow card	(yellow card) (red card)	Red card
33	Matthias Lehmann	5	0	0	0	0	0	5	0	0
5	Dominic Maroh	5	0	0	0	0	0	5	0	0
8	Adam Matuschyk	4	0	0	0	0	0	4	0	0
21	Anthony Ujah	4	0	0	0	0	0	4	0	0
16	Mikael Ishak	3	0	0	0	0	0	3	0	0
19	Mato Jajalo	3	0	0	0	0	0	3	0	0
15	Tobias Strobl	3	0	0	0	0	0	3	0	0
2	Mišo Brečko	2	0	0	1	0	0	3	0	0
21	Sascha Bigalke	2	0	0	0	0	0	2	0	0
11	Thomas Bröker	2	0	0	0	0	0	2	0	0
7	Adil Chihi	2	0	0	0	0	0	2	0	0
27	Christian Clemens	2	0	0	0	0	0	2	0	0
23	Kevin McKenna	2	0	0	0	0	0	2	0	0
4	Christian Eichner	1	0	0	0	0	0	1	0	0
14	Jonas Hector	1	0	0	0	0	0	1	0	0
9	Stefan Maierhofer	1	0	0	0	0	0	1	0	0
25	Daniel Royer	1	0	0	0	0	0	1	0	0
28	Kevin Wimmer	1	0	0	0	0	0	1	0	0
6	Kevin Pezzoni	1	0	0	0	0	0	1	0	0
TOTALS		45	0	0	1	0	0	46	0	0

=== Transfers ===
==== In ====
No.	Pos.	Name	Age	EU	Moving from	Type	Transfer Window	Contract ends	Transfer fee	Sources
	Midfield	Matthias Lehmann	29	Yes	Eintracht Frankfurt	Transfer	Summer		Martin Lanig	
	Midfield	Daniel Royer	22	Yes	Hannover 96	Loan	Summer			
	Defence	Kevin Wimmer	19	Yes	LASK Linz	Transfer	Summer			
	Midfield	Sascha Bigalke	22	Yes	SpVgg Unterhaching	Transfer	Summer	30 June 2015		
	Midfield	Anthony Ujah	21	No	Mainz 05	Loan	Summer	30 June 2013		
	Forward	Stefan Maierhofer	30	Yes	Red Bull Salzburg		Winter	30 June 2013		

==== Out ====
No.	Pos.	Name	Age	EU	Moving to	Type	Transfer Window	Transfer fee	Sources
9	Forward	Lukas Podolski	27	Yes	Arsenal F.C.	Transfer	Summer	€13 Million	
	Midfielder	Armando Petit	35	Yes	Boavista F.C.	End of contract	Summer	Free	
	Defender	Andrezinho	30	No			Summer	Free	
	Forward	Mark Uth	20	Yes	SC Heerenveen	Transfer	Summer	Undisclosed	
	Midfielder	Mitchell Weiser	18	Yes	Bayern Munich	Transfer	Summer		
	Defender	Pedro Geromel	31	Yes	RCD Mallorca	Loan	Summer	Undisclosed	
	Goalkeeper	Michael Rensing	28	Yes	Bayer Leverkusen		Summer	Free	
	Midfielder	Christopher Buchtmann	20	Yes	FC St. Pauli	Transfer	Summer	Free	
6	Midfielder	Kevin Pezzoni	23	Yes	Erzgebirge Aue	Released	Winter	Free	
	Forward	Chong Tese	29	No	Suwon Samsung Bluewings		Winter		

== Notes ==
- 1.Times are in the CET/CEST.
- 2.1. FC Köln goals listed first.
- 3.Players who were in the squad at the time of the first competitive fixture; but have left the club or loan out since.
