= Alexandru Ioniță =

Alexandru Ioniță may refer to:

- Alexandru Ioniță (footballer, born 1989), Romanian footballer
- Alexandru Ioniță (footballer, born 1994), Romanian footballer
