= 2010–11 in German football =

101st season of competitive football in Germany

Football in Germany
- Season: 2010–11

Men's football
- Bundesliga: Borussia Dortmund
- 2. Bundesliga: Hertha BSC
- 3. Liga: Eintracht Braunschweig
- DFB-Pokal: Schalke 04
- DFL-Supercup: Bayern Munich

Women's football
- Frauen-Bundesliga: Turbine Potsdam
- DFB-Pokal: 1. FFC Frankfurt

The 2010–11 season is the 101st season of competitive football in Germany.

== Diary of the season ==
7 August 2010 – Defending Bundesliga champions Bayern Munich defeat Schalke 04 2–0 to win the DFL Supercup. The first games in the women's DFB-Pokal are played.

13 August 2010 – The DFB-Pokal kicks off. The tournament features the 36 teams of the 1st and 2nd Bundesliga, the top four teams from the 3rd Liga, the 19 state cup champions, and the cup runners-up from Bavaria, Lower Saxony, and Westfalia.

15 August 2010 – The women's Bundesliga and 2nd Bundesliga seasons begin.

20 August 2010 – The Bundesliga season begins with a match between Bayern Munich and VfL Wolfsburg. Bayern win the match 2–1. The first matches of the 2nd Bundesliga are also played.

18 September 2010 – After three consecutive losses, VfB Stuttgart put on a scoring gala against Borussia Mönchengladbach. The 7–0 victory is one of the biggest in Bundesliga history.

2 October 2010 – With a 4–2 victory over 1899 Hoffenheim, Mainz 05 win their seventh consecutive Bundesliga match. Only on two other occasions has a club managed to win their first seven games of the season: Bayer Munich in 1995 and 1. FC Kaiserslautern in 2001.

13 October 2010 – Last place in the Bundesliga, VfB Stuttgart sack manager Christian Gross. The Swiss coach had taken over from Markus Babbel about a year and a half earlier. Assistant manager Jens Keller takes over the managers post in the interim.

24 October 2010 – 1. FC Köln relieve Zvonimir Soldo of his duties as manager, replacing him with reserve-team-manager Frank Schaefer. Soldo had replaced Christoph Daum as manager at the beginning of the previous season.

31 October 2010 – Having lost five of their six previous matches, Karlsruher SC sack Markus Schupp. KSC II manager Markus Kauczinski is appointed caretaker.

6 November 2010 – In the last two places in the 2. Bundesliga, both FC Ingolstadt and Arminia Bielefeld sack their managers. Michael Wiesinger had been appointed manager in Ingolstadt almost exactly one year prior, and had led the team to promotion from the 3. Liga. Christian Ziege had taken the reins in Bielefeld, his first senior managerial post, at the beginning of the season.

7 November 2010 – FC Ingolstadt appoint Benno Möhlmann as their new manager. Möhlmann had lasted managed Greuther Fürth, and had also previously managed Bundesliga club Hamburger SV. Arminia Bielefeld also appoint a new manager, Ewald Lienen, to replace Christian Ziege. Lienen had previously managed several German clubs. His most recent managerial post was with Olympiacos in Greece.

22 November 2010 – Three weeks after sacking Markus Schupp, Karlsruher SC hire Uwe Rapolder to replace him as manager. Rapolder had most recently managed TuS Koblenz, and had previously been in charge of other second division teams as well.

4 December 2010 – Two matchdays before the winter break, Borussia Dortmund win the so-called fall championship. After losing 2–1 to Eintracht Frankfurt, Dortmund's closest pursuer, Mainz 05, are unable to pass them until after the break.

11 December 2010 – Not having managed to keep his team clear of the relegation zone, Jens Keller is sacked as manager of VfB Stuttgart. He had only assumed the post two months earlier.

12 December 2010 – To replace Jens Keller, VfB Stuttgart sign Bruno Labbadia as manager. Labbadia had previously managed Hamburger SV, and Bayer Leverkusen.

19 December 2010 – The last Bundesliga matches before the winter break are played.

2 January 2011 – By mutual consent, 1899 Hoffenheim and Ralf Rangnick dissolve the latter's contract as manager. Rangnick had led Hoffenheim's rise from the third division, culminating in the fall championship in 2008. Assistant manager Marco Pezzaiuoli takes over the post of manager. Prior to joining Hoffenheim, Pezziauli had managed several of Germany's youth national teams.

7 January 2011 – For a record-breaking transfer fee between €31–35 million, Bosnian striker Edin Džeko leaves VfL Wolfsburg to join Manchester City.

7 February 2011 – Having won only 1 of the previous 11 matches, VfL Wolfsburg sack Englishman Steve McClaren as manager. McClaren had taken the reins at Wolfsburg at the beginning of the season. He is replaced by his assistant, Pierre Littbarski.

13 February 2011 – In eighteenth place in the Bundesliga since late November, Borussia Mönchengladbach sack manager Michael Frontzeck. Frontzeck had managed the club for a year and a half, helping the Gladbach avoid relegation the previous season.

14 February 2011 – To replace Michael Frontzeck, Borussia Mönchengladbach sign Swiss manager Lucien Favre. From 2007 to 2009, Favre had managed then-Bundesliga club Hertha BSC, who qualified for the UEFA Europa League twice under Favre.

22 February 2011 – Having dropped into the relegation zone in the 2. Bundesliga, Rot-Weiß Oberhausen sack Hans-Günter Bruns as manager. A German international during his playing career, Bruns had held various posts in Oberhausen since 2006.

24 February 2011 – Borussia Dortmund reserve team manager Theo Schneider transfers to Rot-Weiß Oberhausen. Besides managing the youth and reserve teams in Dortmund, Schneider briefly managed Arminia Bielefeld in 1994.

12 March 2011 – Scoring from a distance of 73 m, Georgios Tzavelas breaks the Bundesliga record for a goal scored from the greatest distance, and ends Eintracht Frankfurt's eight-game goalless spell. In spite of Greek defender's record-breaking goal, Frankfurt still lose the game to Schalke 04 by a score of 2–1.

13 March 2011 – The last matches in the Women's Bundesliga are played. One point ahead of runners-up 1. FFC Frankfurt, Turbine Potsdam win the championship, with both teams qualifying for the UEFA Women's Champions League. At the other end of the table, 1. FC Saarbrücken and Herforder SV are relegated.

13 March 2011 – Following a 6–0 loss Bayern Munich, Hamburger SV sack manager Armin Veh, replacing him with his assistant Michael Oenning. Veh had taken the managerial post at the beginning of the season.

16 March 2011 – In spite of successes in the DFB-Pokal and Champions League, Felix Magath is sacked as manager of Schalke 04. Under Magath, Schalke had finished second in the Bundesliga the previous season, but struggled especially at the beginning of the 2010–11 season. Magath had also faced criticism for his transfer policies.

17 March 2011 – Former 1899 Hoffenheim manager Ralf Rangnick fills the vacant managerial post at Schalke 04. In addition to successfully bringing Hoffenheim from the third division to the Bundesliga, Rangnick previously managed VfB Stuttgart and Hannover 96. This is Rangnick's second managerial stint for Schalke.

18 March 2011 – Just two days after being sacked by Schalke, Felix Magath signs on at VfL Wolfsburg as manager, replacing Pierre Littbarski. In 2008–09, Wolfsburg won the Bundesliga under Magath.

22 March 2011 – Having won only a single game since the winter break, Eintracht Frankfurt sack manager Michael Skibbe. Skibbe had taken the post at the beginning of the previous season following the resignation of Friedhelm Funkel, and led the team to a 10th-place finish. Skibbe's replacement is Christoph Daum, who previously managed several Bundesliga clubs and won the Turkish Süper Lig three times. He was also set to manage the Germany national team, but his agreement was dropped following a cocaine-use scandal.

26 March 2011 – By a score of 2–1, 1. FFC Frankfurt defeat league champions Turbine Potsdam in the final of the Women's DFB-Pokal. This is the eight time Frankfurt have won the cup, and marks their first title of any kind in three years.

1 April 2011 – After assistant referee Thorsten Schiffner was hit in the back of the neck with a filled beer cup thrown from the stands, referee Deniz Aytekin suspends the Bundesliga match between FC St. Pauli and Schalke 04 in the 89th minute. At the time of suspension, Schalke were leading 2–0 and two St. Pauli players had previously been ejected from the match.

9 April 2011 – Having already announced that manager Louis van Gaal would be leaving the club at the end of the season, Bayern Munich sack the Dutchman. Van Gaal had taken the reins at Bayern at the beginning of the previous season, and led the club to the championship, as well as winning the DFB-Pokal and a second-place finish in the Champions League. Van Gaal's assistant, Andries Jonker, takes over as caretaker.

25 April 2011 – With three more matches to be played, Hertha BSC secure promotion to the Bundesliga following a 1–0 victory over MSV Duisburg. Relegated from the Bundesliga the previous season, Hertha had been leading the 2. Bundesliga since January.

27 April 2011 – After three consecutive losses and his club at risk of relegation, Frank Schaefer resigns his post as manager of 1. FC Köln three weeks before the end of the season. Schaefer had taken over from Zvonimir Soldo earlier in the season. Volker Finke takes over the post in the interim, even though he had stated he would become manager upon his arrival in Cologne as Director of Sport several months earlier.

30 April 2011 – Following a 2–0 victory over 1. FC Nürnberg, Borussia Dortmund secure the German Championship with two matches to be played. Dortmund had been in first place in the Bundesliga since October. The win marked Borussia's fourth Bundesliga title.

7 May 2011 – On the second-to-last match day, Bayern Munich put on a scoring gala, beating FC St. Pauli 8–1. The loss results in St. Pauli being relegated to the 2. Bundesliga, having only been promoted from the second division the previous season.

14 May 2011 – The final matches in the Bundesliga are played. Borussia Dortmund had already secured the championship. Behind them, Bayer Leverkusen and Bayern Munich also qualify for the Champions League, while Hannover 96 and Mainz 05 qualify for the Europa League. At the other end of the table, Eintracht Frankfurt and FC St. Pauli are directly relegated, while Borussia Mönchengladbach finish 16th and are forced play a relegation play-off.

15 May 2011 – The 2. Bundesliga season concludes. Hertha BSC and FC Augsburg had secured promotion prior to the final match day. VfL Bochum qualify for the play-off against Borussia Mönchengladbach. Arminia Bielefeld and Rot-Weiß Oberhausen are relegated to the 3. Liga, and VfL Osnabrück play a relegation play-off against Dynamo Dresden.

19 May 2011 – With a last minute goal by Igor de Camargo, Borussia Mönchengladbach win the first leg of the Bundesliga relegation play-off by a score of 1–0 over VfL Bochum.

20 May 2011 – Dynamo Dresden host VfL Osnabrück in the first leg of the 2. Bundesliga relegation play-off. The match ends in a 1–1 draw.

21 May 2011 – By a score of 5–0, Schalke 04 win the final of the DFB-Pokal over MSV Duisburg. It marked Schalke's fifth cup, and the club's first trophy since 2002.

24 May 2011 – In the second leg of the 2. Bundesliga relegation play-off, VfL Osnabrück and Dynamo Dresden play to another 1–1 draw over 90 minutes. Dresden score twice in extra time, winning the tie 4–2 on aggregate and earning promotion to the 2. Bundesliga.

25 May 2011 – Borussia Mönchengladbach manage a 1–1 draw against VfL Bochum in the second leg of the Bundesliga relegation play-off. Having won the first leg, Gladbach win the tie 2–1 and retain their place in the Bundesliga.

26 June 2011 – 73,680 spectator's attend the opening ceremonies of the 2011 FIFA World Cup in Berlin's Olympic Stadium, a record for women's football. Germany win the opening fixture over Canada by 2–1.

9 July 2011 – Germany's World Cup campaign ends with a quarter-final loss to Japan by a score of 1–0 in extra time.

== Men's national team ==
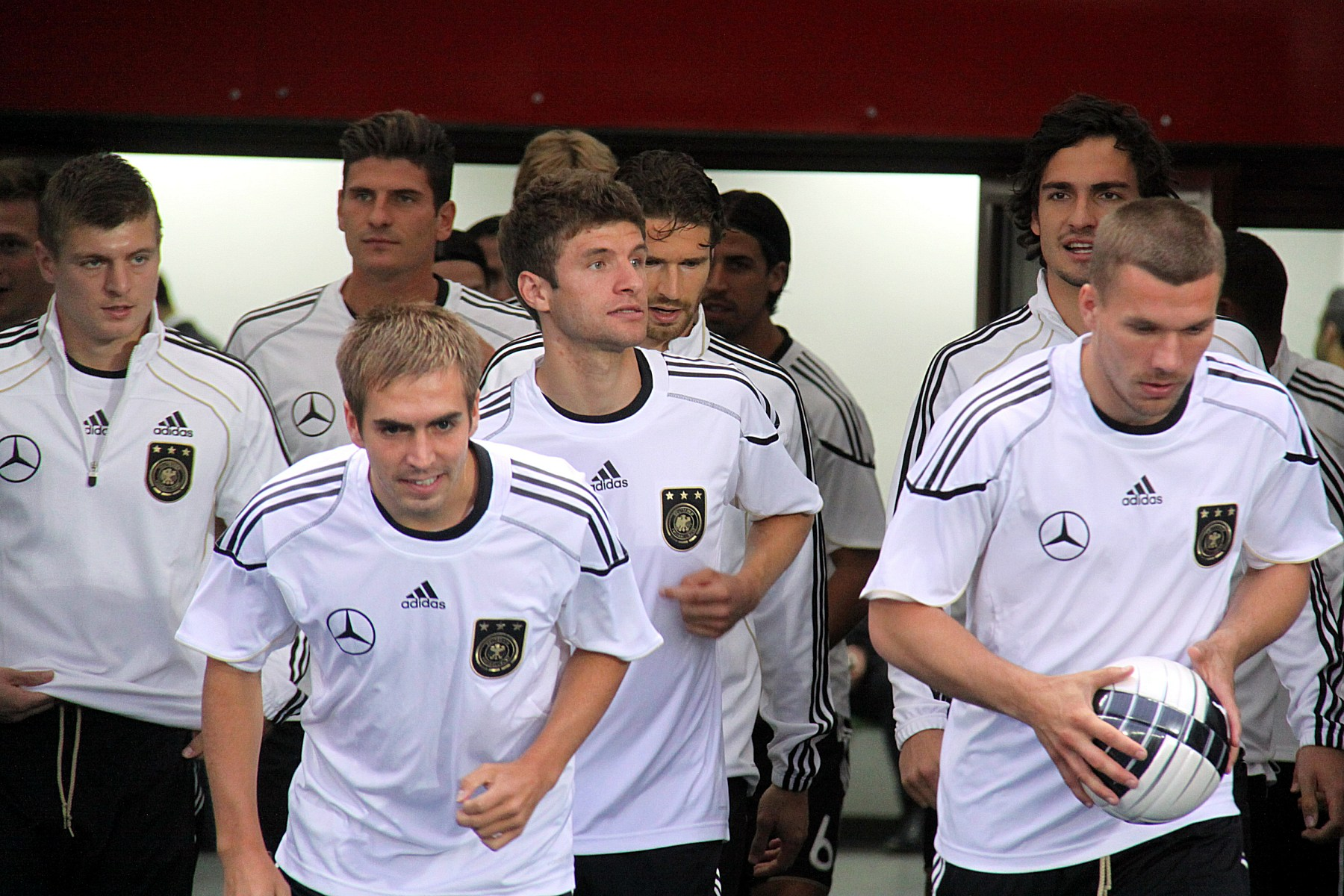
The Germany squad before a UEFA Euro 2012 qualification match in June 2011 (l-r: Toni Kroos, Mario Gómez, Philipp Lahm, Thomas Müller, Arne Friedrich, Sami Khedira, Mats Hummels and Lukas Podolski).

The home team is on the left column; the away team is on the right column.

Win Draw Loss

=== Friendly matches ===
| 11 August 2010 | Denmark | 2 – 2 | Germany | Copenhagen, Denmark |
| 18:30 UTC | Rommedahl 74'; Junker 87' | Report | Gómez 19'; Helmes 73' | Stadium: Parken Stadium; Attendance: 16,100; Referee: Alan Kelly (Ireland) |

| 17 November 2010 | Sweden | 0 – 0 | Germany | Gothenburg, Sweden |
| 20:30 UTC+2 | | Report | | Stadium: Ullevi; Attendance: 21,959; Referee: Carlos Velasco Carballo (Spain) |

| 9 February 2011 | Germany | 1 – 1 | Italy | Dortmund, Germany |
| 20:45 UTC+1 | Klose 16' | Report | Rossi 81' | Stadium: Signal Iduna Park; Attendance: 60,145; Referee: Eric Braamhaar (Netherlands) |

| 29 March 2011 | Germany | 1 – 2 | Australia | Mönchengladbach, Germany |
| 20:45 UTC+2 | Gómez 26' | Report | Carney 61'; Wilkshire 63' (pen.) | Stadium: Borussia Park; Attendance: 30,152; Referee: Stéphane Lannoy (France) |

| 29 May 2011 | Germany | 2 – 1 | Uruguay | Sinsheim, Germany |
| 20:00 UTC+2 | Gómez 20'; Schürrle 35' | Report | Gargano 48' | Stadium: Rhein-Neckar-Arena; Attendance: 22,655; Referee: Olegário Benquerença (Portugal) |

=== Euro 2012 Qualifying ===
The German men's national team were drawn into UEFA Euro 2012 qualifying Group A.

All fixtures for this group were negotiated between the participants at a meeting in Frankfurt, Germany on 21 and 22 February 2010.

| 3 September 2010 | Belgium | 0 – 1 | Germany | Brussels, Belgium |
| 20:45 UTC+2 | | Report | Klose 51' | Stadium: King Baudouin Stadium; Attendance: 42,000; Referee: Terje Hauge (Norway) |

| 7 September 2010 | Germany | 6 – 1 | Azerbaijan | Cologne, Germany |
| 20:45 UTC+2 | Westermann 28'; Podolski 45+1'; Klose 45+2', 90+2'; Sadigov 53' (o.g.); Badstuber 86' | Report | Javadov 62' | Stadium: RheinEnergieStadion; Attendance: 43,751; Referee: Markus Strömbergsson (Sweden) |

| 8 October 2010 | Germany | 3 – 0 | Turkey | Berlin, Germany |
| 20:45 UTC+2 | Klose 42', 87'; Özil 79' | Report | | Stadium: Olympiastadion; Attendance: 74,228; Referee: Howard Webb (England) |

| 12 October 2010 | Kazakhstan | 0 – 3 | Germany | Astana, Kazakhstan |
| 23:00 UTC+6 | | Report | Klose 48'; Gómez 76'; Podolski 85' | Stadium: Astana Arena; Attendance: 20,000; Referee: Alexandru Dan Tudor (Romania) |

| 26 March 2011 | Germany | 4 – 0 | Kazakhstan | Kaiserslautern, Germany |
| 20:00 UTC+1 | Klose 3', 88'; Müller 25', 43' | Report | | Stadium: Fritz-Walter-Stadion; Attendance: 47,984; Referee: Aleksandar Stavrev (Macedonia) |

| 3 June 2011 | Austria | 1 – 2 | Germany | Vienna, Austria |
| 20:30 UTC+2 | Friedrich 51' (o.g.) | Report | Gómez 44', 90' | Stadium: Ernst Happel Stadion; Attendance: 47,500; Referee: Massimo Busacca (Switzerland) |

| 7 June 2011 | Azerbaijan | 1 – 3 | Germany | Baku, Azerbaijan |
| 19:00 UTC+2 | Hüseynov 89' | Report | Özil 30'; Gómez 41'; Schürrle 90+3' | Stadium: Tofik Bakhramov Stadium; Attendance: 30,000; Referee: Michael Koukoulakis (Greece) |

== Women's national team ==
As hosts of the 2011 FIFA World Cup, Germany did not have to play qualifying.

=== Friendlies ===
The home team is on the left column; the away team is on the right column.

| 15 September 2010 | Germany | 5 – 0 | Canada | Dresden, Germany |
| 18:00 CEST | Grings 2' (pen.); Bajramaj 54'; Popp 76'; Behringer 79'; Okoyino da Mbabi 83' | Report | | Stadium: Rudolf-Harbig-Stadion; Attendance: 20,431; Referee: Dagmar Damkova (Czech Republic) |

| 28 October 2010 | Germany | 2 – 1 | Australia | Wolfsburg, Germany |
| 18:00 CEST | Grings 36'; Müller 71' | Report | Kerr 28' | Stadium: Volkswagen Arena; Attendance: 7,229; Referee: Tanja Schett (Austria) |

| 25 November 2010 | Germany | 8 – 0 | Nigeria | Leverkusen, Germany |
| 18:00 CET | Grings 5', 10'; Garefrekes 9', 71', 79'; Prinz 19', 42'; Popp 62' | Report | | Stadium: BayArena; Attendance: 8,100; Referee: Christina Pedersen (Norway) |

| 21 May 2011 | Germany | 2 – 0 | North Korea | Ingolstadt, Germany |
| 17:00 CEST | Kulig 59' (pen.); Okoyino da Mbabi 85' | Report | | Stadium: Audi Sportpark; Attendance: 8,756; Referee: Tanja Schett (Austria) |

| 3 June 2011 | Germany | 5 – 0 | Italy | Osnabrück, Germany |
| 18:00 CEST | D'Adda 32' (o.g.); Popp 46', 77'; Kulig 62'; Okoyino da Mbabi 69' | Report | | Stadium: Osnatel-Arena; Attendance: 12,080; Referee: Saša Ihringová (England) |

| 7 June 2011 | Germany | 5 – 0 | Netherlands | Aachen, Germany |
| 16:30 CEST | Okoyino da Mbabi 15'; Laudehr 43'; Popp 71'; Kulig 75'; Grings 87' | Report | | Stadium: New Tivoli; Attendance: 11,136; Referee: Saša Ihringová (England) |

| 16 June 2011 | Germany | 3 – 0 | Norway | Mainz, Germany |
| 20:30 CEST | Laudehr 79'; Popp 80', 82' | Report | | Stadium: Coface Arena; Attendance: 13,812; Referee: Hong (South Korea) |

=== 2011 FIFA Women's World Cup ===
| 26 June 2011 | Germany | 2 – 1 | Canada | Berlin, Germany |
| 18:00 CEST | Garefrekes 10'; Okoyino da Mbabi 42' | Report | Sinclair 82' | Stadium: Olympiastadion; Attendance: 73,680; Referee: Jacqui Melksham (Australia) |

| 30 June 2011 | Germany | 1 – 0 | Nigeria | Frankfurt, Germany |
| 20:45 CEST | Laudehr 54' | Report | | Stadium: Commerzbank-Arena; Attendance: 48,817; Referee: Cha Sung Mi (Korea Republic) |

| 5 July 2011 | France | 2 – 4 | Germany | Mönchengladbach, Germany |
| 20:45 CEST | Delie 56'; Georges 72' | Report | Garefrekes 25'; Grings 32', 68' (pen.); Okoyino da Mbabi 88' | Stadium: Borussia-Park; Attendance: 45,867; Referee: Kirsi Heikkinen (Finland) |

| 9 July 2011 | Germany | 0 – 1 (a.e.t.) | Japan | Wolfsburg, Germany |
| 20:45 CEST | Maruyama 108' | Report | | Stadium: Volkswagen-Arena; Attendance: 26,067; Referee: Quetzalli Alvarado (Mexico) |

== League season ==
=== Bundesliga ===
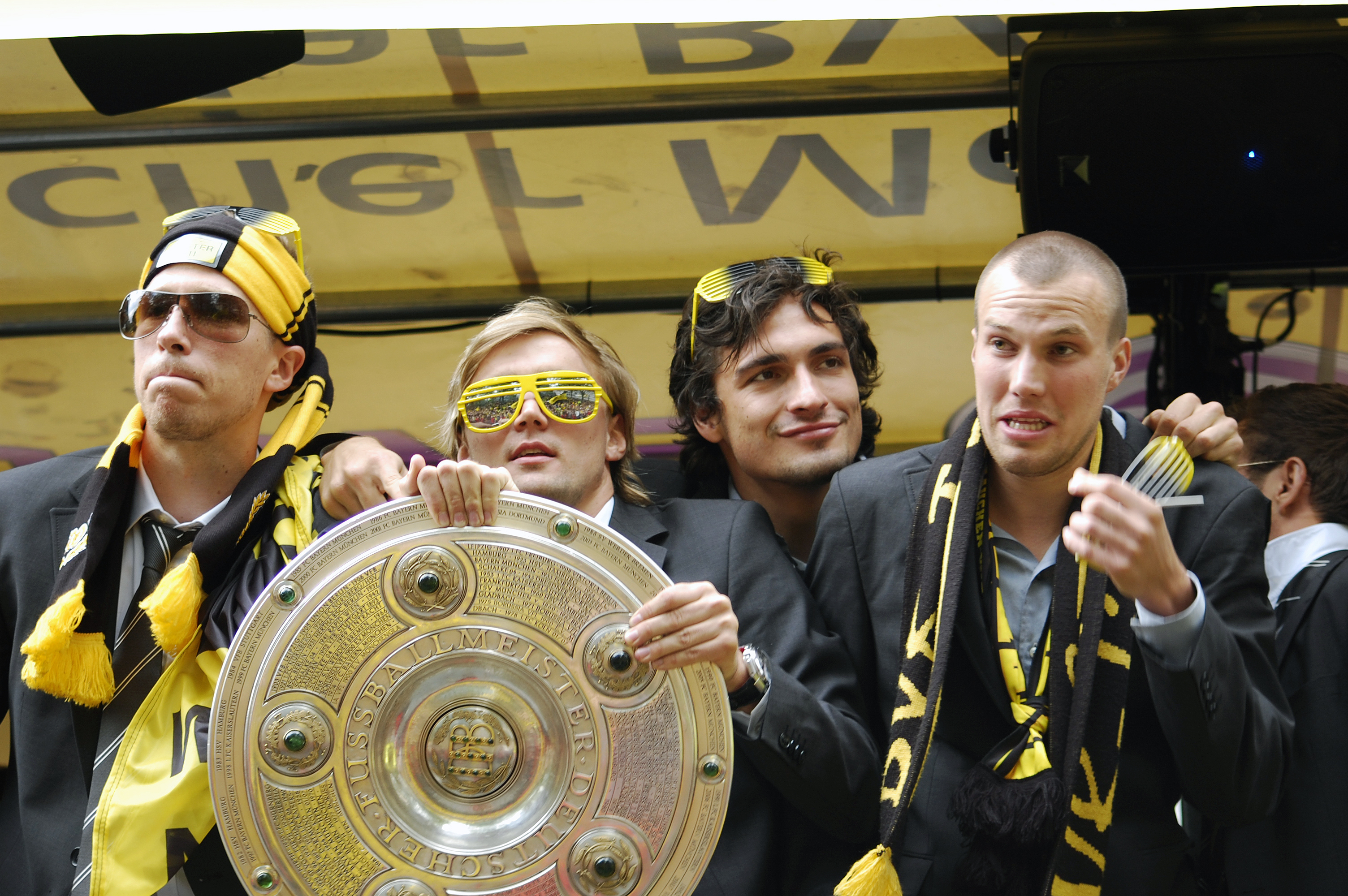
Marco Stiepermann, Marcel Schmelzer, Mats Hummels and Kevin Großkreutz celebrate winning the Bundesliga with Borussia Dortmund in 2011

| Pos | Team | Pld | W | D | L | GF | GA | GD | Pts | Qualification or relegation |
|---|---|---|---|---|---|---|---|---|---|---|
| 1 | Borussia Dortmund (C) | 34 | 23 | 6 | 5 | 67 | 22 | +45 | 75 | Qualification to Champions League group stage |
| 2 | Bayer Leverkusen | 34 | 20 | 8 | 6 | 64 | 44 | +20 | 68 | Qualification to Champions League group stage |
| 3 | Bayern Munich | 34 | 19 | 8 | 7 | 81 | 40 | +41 | 65 | Qualification to Champions League play-off round |
| 4 | Hannover 96 | 34 | 19 | 3 | 12 | 49 | 45 | +4 | 60 | Qualification to Europa League play-off round |
| 5 | FSV Mainz 05 | 34 | 18 | 4 | 12 | 52 | 39 | +13 | 58 | Qualification to Europa League third qualifying round |
| 6 | 1. FC Nürnberg | 34 | 13 | 8 | 13 | 47 | 45 | +2 | 47 | |
| 7 | 1. FC Kaiserslautern | 34 | 13 | 7 | 14 | 48 | 51 | −3 | 46 | |
| 8 | Hamburger SV | 34 | 12 | 9 | 13 | 46 | 52 | −6 | 45 | |
| 9 | SC Freiburg | 34 | 13 | 5 | 16 | 41 | 50 | −9 | 44 | |
| 10 | 1. FC Köln | 34 | 13 | 5 | 16 | 47 | 62 | −15 | 44 | |
| 11 | 1899 Hoffenheim | 34 | 11 | 10 | 13 | 50 | 50 | 0 | 43 | |
| 12 | VfB Stuttgart | 34 | 12 | 6 | 16 | 60 | 59 | +1 | 42 | |
| 13 | Werder Bremen | 34 | 10 | 11 | 13 | 47 | 61 | −14 | 41 | |
| 14 | Schalke 04 | 34 | 11 | 7 | 16 | 38 | 44 | −6 | 40 | Qualification to Europa League play-off round (Note: Schalke 04 as winners of the 2010–11 DFB-Pokal qualified for the play-off round of the 2011–12 UEFA Europa League.) |
| 15 | VfL Wolfsburg | 34 | 9 | 11 | 14 | 43 | 48 | −5 | 38 | |
| 16 | Borussia Mönchengladbach (O) | 34 | 10 | 6 | 18 | 48 | 65 | −17 | 36 | Qualification to relegation play-offs |
| 17 | Eintracht Frankfurt (R) | 34 | 9 | 7 | 18 | 31 | 49 | −18 | 34 | Relegation to 2. Bundesliga |
| 18 | FC St. Pauli (R) | 34 | 8 | 5 | 21 | 35 | 68 | −33 | 29 | Relegation to 2. Bundesliga |

Source: kicker
Rules for classification: 1) points; 2) goal difference; 3) number of goals scored.
(C) Champions; (O) Play-off winners; (R) Relegated

=== 2. Bundesliga ===
| Pos | Team | Pld | W | D | L | GF | GA | GD | Pts | Promotion, qualification or relegation |
|---|---|---|---|---|---|---|---|---|---|---|
| 1 | Hertha BSC (C, P) | 34 | 23 | 5 | 6 | 69 | 28 | +41 | 74 | Promotion to Bundesliga |
| 2 | FC Augsburg (P) | 34 | 19 | 8 | 7 | 58 | 27 | +31 | 65 | Promotion to Bundesliga |
| 3 | VfL Bochum | 34 | 20 | 5 | 9 | 49 | 35 | +14 | 65 | Qualification for promotion play-offs |
| 4 | Greuther Fürth | 34 | 17 | 10 | 7 | 47 | 27 | +20 | 61 | |
| 5 | Erzgebirge Aue | 34 | 16 | 8 | 10 | 40 | 37 | +3 | 56 | |
| 6 | Energie Cottbus | 34 | 16 | 7 | 11 | 65 | 52 | +13 | 55 | |
| 7 | Fortuna Düsseldorf | 34 | 16 | 5 | 13 | 49 | 39 | +10 | 53 | |
| 8 | MSV Duisburg | 34 | 15 | 7 | 12 | 53 | 38 | +15 | 52 | |
| 9 | 1860 Munich | 34 | 14 | 10 | 10 | 50 | 36 | +14 | 50 (Note: 1860 Munich were deducted two points because of providing insufficient information during the licensing process previous to this season.) | |
| 10 | Alemannia Aachen | 34 | 13 | 9 | 12 | 58 | 60 | −2 | 48 | |
| 11 | Union Berlin | 34 | 11 | 9 | 14 | 39 | 45 | −6 | 42 | |
| 12 | SC Paderborn | 34 | 10 | 9 | 15 | 32 | 47 | −15 | 39 | |
| 13 | FSV Frankfurt | 34 | 11 | 5 | 18 | 42 | 54 | −12 | 38 | |
| 14 | FC Ingolstadt | 34 | 9 | 10 | 15 | 40 | 46 | −6 | 37 | |
| 15 | Karlsruher SC | 34 | 8 | 9 | 17 | 46 | 72 | −26 | 33 | |
| 16 | VfL Osnabrück (R) | 34 | 8 | 7 | 19 | 40 | 62 | −22 | 31 | Qualification for relegation play-offs |
| 17 | Rot-Weiß Oberhausen (R) | 34 | 7 | 7 | 20 | 30 | 65 | −35 | 28 | Relegation to 3. Liga |
| 18 | Arminia Bielefeld (R) | 34 | 4 | 8 | 22 | 28 | 65 | −37 | 17 (Note: Arminia Bielefeld were deducted three points because of accessing league security funds worth €1.25M.) | Relegation to 3. Liga |

Source: bundesliga.de
Rules for classification: 1) points; 2) goal difference; 3) number of goals scored.
(C) Champions; (P) Promoted; (R) Relegated

=== 3. Liga ===
| Pos | Team | Pld | W | D | L | GF | GA | GD | Pts | Promotion, qualification or relegation |
|---|---|---|---|---|---|---|---|---|---|---|
| 1 | Eintracht Braunschweig (C, P) | 38 | 26 | 7 | 5 | 81 | 22 | +59 | 85 | Promotion to 2. Bundesliga and qualification for DFB-Pokal |
| 2 | Hansa Rostock (P) | 38 | 24 | 6 | 8 | 70 | 36 | +34 | 78 | Promotion to 2. Bundesliga and qualification for DFB-Pokal |
| 3 | Dynamo Dresden (O, P) | 38 | 19 | 8 | 11 | 55 | 37 | +18 | 65 | Qualification to promotion play-offs and DFB-Pokal |
| 4 | Wehen Wiesbaden | 38 | 18 | 10 | 10 | 55 | 39 | +16 | 64 | Qualification for DFB-Pokal |
| 5 | Rot-Weiß Erfurt | 38 | 18 | 7 | 13 | 63 | 45 | +18 | 61 | |
| 6 | 1. FC Saarbrücken | 38 | 17 | 8 | 13 | 61 | 51 | +10 | 59 | |
| 7 | Kickers Offenbach | 38 | 16 | 9 | 13 | 52 | 45 | +7 | 57 | |
| 8 | Jahn Regensburg | 38 | 13 | 13 | 12 | 35 | 41 | −6 | 52 | |
| 9 | 1. FC Heidenheim | 38 | 14 | 9 | 15 | 59 | 58 | +1 | 51 | |
| 10 | VfB Stuttgart II (Note: Reserve teams are ineligible for promotion or DFB-Pokal qualification.) | 38 | 12 | 15 | 11 | 48 | 48 | 0 | 51 | |
| 11 | TuS Koblenz (R) | 38 | 13 | 10 | 15 | 38 | 46 | −8 | 49 | Relegation to Regionalliga (Note: Koblenz voluntarily withdrew their participation following being unable to generate an adequate budget for the season.) |
| 12 | SV Sandhausen | 38 | 11 | 13 | 14 | 43 | 46 | −3 | 46 | |
| 13 | SV Babelsberg 03 | 38 | 12 | 10 | 16 | 39 | 47 | −8 | 46 | |
| 14 | SpVgg Unterhaching | 38 | 11 | 12 | 15 | 39 | 55 | −16 | 45 | |
| 15 | Carl Zeiss Jena | 38 | 11 | 11 | 16 | 43 | 62 | −19 | 44 | |
| 16 | VfR Aalen | 38 | 9 | 14 | 15 | 40 | 52 | −12 | 41 | |
| 17 | Wacker Burghausen | 38 | 9 | 10 | 19 | 46 | 66 | −20 | 37 | |
| 18 | Werder Bremen II | 38 | 8 | 12 | 18 | 33 | 56 | −23 | 36 | |
| 19 | Bayern Munich II (R) | 38 | 7 | 9 | 22 | 30 | 54 | −24 | 30 | Relegation to Regionalliga |
| 20 | Rot Weiss Ahlen (Note: Rot Weiss Ahlen were docked three points for violations within the licensing process.) (R) | 38 | 11 | 9 | 18 | 45 | 69 | −24 | 39 | Relegation to NRW-Liga (Note: Rot Weiss Ahlen filed for administration after the conclusion of the season and therefore were automatically demoted and put into last place. Shortly afterwards, the club announced that it will enter the fifth-tier NRW-Liga for the 2011–12 season.) |

Source: kicker
Rules for classification: 1) points; 2) goal difference; 3) number of goals scored.
(C) Champions; (O) Play-off winners; (P) Promoted; (R) Relegated

=== Bundesliga (women) ===
| Pos | Team | Pld | W | D | L | GF | GA | GD | Pts | Qualification or relegation |
|---|---|---|---|---|---|---|---|---|---|---|
| 1 | Turbine Potsdam (C) | 22 | 19 | 1 | 2 | 67 | 17 | +50 | 58 | 2011–12 UEFA Champions League Round of 32 |
| 2 | FFC Frankfurt | 22 | 19 | 0 | 3 | 103 | 16 | +87 | 57 | 2011–12 UEFA Champions League Round of 32 |
| 3 | FCR 2001 Duisburg | 22 | 16 | 3 | 3 | 61 | 19 | +42 | 51 | |
| 4 | Hamburg | 22 | 12 | 2 | 8 | 42 | 42 | 0 | 38 | |
| 5 | Bayern Munich | 22 | 11 | 2 | 9 | 43 | 36 | +7 | 35 | |
| 6 | Bad Neuenahr | 22 | 11 | 0 | 11 | 54 | 48 | +6 | 33 | |
| 7 | Wolfsburg | 22 | 10 | 2 | 10 | 52 | 46 | +6 | 32 | |
| 8 | Bayer Leverkusen | 22 | 6 | 3 | 13 | 32 | 67 | −35 | 21 | |
| 9 | Essen-Schönebeck | 22 | 5 | 5 | 12 | 27 | 50 | −23 | 20 | |
| 10 | Jena | 22 | 5 | 4 | 13 | 24 | 57 | −33 | 19 | |
| 11 | Saarbrücken (R) | 22 | 4 | 2 | 16 | 20 | 72 | −52 | 14 | Relegation to 2011–12 2. Bundesliga |
| 12 | Herford (R) | 22 | 1 | 2 | 19 | 25 | 80 | −55 | 5 | Relegation to 2011–12 2. Bundesliga |

Updated to match(es) played on 13 March 2011. Source: dfb.de (in German)
Rules for classification: 1) points; 2) goal difference; 3) number of goals scored.
(C) Champions; (R) Relegated

=== 2. Bundesliga (women) ===
Note: Reserve teams from Fußball-Bundesliga sides were not eligible for promotion.

North
| Pos | Team | Pld | W | D | L | GF | GA | GD | Pts | Promotion or relegation |
|---|---|---|---|---|---|---|---|---|---|---|
| 1 | Hamburg II | 22 | 17 | 5 | 0 | 57 | 18 | +39 | 56 | Withdrew (Note: Hamburg II withdrew from the league due to financial concerns) |
| 2 | 1. FC Lokomotive Leipzig | 22 | 17 | 2 | 3 | 54 | 20 | +34 | 53 | Promoted to the Fußball-Bundesliga (women) |
| 3 | Turbine Potsdam II | 22 | 13 | 5 | 4 | 59 | 25 | +34 | 44 | |
| 4 | 1. FC Lübars (Note: Promoted from the Regionalliga last season) | 22 | 12 | 3 | 7 | 43 | 30 | +13 | 39 | |
| 5 | Werder Bremen | 22 | 11 | 3 | 8 | 35 | 29 | +6 | 36 | |
| 6 | SV Victoria Gersten | 22 | 9 | 4 | 9 | 30 | 31 | −1 | 31 | |
| 7 | FFC Oldesloe 2000 | 22 | 7 | 6 | 9 | 29 | 33 | −4 | 27 | |
| 8 | FSV Gütersloh 2009 | 22 | 7 | 5 | 10 | 30 | 33 | −3 | 26 | |
| 9 | Magdeburger FFC | 22 | 4 | 7 | 11 | 23 | 32 | −9 | 19 | |
| 10 | BV Cloppenburg | 22 | 3 | 6 | 13 | 15 | 45 | −30 | 15 | |
| 11 | Tennis Borussia Berlin (Note: Relegated from the Bundesliga last season) | 22 | 3 | 3 | 16 | 14 | 58 | −44 | 12 | Relegated to the new Fußball-Regionalliga (women) |
| 12 | Holstein Kiel | 22 | 2 | 5 | 15 | 12 | 47 | −35 | 11 | Relegated to the new Fußball-Regionalliga (women) |

Source: Kicker.de (in German)
Rules for classification: 1) points; 2) goal difference; 3) number of goals scored.
Notes:

South
| Pos | Team | Pld | W | D | L | GF | GA | GD | Pts | Promotion or relegation |
|---|---|---|---|---|---|---|---|---|---|---|
| 1 | SC Freiburg (Note: Relegated from the Bundesliga last season) | 22 | 20 | 0 | 2 | 80 | 8 | +72 | 60 | Promoted to the Fußball-Bundesliga (women) |
| 2 | 1. FC Köln | 22 | 16 | 3 | 3 | 74 | 19 | +55 | 51 | |
| 3 | 1899 Hoffenheim (Note: Promoted from the Regionalliga last season) | 22 | 13 | 4 | 5 | 46 | 22 | +24 | 43 | |
| 4 | TSV Crailsheim | 22 | 9 | 6 | 7 | 25 | 28 | −3 | 33 | |
| 5 | VfL Sindelfingen | 22 | 9 | 4 | 9 | 32 | 37 | −5 | 31 | |
| 6 | FCR 2001 Duisburg II | 22 | 8 | 4 | 10 | 29 | 35 | −6 | 28 | |
| 7 | FFC Niederkirchen | 22 | 8 | 4 | 10 | 37 | 51 | −14 | 28 | |
| 8 | Bayern Munich II | 22 | 8 | 2 | 12 | 40 | 40 | 0 | 26 | |
| 9 | FFC Frankfurt II | 22 | 7 | 3 | 12 | 29 | 45 | −16 | 24 | |
| 10 | FV Löchgau | 22 | 6 | 4 | 12 | 18 | 37 | −19 | 22 | |
| 11 | SC Sand | 22 | 7 | 0 | 15 | 25 | 46 | −21 | 21 | Relegated to the new Fußball-Regionalliga (women) |
| 12 | FFC Recklinghausen | 22 | 2 | 4 | 16 | 18 | 85 | −67 | 10 | Relegated to the new Fußball-Regionalliga (women) |

Source: Kicker.de (in German)
Rules for classification: 1) points; 2) goal difference; 3) number of goals scored.

== Retirements ==
- 7 December 2010 – Oliver Neuville, 37, striker for Arminia Bielefeld, Bayer Leverkusen, Hansa Rostock, and Borussia Mönchengladbach. Born in Switzerland, Neuville began his career there playing for Servette FC, and played for CD Tenerife in Spain before coming to Germany. From 1998 to 2008, he earned 69 caps for the German national team.

== Deaths ==
- 3 July 2010 – Herbert Erhardt, 79, defender for Bayern Munich and Greuther Fürth. He was a member of the 1954 West Germany World Cup-winning squad, as well as the 1958 and 1962 World Cup squads.
- 19 August 2010 – Johannes Riedl, 60, player for 1. FC Kaiserslautern and MSV Duisburg among others.
- 22 October 2010 – Franz Raschid, 56, midfielder for Bayer 05 Uerdingen and manager for Arminia Bielefeld.
- 12 December 2010 – Peter Pagel, 54, striker for Tennis Borussia Berlin and Hertha BSC.
- 11 February 2011 – Willi Gerdau, 81, midfielder for Heider SV. He earned one cap with the West Germany national team.
- 11 February 2011 – Josef Pirrung, 61, player for 1. FC Kaiserslautern and Wormatia Worms who earned two caps for the West Germany national team.
- 13 February 2011 – Edgar Burkart, 66, former president of Greuther Fürth.
- 28 February 2011 – Günter Mast, 84, former president of Eintracht Braunschweig.
- 18 June 2011 – Ulrich Biesinger, 77, forward for BC Augsburg and others. He was a member of the 1954 World Cup-winning West Germany squad.
