= Christian Clemens =

German footballer (born 1991)

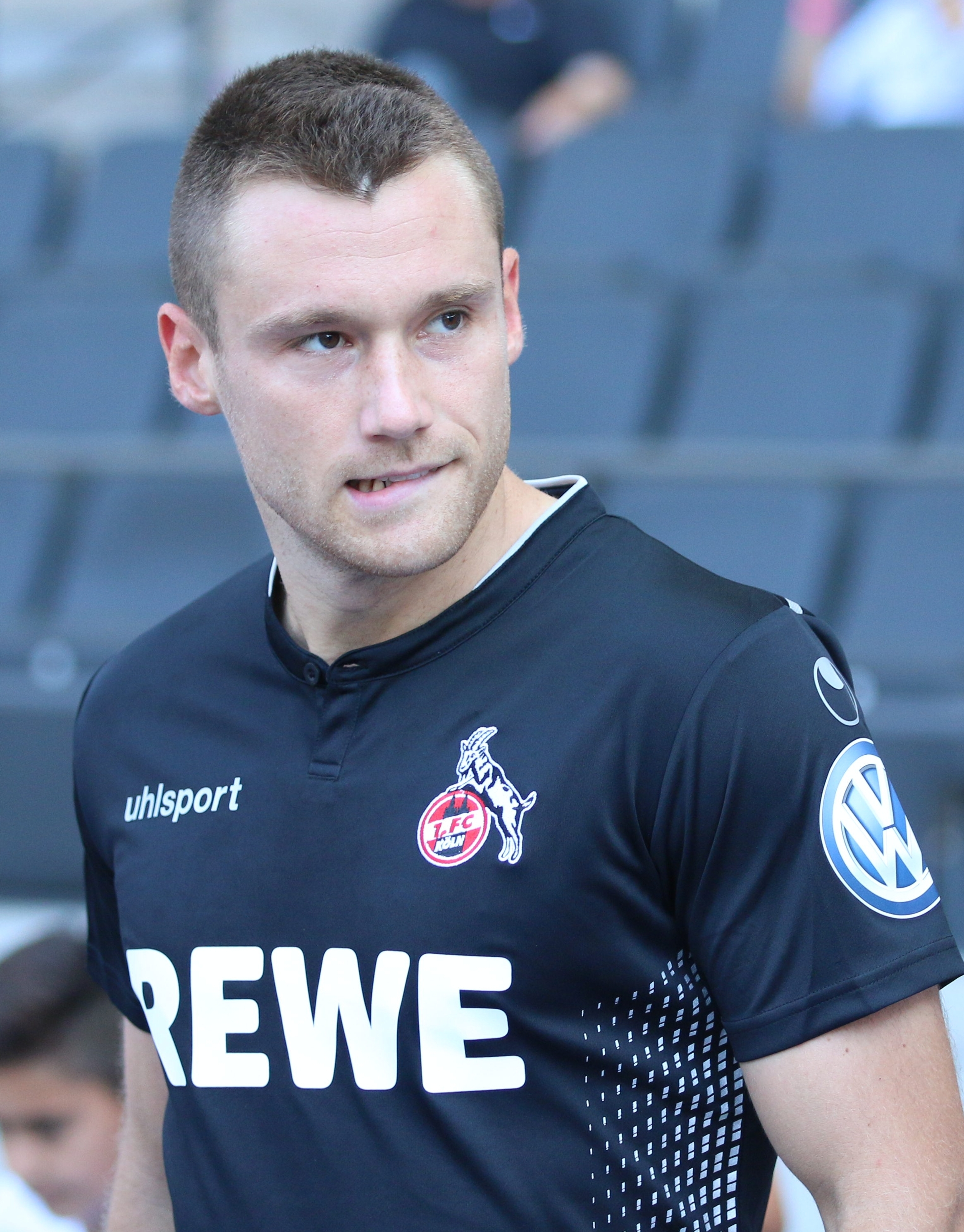
- Clemens in 2018

Personal information
- Date of birth: 4 August 1991 (age 35)
- Place of birth: Cologne, Germany
- Height: 1.80 m (5 ft 11 in)
- Position: Winger

Youth career
- 1997–2001: SC Köln Weiler-Volkhoven
- 2001–2009: 1. FC Köln

Senior career*
Years	Team	Apps	(Gls)
2009–2010	1. FC Köln II	11	(0)
2010–2013	1. FC Köln	89	(13)
2013–2016	Schalke 04	19	(0)
2015–2016	→ Mainz 05 (loan)	37	(6)
2016	Mainz 05	3	(0)
2017–2021	1. FC Köln	47	(4)
2020	1. FC Köln II	7	(0)
2021	Darmstadt 98	14	(1)
2022–2023	Lechia Gdańsk	22	(1)
2023–2024	1. FC Düren	34	(2)
Total		283	(27)

International career
2007	Germany U16	7	(0)
2007–2008	Germany U17	7	(0)
2008–2009	Germany U18	10	(3)
2009–2010	Germany U19	5	(2)
2010–2011	Germany U20	3	(2)
2011–2013	Germany U21	6	(0)
- * Club domestic league appearances and goals

Christian Clemens (German pronunciation: [ˈkʁɪs.tɪ.an ˈklɛ.məns]; born 4 August 1991) is a German former professional footballer who played as a winger.

== Club career ==
=== 1. FC Köln ===
Clemens started his career with SC Weiler-Volkhoven, joined 1. FC Köln at the age of ten and progressed through the club's youth system. In July 2009, he was promoted to the 1. FC Köln II.

After previously been called up the first team as an unused substitute in the last game of the season against Nürnberg in the 2009–10 season, Clemens made his first-team debut in a 1–0 win against FC St. Pauli. Following the match, Goal.com praised Clemens' debut, having "switched off from the midfield several times on the offensive, unsettled the Pauli four-chain." Clemens quickly got involved in the first team in number of matches as the season goes by. On 11 December 2010, he scored his first goal for the club in a 1–0 win against Eintracht Frankfurt. Clemens then scored his second goal for the club on 5 February 2011, in a 3–2 win over Bayern Munich. Clemens' performance in his first season at the club earned him a contract extension on 30 March 2011. Despite suffering from an injury, relating to the stress response of the bone that kept him out for the rest of the season, Clemens finished the 2010–11 season, making thirty appearances and scoring two times in all competitions.

In the 2011–12 season, Clemens returned to the first team when he made his first appearance since returning from injury, in a 5–1 loss against Schalke 04 on 13 August 2011. Weeks later, Clemens scored his first goal of the season on 27 August 2011, in a 4–3 win over Hamburger SV. He started the season, coming on as a substitute, in number of matches, which he acknowledged. Clemens then scored, as well as, setting up one of the goals, in a 3–2 loss against Werder Bremen on 5 November 2011; then scoring twice on 10 December 2011, in a 4–0 win over SC Freiburg. It was not until 10 March 2012 when he scored his fifth goal of the season, in a 1–0 win over Hertha BSC. However, Clemens was unable to help the club avoid relegation to 2. Bundesliga next season. Despite this, Clemens finished the 2011–12 season, making thirty-three appearances and scoring two times in all competitions.

Following the club's relegation to 2. Bundesliga, Clemens missed the 2012–13 season, due to a ruptured intramuscular ligament initiation in the ankle during a friendly match against Heerenveen. It was not until on 27 August 2012 when he made his first appearance of the season, in a 2–0 loss against Erzgebirge Aue. After missing out one match, Clemens scored on his return, in a 3–3 draw against 1. FC Kaiserslautern on 26 October 2012. From 10 December 2012 to 3 March 2013, Clemens scored five goals in eight matches in all competitions, including goals against Eintracht Braunschweig, VfB Stuttgart and St. Pauli. Clemens' performance later in the 2012–13 season earned him Player of the Month on three occasion. Clemens went on to make thirty-three appearances and scoring seven times in all competitions. For his performance the whole season, Clemens was awarded the club's Player of the Year Award.

Following the end of the 2012–13 season, Clemens was linked with a move to Schalke 04 for the 2013–14 Bundesliga season. It was later revealed that he has an exit clause that allows him to leave the club. With his departure increasingly slim, Clemens played his last home again for the club, where he scored in a 2–1 loss against Hertha BC on 12 May 2013. Clemens' move to Schalke 04 was confirmed on 17 June 2013.

=== Schalke 04 ===
On 17 June 2013, Schalke 04 confirmed that Christian Clemens had signed a four-year contract with them until 30 June 2017. The transfer fee was reported as €3 million by the Schalke Sport and Communications manager Horst Heldt. Upon joining the club, Clemens was assigned a number 11 shirt, previously worn by Ibrahim Afellay.

Clemens made his debut for the club, in the opening game of the season, where he played the whole game and set up one of the goals, in a 3–3 draw against Hamburger SV. In the second round of DFB-Pokal, Clemens set one of the goals, in a 3–1 win over Darmstadt 98 to progress to the next round. Clemens remained in the first team at the start of the season until he suffered a strain on his muscle thigh. Clemens returned to the first team from injury on 7 December 2013, in a 2–1 loss against Borussia Mönchengladbach. However, Clemens suffered a stubborn palsy problems that kept him out for the rest of the season.

Ahead of the 2014–15 season, Clemens continued to recover from his injury, but suffered a muscle fiber tears in the pre-season. Soon, he began to recover quickly the following month and made his first appearance on 18 August 2014, in the first round of DFB-Pokal, with a 2–1 loss against Dynamo Dresden. However, Clemens struggled to regain his first team place since returning from injury at Schalke 04.

=== Mainz 05 ===
On 6 January 2015, Clemens left Schalke 04 to join Bundesliga's rival Mainz 05 on loan, until the end of the 2015–16 season. The move also includes an option to sign him on a permanent basis.

Clemens made his Mainz 05 debut on 31 January 2015, where he played the whole game, in a 5–0 win over SC Paderborn. Clemens then scored his first goal for the club on 21 February 2015, in a 3–1 win over Eintracht Frankfurt. However, Clemens suffered injuries that kept him out throughout March and April. It was not until on 9 May 2015 when he made his first team return as a late substitute, in a 2–0 loss against Stuttgart. Despite injuries, Clemens finished the season, making ten appearances and scoring once in all competitions.

In the 2015–16 season, Clemens started the season well when he scored in the first round of DFL Pokal, as well as, setting up one of the goals, in a 3–1 win over Energie Cottbus and did the same thing weeks later on 23 August 2015, in a 2–1 win over Borussia Mönchengladbach. After suffering a plantar fascia that kept him out throughout October, Clemens returned and then scored his second goal on 5 December 2015, in a 3–1 win over Hamburger SV. He later scored three more goals later in the season, including a brace against FC Augsburg on 2 April 2016, which saw them win 4–2. Clemens finished the 2015–16 season, making twenty-nine appearances and scoring six times in all competitions.

Following this, Clemens joined the club on a permanent basis, keeping him until 2019 on 29 April 2016. Clemens hinted that he could leave the club in the summer. However, Clemens struggled to regain his first team since joining the club on a permanent basis, due to injuries and made six appearances in all competitions.

=== Return to 1. FC Köln ===
On 21 December 2016, Clemens joined 1. FC Köln for the second time, keeping him until 2021, where he will join up the club on 1 January 2017.

In a friendly match against VfL Bochum on 7 January 2017, Clemens scored in a 1–0 win. After the match, Clemens' performance was praised by manager Peter Stöger. He re-debut for the club in his second spell at 1. FC Köln, where he started the match, in a 0–0 draw against Mainz 05 on 22 January 2017. It was not until on 8 April 2017 when he scored in his second spell with the club, in a 3–2 loss against Borussia Mönchengladbach. Towards the end of the 2016–17 season, Clemens fought for his first team place since arriving in January and at occasions, he appeared on the substitute bench as a result. He went on to make fourteen appearances and scoring once for the side.

In the 2017–18 season, Clemens missed the first two matches, due to failing to make it in the starting eleven. He made his first appearance of the season, where he started the match, in a 3–1 loss against Hamburger SV on 25 August 2017. However, he spent two months on the sideline, due to failing to make it in the starting eleven and his own injury concerns. It was not until on 25 October 2017 when he scored his first goal of the season, in a 3–1 win over Hertha BSC in the second round of DFB–Pokal. By December, he soon began to have more playing time, mostly coming on as a substitute. This works out as he helped the side beat VfL Wolfsburg 1–0 to give the side their first win of the season. Towards the end of the 2017–18 season, Clemens, once again, was plagued with injuries. Shortly after sustaining another injury in April, the club was ultimately relegated to 2. Bundesliga for next season. At the end of the 2017–18 season, Clemens went on to make twenty appearances and scoring two times in all competitions.

In the 2018–19 season, with the club playing in the 2. Bundesliga, Clemens started the season well when he set up two goals, in a 2–0 win over VfL Bochum in the opening game of the season. In a follow-up match against Union Berlin on 13 August 2018, he scored his first goal of the season, in a 1–1 draw.

=== Darmstadt 98 ===
On 15 January 2021, Köln announced that the club had agreed to release Clemens from his contract and that he would join Darmstadt 98 with immediate effect.

=== Lechia Gdańsk ===
After leaving Darmstadt at the end of July 2021, he remained a free agent for over six months. On 3 February 2022, he signed his first contract abroad when he joined Polish Ekstraklasa club Lechia Gdańsk on a year-and-a-half deal. He left the club by mutual consent on 15 January 2023.

=== 1. FC Düren and retirement ===
In July 2024, after 1.5 seasons with Regionalliga West side 1. FC Düren, Clemens announced his retirement from playing.

== International career ==
Clemens previously played for several Germany national youth football teams. He started out on 16 February 2007 when made his Germany U16 debut, coming on as a second-half substitute, in a 2–2 draw against Czech Republic U16. Clemens went on to make seven appearances for the Germany U16 side.

After represented the Germany U17 side, Clemens made his Germany U18 debut on 18 November 2008 against Austria U18, where Germany U18 won 4–0. He didn't score his first goal for the U18 side until on 26 March 2009, in a 3–2 win over France U18. He went on to make ten appearances and scoring three times for the U17 side.

Clemens made his Germany U19 debut on 7 October 2009, where he scored the national side third goal, in a 3–0 win over Luxembourg U19. He went on to make five appearances and scoring twice for the U19 side.

On 6 September 2010, Clemens was called up by Germany U20 for the first time and on 6 September 2010 Clemens made his debut for the Germany U-20 national football team in a 3–2 victory over Switzerland in which Clemens also scored his first goal for the Germany U-20 national football team. It was not until August 2011 when he returned to the U20 squad and scored his first goal in almost twelve months for the side, in a 4–2 win over Poland U20 on 31 August 2011.

On 6 February 2011, Clemens received his first call-up to the Germany U-21 national football team for a match against the Greece U-21 national football team. On 9 February 2011, Clemens debuted for the Germany U-21 national football team in a friendly match against the Greece U-21 national football team, which saw them draw 0–0. Two years later, on 24 March 2013, Clemens was called by the Germany U21 once again and played 29 minutes after coming on as a substitute in the second half, in a 2–1 win over Israel U21. In the summer of 2013, Clemens was called by the U21 side once again for 2013 UEFA European Under-21 Championship and went on to make three appearances for the side, although they were eliminated in the group stage.

== Style of play ==
Clemens was mainly deployed as a winger and utilized on the left or right flanks on the football pitch; but Clemens could also be deployed as a second striker. Clemens himself sees his strengths on the flanks of the football pitch. Clemens possessed accurate heading and shooting of the ball, great agility and endurance, physical strength, rapid acceleration and speed. Clemens was a dummy specialist and a silky dribbler which Clemens utilized to bamboozle opposition defenders in one-on-one situations with ease.

== Personal life ==
Clemens has a younger brother, Michael Clemens, who plays for 1. FC Köln II. He was romantically involved with Lynn Mester from Bayer 04 Leverkusen.

== Career statistics ==
Appearances and goals by club, season and competition
Club	Season	League			Cup		Continental		Total	
Club	Season	Division	Apps	Goals	Apps	Goals	Apps	Goals	Apps	Goals
1. FC Köln II	2009–10	Regionalliga West	10	0	—		—		10	0
1. FC Köln II	2010–11	Regionalliga West	1	0	—		—		1	0
1. FC Köln II	Total		11	0	0	0	0	0	11	0
1. FC Köln	2010–11	Bundesliga	27	2	3	0	—		30	2
1. FC Köln	2011–12	Bundesliga	31	5	2	0	—		33	5
1. FC Köln	2012–13	2. Bundesliga	31	6	2	1	—		33	7
1. FC Köln	Total		89	13	7	1	0	0	96	14
Schalke 04	2013–14	Bundesliga	11	0	2	0	5	0	18	0
Schalke 04	2014–15	Bundesliga	8	0	1	0	1	0	10	0
Schalke 04	Total		19	0	3	0	6	0	28	0
Mainz 05 (loan)	2014–15	Bundesliga	9	1	—		—		9	1
Mainz 05 (loan)	2015–16	Bundesliga	28	5	1	1	—		29	6
Mainz 05 (loan)	Total		37	6	1	1	0	0	38	7
Mainz 05	2016–17	Bundesliga	3	0	1	0	2	0	6	0
1. FC Köln	2016–17	Bundesliga	12	1	0	0	—		12	1
1. FC Köln	2017–18	Bundesliga	14	1	2	1	4	0	20	2
1. FC Köln	2018–19	2. Bundesliga	20	2	1	0	—		21	2
1. FC Köln	2019–20	Bundesliga	1	0	0	0	—		1	0
1. FC Köln	Total		47	4	3	1	4	0	54	5
1. FC Köln II	2020–21	Regionalliga West	7	0	—		—		7	0
Darmstadt 98	2020–21	2. Bundesliga	14	1	1	0	—		15	1
Lechia Gdańsk	2021–22	Ekstraklasa	12	1	—		—		12	1
Lechia Gdańsk	2022–23	Ekstraklasa	10	0	0	0	4	0	14	0
Lechia Gdańsk	Total		22	1	0	0	4	0	26	1
1. FC Düren	2022–23	Regionalliga West	10	2	—		—		10	2
1. FC Düren	2023–24	Regionalliga West	24	0	—		—		24	0
1. FC Düren	Total		34	2	0	0	0	0	34	2
Career total			283	27	16	3	16	0	315	30
