= Andrezinho (footballer, born 1981) =

Brazilian footballer

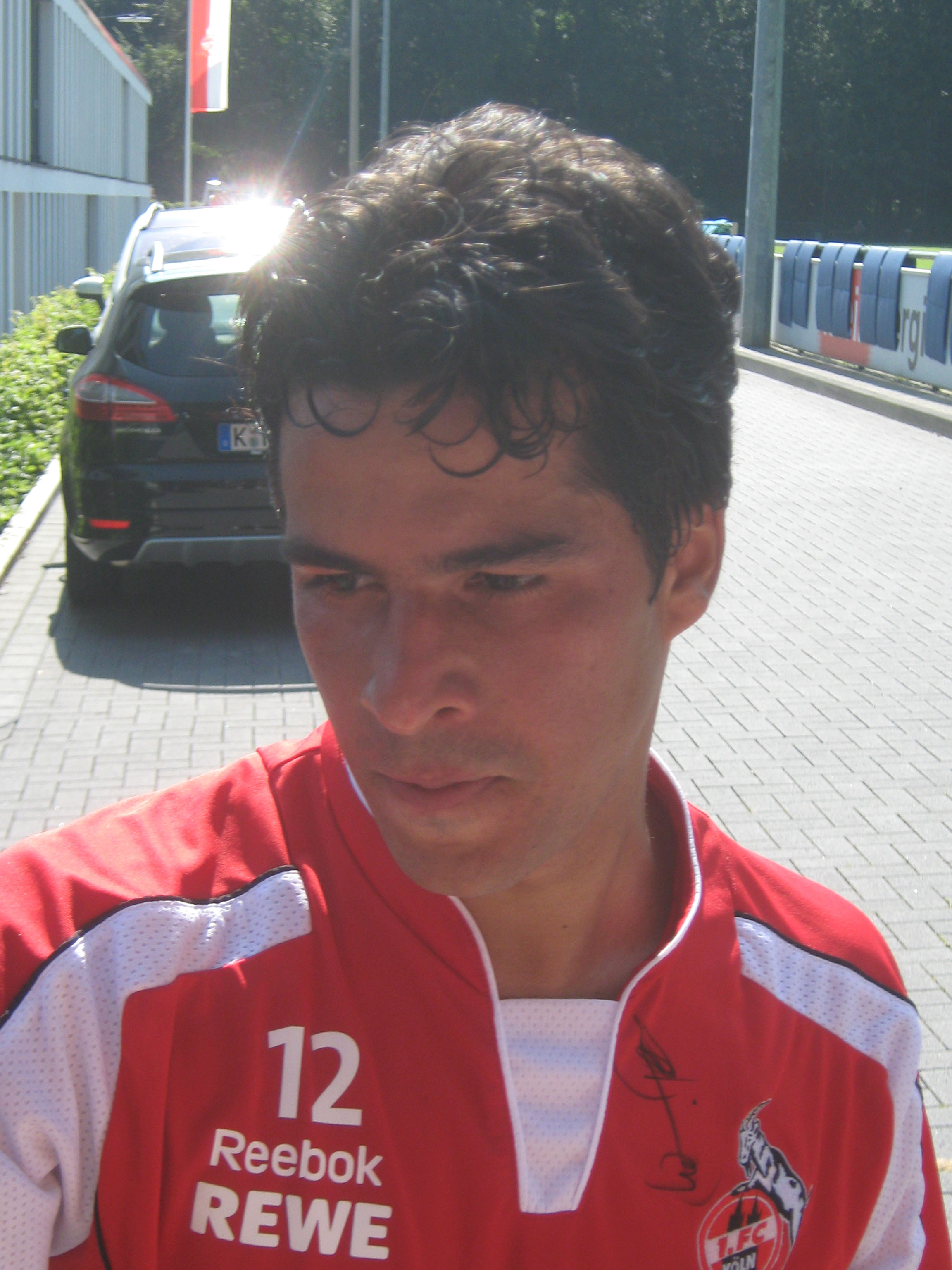
- Andrezinho during his time at 1. FC Köln

Personal information
- Full name: André Ricardo Soares
- Date of birth: 9 October 1981 (age 45)
- Place of birth: Mineiros, Brazil
- Height: 1.73 m (5 ft 8 in)
- Position: Full back

Senior career*
| Years | Team | Apps | (Gls) |
| 2001–2002 | Mineiros | | |
| 2003 | São Raimundo-AM | | |
| 2004 | Vila Nova | | |
| 2005 | Goiás | | |
| 2006 | Coritiba | 19 | (0) |
| 2007 | Vila Nova | | |
| 2007–2010 | Vitória Guimarães | 76 | (6) |
| 2010–2012 | 1. FC Köln | 15 | (0) |
| 2013 | Anápolis | 2 | (0) |
- * Club domestic league appearances and goals

André Ricardo Soares (born 9 October 1981), known as Andrezinho, is a Brazilian former professional footballer. Mainly a right-back, he was equally at ease on the left flank.

== Club career ==
Andrezinho was born in Mineiros, Goiás. After playing for five teams in his country in six years, he moved in July 2007 to Portugal with Vitória SC, as the Guimarães-based club had just returned from the second division.

An undisputed starter from the very beginning, Andrezinho only missed one game en route to a final third place in the Primeira Liga, with the subsequent qualification to the UEFA Champions League. In the 2009–10 season he enjoyed his best year as a professional, scoring five goals in 25 matches – often from free kicks– as Vitória finished in sixth position, narrowly missing out on a UEFA Europa League spot.

In late July 2010, Andrezinho joined 1. FC Köln in Germany, penning a two-year contract and reuniting with former Guimarães teammate Pedro Geromel. However, coach Frank Schaefer saw no perspective for him in a reorganised team, and advised him to leave in the following transfer window.
