= Taner Yalçın =

German footballer (born 1990)

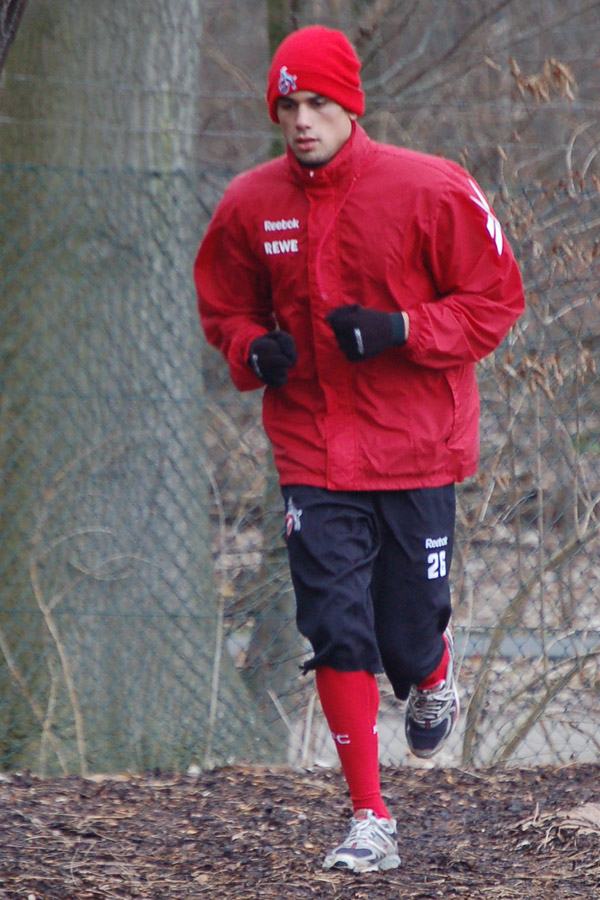
- Yalçın with 1. FC Köln

Personal information
- Date of birth: 18 February 1990 (age 36)
- Place of birth: Cologne, West Germany
- Height: 1.84 m (6 ft 0 in)
- Position: Midfielder

Team information
- Current team: SC 1960 Hanau (manager)

Youth career
- ESV Olympia Köln
- –2003: Fortuna Köln
- 2003–2008: 1. FC Köln

Senior career*
Years	Team	Apps	(Gls)
2008–2012	1. FC Köln	35	(1)
2011–2012	→ İstanbul BB (loan)	17	(1)
2012–2013	İstanbul BB	5	(0)
2013–2014	Kayserispor	13	(0)
2015	Elazığspor	17	(5)
2015–2016	Kayseri Erciyesspor	4	(0)
2016	Kastamonuspor	5	(0)
2016–2017	SV Sandhausen	1	(0)
2018–2019	İnegölspor	21	(2)
2019–2020	Sivas Belediyespor	10	(0)
2021–2023	FC Hürth	36	(0)
Total		164	(9)

International career
2007	Turkey U18	2	(1)
2007	Turkey U19	2	(0)
2008	Germany U19	4	(0)
2009	Germany U20	3	(1)
2010	Germany U21	1	(0)

Managerial career
- 2024–: SC 1960 Hanau
- * Club domestic league appearances and goals

Taner Yalçın (Turkish pronunciation: [ˈtanæɾ jaɫˈtʃɯn], born 18 February 1990) is a German former professional footballer who played as a midfielder. He manages SC 1960 Hanau.

== Club career ==
=== 1. FC Köln ===
In 2003, Yalçın moved from SC Fortuna Köln to 1. FC Köln. There, he won the 2008 Under 19 Bundesliga West (scored 15 goals in 21 games).

In may 2008, he signed a professional contract with 1. FC Köln until 2011, running from the summer 2008. Yalçın made his professional debut on Matchday 2 of the 2008–09 Bundesliga season in a home game against Eintracht Frankfurt. As the season progressed, he appeared on the pitch a total of 12 times.

After a very good pre-season ahead of the 2010–11 season, Yalçın established himself as a regular player in the early stages of the season. In the first round of the 2010–11 DFB-Pokal, he scored his first professional goal for 1. FC Köln. His first goal in the Bundesliga came on 12 September 2010, in a match against FC St. Pauli.

=== İstanbul BB ===
For the 2011–12 season, Yalçın was loaned out to Turkish TFF First League club İstanbul BB. Yalçın got his debut for İstanbul on 11 September 2011 in a match against Galatasaray. Yalçın was finally signed on a permanent basis in June 2012.

=== Kayserispor ===
After Istanbul BB was relegated from the Süper Lig for the 2013-14 season, Yalçın moved to TFF First League club Kayserispor in July 2013.

Yalçın hit the headlines in late April 2014 after he was shot in a shootout in a nightclub in Istanbul with other professional footballers such as Gökhan Töre, Hugo Almeida, and Manuel Fernandes. His club took this incident as an opportunity to terminate Yalçın's ongoing contract.

=== Later career ===
On the last day of the 2014–15 winter transfer window, Yalçın moved to Turkish TFF Second League club Elazığspor. In the summer of the same year, he then moved to Kayseri Erciyesspor.

In January 2016, he moved to Kastamonuspor for the second half of the 2015–16 season. He left the club again at the end of the season.

On 12 September 2016, Yalçın returned to Germany and joined SV Sandhausen on a one-year contract. He played his only 2. Bundesliga game for the club on 4 February 2017, a 2–0 win against Erzgebirge Aue, when he was on from the bench in the last minute. He also played several games for the second team in the Oberliga Baden-Württemberg. His contract expired in the summer 2017 and was not renewed.

After a year without club, Yalçın signed with TFF Third League club İnegölspor in July 2018. He left the club at the end of the season and then signed with Sivas Belediyespor in August 2019. In March 2020, he ended his contract early and returned to his hometown of Cologne.

Yalçın remained without club until July 2021, when he joined German Mittelrheinliga club FC Hürth.

He signed with SC Elsdorf of the lower-league Bezirksliga in July 2023.

== International career ==
Taner was born in Germany and is of Turkish descent. He has represented both Turkey and Germany at the youth level.

== Managerial career ==
In February 2024 Yalçın was appointed manager at Hessenliga club SC 1960 Hanau.
