= Alexandru Ioniță (footballer, born 1989) =

Romanian footballer

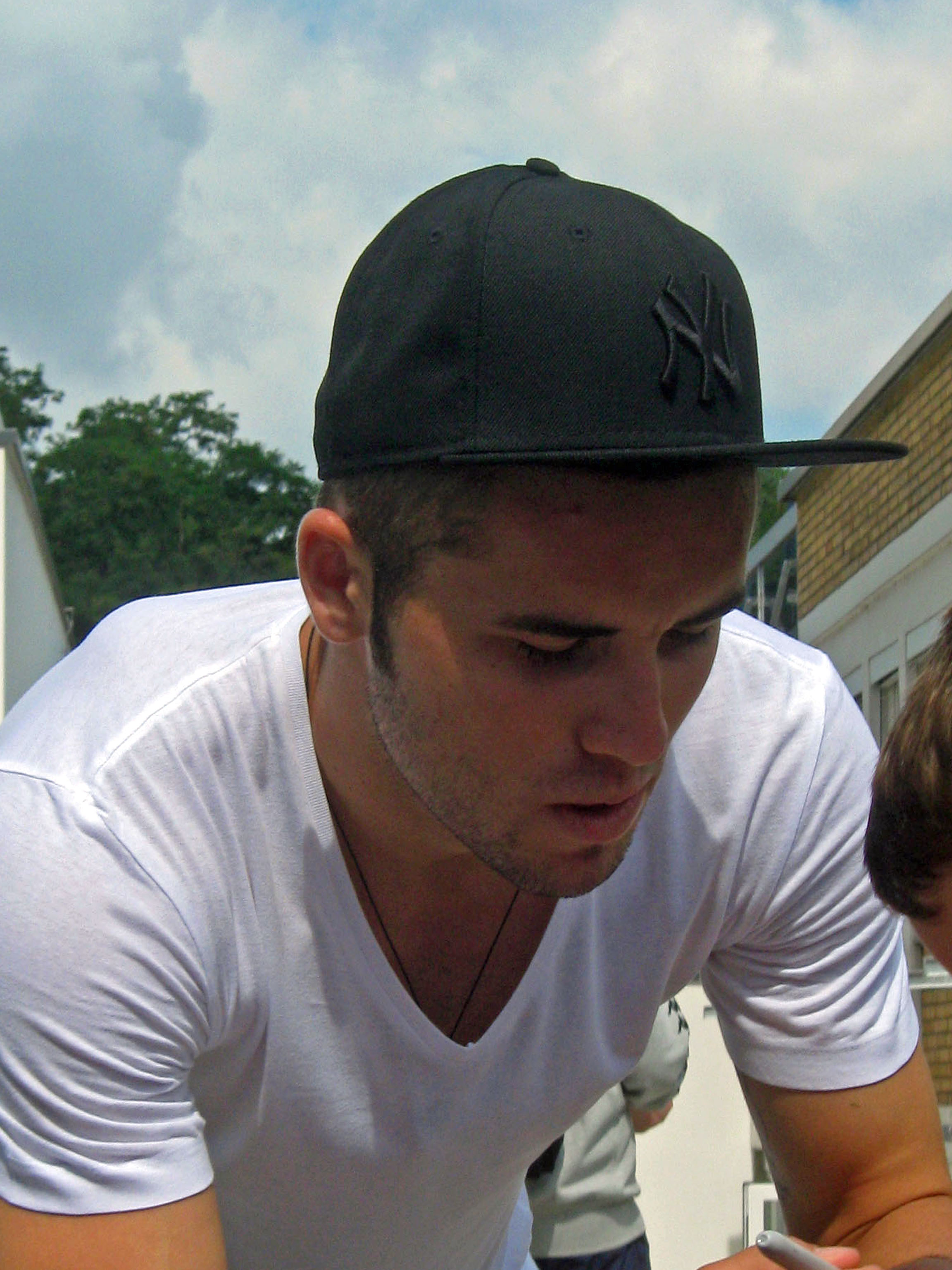
- Ioniță signing autographs in 2010

Personal information
- Full name: Alexandru Octavian Ioniță
- Date of birth: 5 August 1989 (age 37)
- Place of birth: Bucharest, Romania
- Height: 1.85 m (6 ft 1 in)
- Position: Forward

Youth career
- 1999–2005: Viscofil București
- 2005–2006: Rocar București

Senior career*
Years	Team	Apps	(Gls)
2006–2008	Rapid II București	23	(14)
2008–2009	→ Rocar București (loan)	9	(4)
2009–2010	Rapid București	28	(10)
2010–2012	1. FC Köln	7	(0)
2012–2013	→ Rapid București (loan)	23	(5)
2013–2014	Orduspor	24	(1)
2014–2015	AEL Limassol	13	(2)
2015	Voluntari	4	(0)
2016	Farul Constanța	10	(0)
2016	ASA Târgu Mureș	6	(1)
2017–2018	Aris Limassol	17	(4)
2018–2019	Sportul Snagov	23	(10)
2019–2020	UTA Arad	34	(6)
2021–2022	Rapid București	14	(0)
Total		234	(57)

International career
2009–2011	Romania U21	8	(0)

Managerial career
- 2022–: Rapid București (youth)
- * Club domestic league appearances and goals

Alexandru Octavian Ioniță (Romanian pronunciation: [alekˈsandru oktaviˈan joˈnitsə]); born 5 August 1989) is a Romanian former professional footballer who played as a forward.

== Club career ==
Ioniţă began his youth career in the summer of 1999, when he joined Viscofil București.

=== Rapid București ===
In summer 2006, he was scouted by Rapid București, where he initially played for the reserve team. In 2008, he was loaned to Rocar București for which he scored four goals from nine games.

In February 2010 he was transferred to German side 1. FC Köln for a fee of €2.5 million, but he remained at Rapid București until 1 July 2010.

=== 1. FC Köln ===
Ioniţă signed a four-year contract. He had limited playing time at Köln in his first season. In May 2011, he suffered a ligament injury in his right ankle which kept him out of action for several months. Therefore, he made only seven league appearances during the 2010–11 season.

In January 2012 after his return from injury, Ioniţă was loaned back to Rapid București for six months, with the Bucharest team having the first option to buy the player for €800,000.

He then moved in Turkey signing a one-year contract with the Turkish side Ordurspor. In 2014, he moved in Cyprus and signed with AEL Limassol. He returned in Romania due to family reasons, where he had spells with Voluntari and ASA Târgu Mureș. On 13 January 2017, he parted ways with ASA Târgu Mureș, citing financial instability of the Romanian clubs.

== Honours ==
UTA Arad

- Liga II: 2019–20
