= Martin Lanig =

German footballer (born 1984)

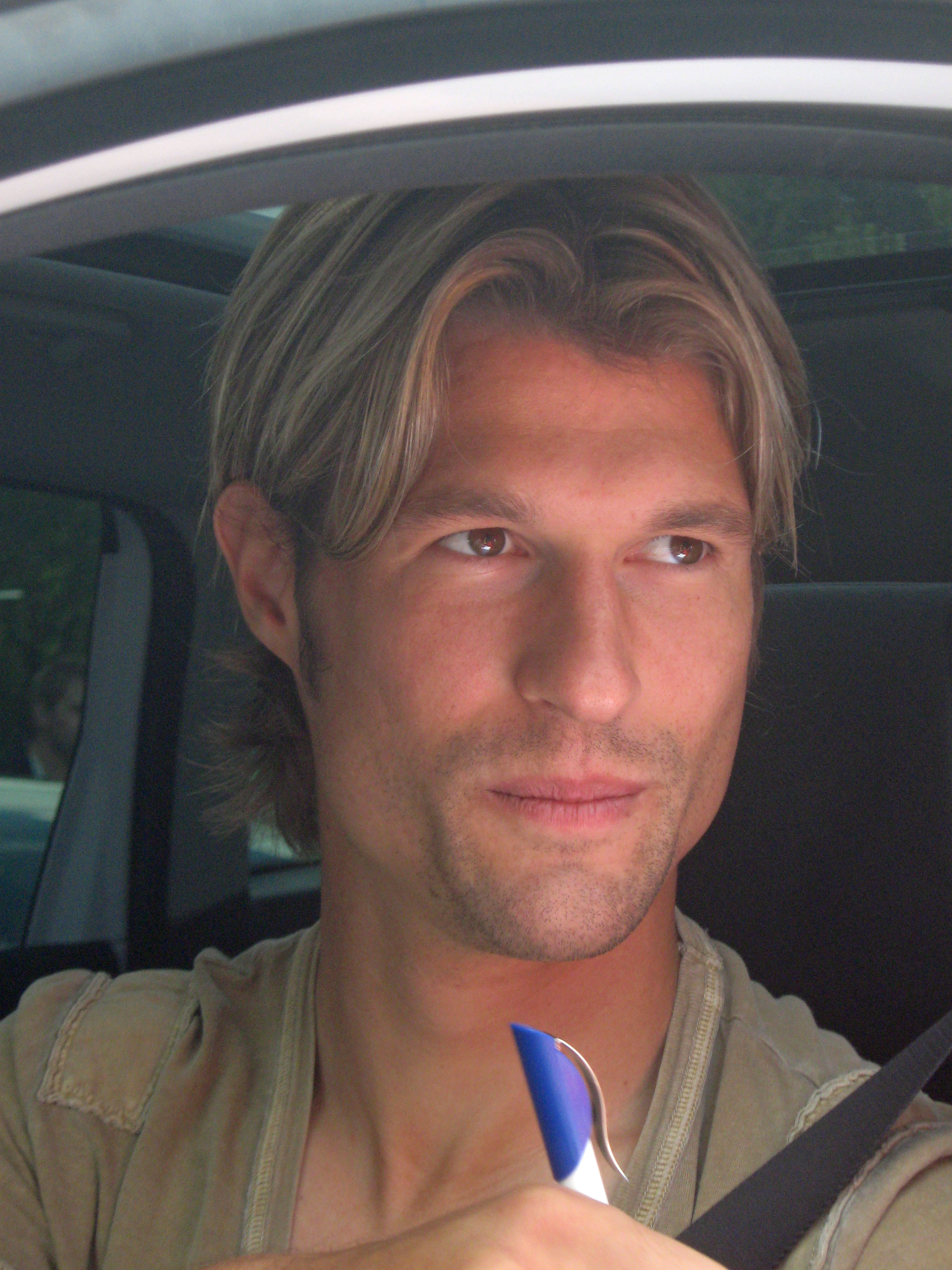

Personal information
- Date of birth: 11 July 1984 (age 42)
- Place of birth: Bad Mergentheim, West Germany
- Height: 1.90 m (6 ft 3 in)
- Position: Defensive midfielder

Youth career
- 1989–: SV Königshofen
- –1999: TSV Tauberbischofsheim
- 1999–2001: 1. FC Nürnberg

Senior career*
Years	Team	Apps	(Gls)
2002–2003	FV Lauda	31	(3)
2003–2005	1899 Hoffenheim II	20	(5)
2003–2006	1899 Hoffenheim	66	(5)
2006–2008	Greuther Fürth	54	(11)
2008–2010	VfB Stuttgart	27	(4)
2010	VfB Stuttgart II	3	(0)
2010–2012	1. FC Köln	59	(2)
2012–2015	Eintracht Frankfurt	37	(4)
2015	APOEL	13	(2)
Total		259	(28)

Managerial career
- 2023–2024: FSV Hollenbach
- 2024–2025: Würzburger Kickers
- * Club domestic league appearances and goals

Martin Lanig (born 11 July 1984) is a German professional football coach and a former defensive midfielder.

== Career ==
=== Youth squads ===
Lanig began playing for SV Königshofen. Later he played for TSV Tauberbischofsheim and 1. FC Nürnberg.

=== FV Lauda, Hoffenheim, Greuther Fürth ===
Lanig started his career with lower division team FV Lauda in 2002. The next year he moved to the Regionalliga Süd club TSG 1899 Hoffenheim and in 2006 he signed with the 2. Bundesliga club SpVgg Greuther Fürth.

=== VfB Stuttgart, FC Köln, Eintracht Frankfurt ===
In July 2008, he transferred from Greuther Fürth to VfB Stuttgart, where he had the opportunity to play for the first time in the Bundesliga. Lanig scored his first goal for VfB Stuttgart on 5 October 2008 against Werder Bremen.

In July 2010, he moved to 1. FC Köln and two years later he transferred to Eintracht Frankfurt.

=== APOEL ===
On 23 January 2015, aged 30, Lanig moved abroad for the first time and signed an 18-month contract with Cypriot club APOEL FC. He made his debut on 31 January 2015, playing the full 90 minutes in APOEL's 1–0 away victory against Nea Salamina in the Cypriot First Division. He scored his first official goal for APOEL on 7 February 2015, opening the scoreline in his team's 4–0 home win over Ethnikos Achna in the First Division. In his first season at APOEL, Lanig managed to win his first two career titles, as his team won both the Cypriot championship and the cup. On 16 June 2015, APOEL announced that Lanig's contract with the club was terminated by mutual consent, as the player wanted to return to Germany. APOEL was the last stop of his playing career, as a few months later, he announced his retirement from football at age 31, due to multiple and serious injuries.

=== Coaching career ===
In January 2023 he became assistant manager of FSV Hollenbach. A couple of months later, he was made head coach of the club.

On 3 April 2024, Lanig was sacked by Hollenbach. On 22 September 2024, he was announced as the new manager of Würzburger Kickers. He was dismissed by Kickers on 24 April 2025.

== Career statistics ==
Appearances and goals by club, season and competition
Club	Season	League			National cup		Continental (Note: Includes UEFA Champions League and UEFA Europa League matches.)		Total	
Club	Season	Division	Apps	Goals	Apps	Goals	Apps	Goals	Apps	Goals
1899 Hoffenheim	2003–04	Regionalliga Süd	7	0	0	0	—		7	0
1899 Hoffenheim	2004–05	Regionalliga Süd	28	2	1	0	—		29	2
1899 Hoffenheim	2005–06	Regionalliga Süd	31	3	1	0	—		32	3
1899 Hoffenheim	Total		66	5	2	0	—		68	5
Greuther Fürth	2006–07	2. Bundesliga	26	1	3	0	—		29	1
Greuther Fürth	2007–08	2. Bundesliga	28	10	2	0	—		30	10
Greuther Fürth	Total		54	11	5	0	—		59	11
VfB Stuttgart	2008–09	Bundesliga	26	4	3	1	9	1	38	6
VfB Stuttgart	2009–10	Bundesliga	1	0	1	0	0	0	2	0
VfB Stuttgart	Total		27	4	4	1	9	1	40	6
VfB Stuttgart II	2009–10	3. Liga	3	0	—		—		3	0
1. FC Köln	2010–11	Bundesliga	28	2	3	1	—		31	3
1. FC Köln	2011–12	Bundesliga	31	0	2	0	—		33	0
1. FC Köln	Total		59	2	5	1	—		64	3
Eintracht Frankfurt	2012–13	Bundesliga	19	3	0	0	—		19	3
Eintracht Frankfurt	2013–14	Bundesliga	15	1	1	0	5	1	21	2
Eintracht Frankfurt	2014–15	Bundesliga	3	0	1	0	—		4	0
Eintracht Frankfurt	Total		37	4	2	0	5	1	44	5
APOEL	2014–15	Cypriot First Division	13	2	4	1	—		17	3
Career total			259	28	22	3	14	2	295	33

== Honours ==
APOEL

- Cypriot First Division: 2014–15
- Cypriot Cup: 2014–15
