= Kevin Pezzoni =

German footballer (born 1989)

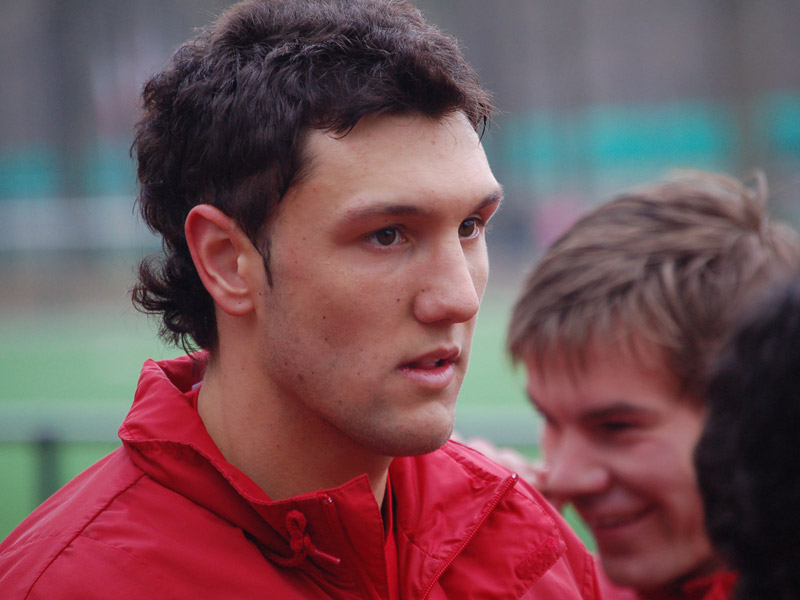
- Pezzoni with 1. FC Köln

Personal information
- Date of birth: 22 March 1989 (age 37)
- Place of birth: Frankfurt, West Germany
- Height: 1.85 m (6 ft 1 in)
- Position: Defender

Youth career
- Rot-Weiß Walldorf
- 1999–2001: Darmstadt 98
- 2001–2003: Eintracht Frankfurt
- 2003–2008: Blackburn Rovers

Senior career*
Years	Team	Apps	(Gls)
2008–2012	1. FC Köln	90	(3)
2012–2014	Erzgebirge Aue	21	(1)
2014	1. FC Saarbrücken	15	(0)
2014–2015	FC Wohlen	29	(2)
2015–2018	Wehen Wiesbaden	75	(3)
2018	Apollon Smyrnis	0	(0)
2018–2019	Hessen Dreieich	19	(1)
2019–2020	Kickers Offenbach	13	(0)
2020	FC Gießen	3	(0)
2020–2023	SG Bad Soden		

International career
	Germany U19	8	(0)
	Germany U20	2	(0)
	Germany U21	1	(0)
- * Club domestic league appearances and goals

Kevin Pezzoni (born 22 March 1989) is a German former professional footballer who played as a defender. He was capped by various German youth national teams including the Germany U21. His normal position is defense, although he can also play in midfield.

== Career ==
Pezzoni spent five years at the Blackburn Rovers youth academy, along with other German youth players Mahmadi Keita and Sergio Peter before signing for 1. FC Köln in January 2008.

Pezzoni played 90 games for Köln, scoring three goals, before he had his contract terminated by mutual agreement with 1. FC Köln on 1 September 2012 after incidents with hooligan supporters of the club. Pezzoni started training for a Hertha BSC after his release.

On 21 December 2012, it was revealed that Pezzoni had signed with 2. Bundesliga side FC Erzgebirge Aue. Pezzoni's contract was dissolved in January 2014 and he signed a new contract with 3. Liga side 1. FC Saarbrücken. After Saarbrücken were relegated at the end of the 2013–14 season, he left the club and signed for FC Wohlen.

In June 2019, it was announced Pezzoni would join Regionalliga Südwest side Kickers Offenbach from SC Hessen Dreieich, who were relegated from the league at the end of the 2018–19 season, for the 2019–20 season.
