= Frank Schaefer (football manager) =

German football manager (born 1963)

Frank Schaefer (born 26 October 1963, in Cologne) is a German football manager. He took over as head coach of Bundesliga team 1. FC Köln on 24 October 2010. He resigned 27 April 2011. On 12 April 2012, he took over as the head coach for 1. FC Köln again and this time until the end of the season. FC Köln was relegated to 2nd Bundesliga.

== Coaching career record ==
As of 11 May 2012

Team	From	To	Record				
Team	From	To	G	W	D	L	Win %
1.FC Köln II	1 July 2007	24 October 2010	113	56	32	25	49.56
1. FC Köln	24 October 2010	27 April 2011	24	10	3	11	41.67
1. FC Köln	12 April 2012	14 May 2012^{1}	4	0	1	3	0.00
Total			141	66	36	39	46.81

- 1.Frank Schaefer was interim head coach. Holger Stanislawski was hired as head coach on 14 May 2012.
