= Kačaniklić =

Kačaniklić Serbian Cyrillic: Качаниклић, is a Serbian surname. Notable people with the surname include:

- Alexander Kačaniklić (born 1991), Swedish footballer
- Robin Kačaniklić (born 1988), Swedish footballer, brother of Alexander
