= Sascha Riether =

German footballer (born 1983)

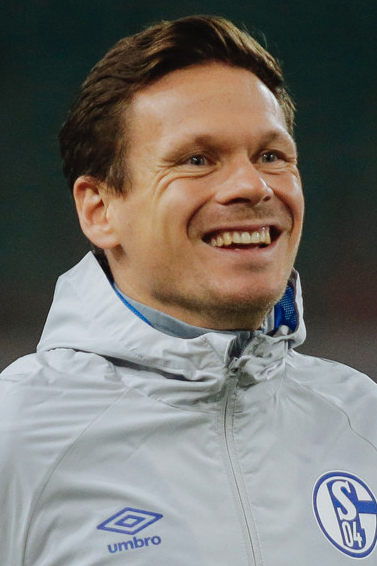
- Riether in 2018

Personal information
- Full name: Sascha Riether
- Date of birth: 23 March 1983 (age 43)
- Place of birth: Lahr, West Germany
- Height: 1.74 m (5 ft 9 in)
- Position: Right-back

Youth career
- 1987–1995: FV Kuhbach
- 1995–1998: Offenburger FV
- 1998–2002: SC Freiburg

Senior career*
Years	Team	Apps	(Gls)
2002–2007	SC Freiburg	139	(4)
2007–2011	VfL Wolfsburg	116	(6)
2011–2013	1. FC Köln	33	(0)
2012–2013	→ Fulham (loan)	35	(1)
2013–2014	Fulham	31	(0)
2014–2015	SC Freiburg	19	(0)
2015–2019	Schalke 04	23	(0)
Total		396	(11)

International career
2002	Germany U20	2	(0)
2003–2006	Germany U21	20	(0)
2010	Germany	2	(0)
- * Club domestic league appearances and goals

Sascha Riether (German pronunciation: [ˈzaʃa ˈʁiːtɐ]; born 23 March 1983) is a German former professional footballer who played as a right back. In addition to playing in the right-back position, Riether has also played in defensive midfield, center back and right midfield positions throughout his whole career.

His then U19 manager Uli Stielike described him in his early career as "very disciplined, versatile player, strong on the right side." During his playing career, Riether was known for his high commitment during the match and was considered a player who was more inclined to horizontal passes instead of creating chances with long passes. After announcing his retirement from professional football, he was appointed as Schalke 04's first coordinator for the licensed players department and worked for the role for two years before being relieved of duties in February 2021.

== Club career ==
=== SC Freiburg ===
Born in Lahr, West Germany, Riether came from a football family in which his father and older brother and started playing football when he was four years old. Riether then started his football career at B-youth of SC Freiburg before he joined the side in July 1998. Riether previously was at the youth teams of FV Kuhbach (now SC Kuhbach-Reichenbach) and Offenburger FV.

After progressing through the ranks at SC Freiburg for the next four years including some matches for the reserve team in 2001/02 at the 4th level, Riether's reward was earned when he signed his first professional contract with the club. Riether started his professional club career in the 2. Bundesliga ahead of the 2002–03 season. He made his SC Freiburg debut in the opening game of the season, a 1–0 win over Alemannia Aachen. Since making his debut for SC Freiburg, he quickly established himself in the first-team for the club, replacing Tobias Willi in the right-back position. Over the season, Riether was praised for his good performance in a number of matches. However, during a 4–0 win against Rot Weiss Ahlen on 9 February 2003, he suffered a "suffered a thick foot with a bruise" despite playing the whole game. After the match, it was announced that Riether was sidelined for two months. But he made his return on 25 April 2003, coming on as a second–half substitute, in a 4–0 loss against SpVgg Greuther Fürth. His return later contributed Freiburg become champions and secure promotion back into the Bundesliga. At the end of the 2002–03 season, Riether he appeared in 23 league games (26 appearances in all competitions) in his first season at the club.

In the 2003–04 season, Riether started the season well when he scored in the opening game of the season, in a 4–1 loss against Bayer Leverkusen. Riether started the start of the season, rotating in playing either the right–back position and defensive midfield position. Riether also an ever-present for the side until he missed one match, due to suspension. After serving a one match suspension, Riether returned to the starting line–up against 1. FC Köln on 27 March 2004 and scored his second goal of the season, in a 3–0 win. He then scored his third goal of the season, scoring from a header, in a 4–1 win against Hannover 96 on 1 May 2004. Riether went on to become the club's top performers and helped the side survive in the Bundesliga, finishing 13th place. At the end of the 2003–04 season, he went on to make 36 appearances and scoring three times in all competitions. Shortly after the end of the season, Riether signed a contract extension with SC Freiburg.

At the start of the 2004–05 season, Riether continued to feature in the defensive–midfield position for the side. He then scored in the second round of DFB-Pokal, in a 3–2 win over VfL Bochum after the game went extra–time. Riether then rotated in playing in different positions, such as, centre–back and then right–back position, which he did for the rest of the season. He then scored his second goal of the season, on 6 February 2005, in a 3–2 loss against Borussia Mönchengladbach. However, during a 1–0 loss against Bayern Munich on 26 February 2005, Riether suffered a knee injury and was substituted in the 28th minute. After the match, it was announced that he was sidelined for two months. Riether previously suffered an injury during the season, but quickly made a recovery. While on the sidelines, the club were relegated back to 2. Bundesliga after losing 3–1 against Arminia Bielefeld on 22 April 2005. But he made his return to the first team against Werder Bremen on 14 May 2005, coming on as a 77th-minute substitute, in a 4–1 loss. At the end of the 2004–05 season, Riether finished the season, making the twenty–seven appearances and scoring two times in all competitions.

At the start of the 2005–06 season, Riether set up a goal for Aleksandr Iashvili to score the only goal of the game, in a 1–0 win against Sportfreunde Siegen in the first round of the DFB–Pokal. He resumed his first team place in the midfield position, playing in the first five league matches. In a match against Karlsruher SC on 11 September 2005, however, he suffered an injury and was substituted in the 11th minute, as SC Freiburg drew 0–0. But Riether made his return to the starting line–up against Eintracht Braunschweig on 2 October 2005 and played the whole game, as the club drew 0–0. However, his return was short–lived when he suffered another injury and was substituted in the 21st minute, as SC Freiburg won 3–1 against 1. FC Saarbrücken on 16 October 2005. But Riether made his return to the starting line–up against Energie Cottbus on 30 October 2005 and played 82 minutes before substituted, in a 4–1 win. By December, Riether began to play in different positions, rotating in playing either in centre–back position, right–back positions and back to defensive midfield position for the rest of the 2005–06 season. However, the club failed to bounce back to Bundesliga after finishing fourth place in the league. Despite being sidelined two more times later in the 2005–06 season, he finished the season, making 31 appearances in all competition.

Ahead of the 2006–07 season, Riether signed a contract with the club, keeping his contract running until 2009. He started the season, rotating in playing either the right–back position and then in midfield position. After missing one match, Riether made his return to the starting line–up, in a 1–1 draw against MSV Duisburg on 13 October 2006. Following his return from absent, he continued to regain his first team place, playing in either defensive midfield position and centre–back position. Once again, SC Freiburg failed to secure promotion to Bundesliga after finishing fourth place in the league. Despite missing two matches later in the 2006–07 season, Riether went on to make thirty–one appearances in all competitions. During his five seasons with the club, Riether made 151 appearances and scoring five times.

=== VfL Wolfsburg ===
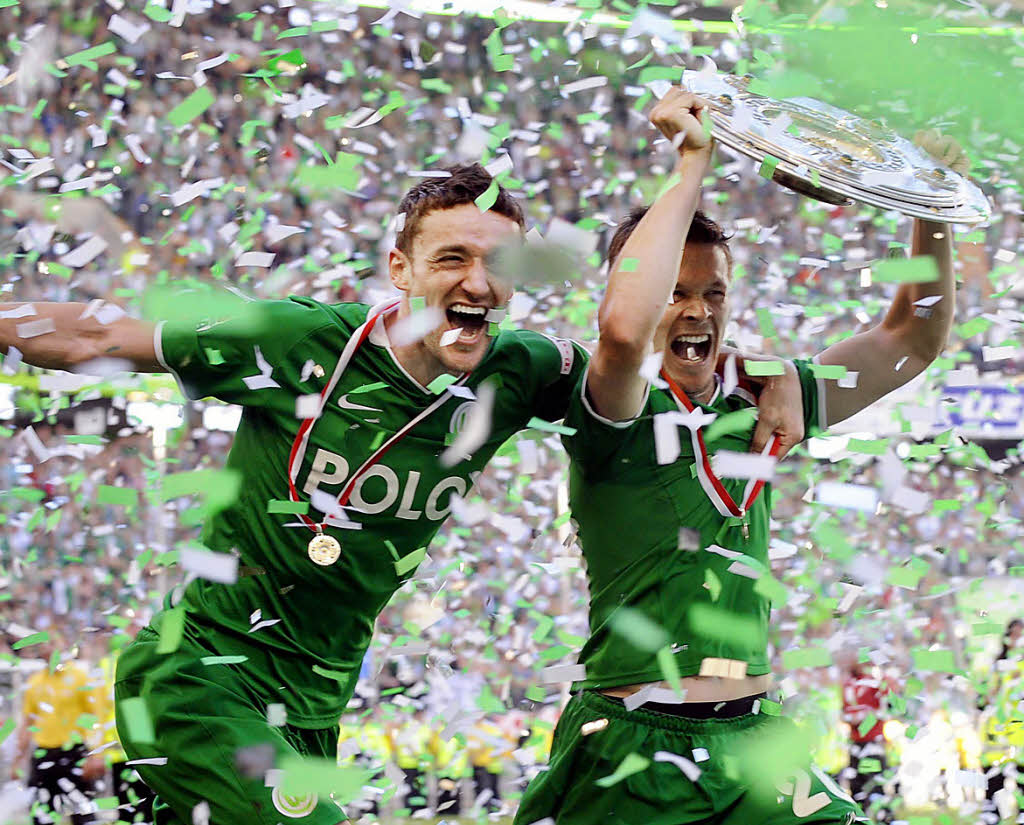
Riether celebrating with then teammate Christian Gentner after helping VfL Wolfsburg win their first Bundesliga title in 2008–09 season.

Riether stayed with Freiburg until July 2007 when he was signed by Bundesliga side VfL Wolfsburg for €500,000 and signing a three–year contract. Manager Felix Magath said he saw the player signing as "an alternative for the back right."

Riether made his debut for Wolfsburg, starting the whole game, in the right–back position, in a 3–1 loss against Arminia Bielefeld in the opening game of the season. Since making his debut for the club, he quickly established himself in the first team, playing in the right–back position. At times, Riether rotated into playing different position at either midfield position and centre–back position. After missing two matches due to a thigh injury, he returned to the starting line–up against Bayer Leverkusen on 27 April 2008 and started the whole game, as Wolfsburg drew 2–2. In the last game of the season, Riether scored his first goal for the club, in a 4–2 win over Borussia Dortmund, a win that saw Wolfsburg qualify for the UEFA Cup for next season. At the end of the 2007–08 season, he went on to make thirty–two appearances and scoring once in all competitions at his first season at the club.

Ahead of the 2008–09 season, Riether was expected to compete with Cristian Zaccardo over the right–back position, though he stated his preference to play in the midfield position. In the opening game of the season against 1. FC Köln, Riether came on as a second-half substitute for Zaccardo and set up a goal for Christian Gentner, who scored an equaliser, as Wolfsburg went on to win 2–1 at the end of the game. Since the start of the 2008–09 season, he regained his first team place in the right–back position, putting Zaccardo on the substitute bench at the start of the season. On 13 September 2008, Riether scored his first goal of the season, when he scored in injury time, in a 2–2 draw against Hertha BSC. Five days later, on 18 September 2008, he made his UEFA Cup debut, starting the whole game, in a 1–0 win over Rapid București; the club went on to go through to the group stage after drawing 1–1 in the return leg. However, Riether soon suffered injuries on two separate occasions between November and March. After returning from injury, he made his first appearance on 21 March 2009, in a 3–0 win over Arminia Bielefeld. Due to Zaccardo's playing time in the right–back position, Riether occasionally played in the midfield position, which he later played more active role later in the season. Riether was instrumental in the campaign, featuring in 28 league games as part of a solid defense helping his side record 10 straight Bundesliga victories, including a memorable 5–1 thrashing of Bayern Munich. He also helped on the attacking side of the undefeated run, scoring the game winner against Borussia Mönchengladbach on 11 April 2009. Riether went on to help the club achieve their first Bundesliga title in 2008–09 season after beating Werder Bremen 5–1 in the last game of the season. At the end of the 2008–09 season, he went on to make 37 appearances and scoring two times in all competitions. Shortly after the end of the season, Riether signed a contract extension, keeping him until 2012.

In the 2009–10 season, Riether started the season well when he set up two goals in two matches, both were a win against VfB Stuttgart and 1. FC Köln. He continued to regain his first team place at the club, playing in the right–back position following Zaccardo's departure back to Italy. Riether then made his UEFA Champions League debut on Matchday 1 Group Stage, in a 3–1 win over CSKA Moscow. He went on to make six Champions League appearances, as they were eliminated in the Group Stage. A week later on 23 September 2009, Riether scored his first goal for the club, in a 3–2 loss against 1. FC Köln in the second round of DFB-Pokal. In the second half of the season, he began rotating in playing either the right–back position, centre–back position and right–midfield position. After missing one match against Borussia Dortmund on 1 May 2010, Riether returned to the starting line–up in the last game of the season against Eintracht Frankfurt and scored his second goal of the season, in a 3–1 win. At the end of the 2009–10 season, he went on to make a total of forty–two appearances and scoring two times in all competitions.

At the start of the 2010–11 season, Riether was featured for the first three matches before being sidelined with an injury that he sustained at training. After missing one match, Riether returned to the starting line–up against Hannover 96 on 18 September 2010, only to suffer a thigh injury that saw him being substituted in the 39th minute, as Wolfsburg won 2–0. After the match, he was sidelined for the rest of September. But Riether made his return from injury against Borussia Mönchengladbach on 2 October 2010 and helped the club draw 1–1. However, he was sidelined once again after suffering a knee injury that saw him miss one match. But Riether returned to the starting line–up against St. Pauli on 21 November 2010 and helped Wolfsburg draw 1–1, On 15 January 2011, he scored his first goal of the season, in a 1–1 draw against Bayern Munich. However, in a match against Borussia Dortmund on 29 January 2011, Riether suffered a knee injury and was substituted in the 21st minute, as the club lost 3–0. After the match, it was announced that the player was sidelined for three weeks. But he made his return to the starting line–up against his former club, SC Freiburg on 19 February 2011, as Wolfsburg lost 2–1. Despite suffering injuries during the 2010–11 season, Riether continued to remain in the first team regular, rotating in playing either right–back position, centre–back position, right–midfield position, defensive midfield position and centre–midfield position. He then scored his second goal of the season, in a 1–0 win against Werder Bremen on 28 April 2011. At the end of the 2010–11 season, Riether went on to make thirty–one appearances and scoring two times in all competitions.

In the summer transfer window of 2011, Riether was linked a move away from Wolfsburg, putting his future in doubt. It came after when he rejected a new contract from the club despite having a one–year contract left. One club interested was 1. FC Köln and eventually, the agreement was reached on 3 July 2011. During his time at Wolfsburg, Riether was the club's fan favourite.

=== 1. FC Köln ===
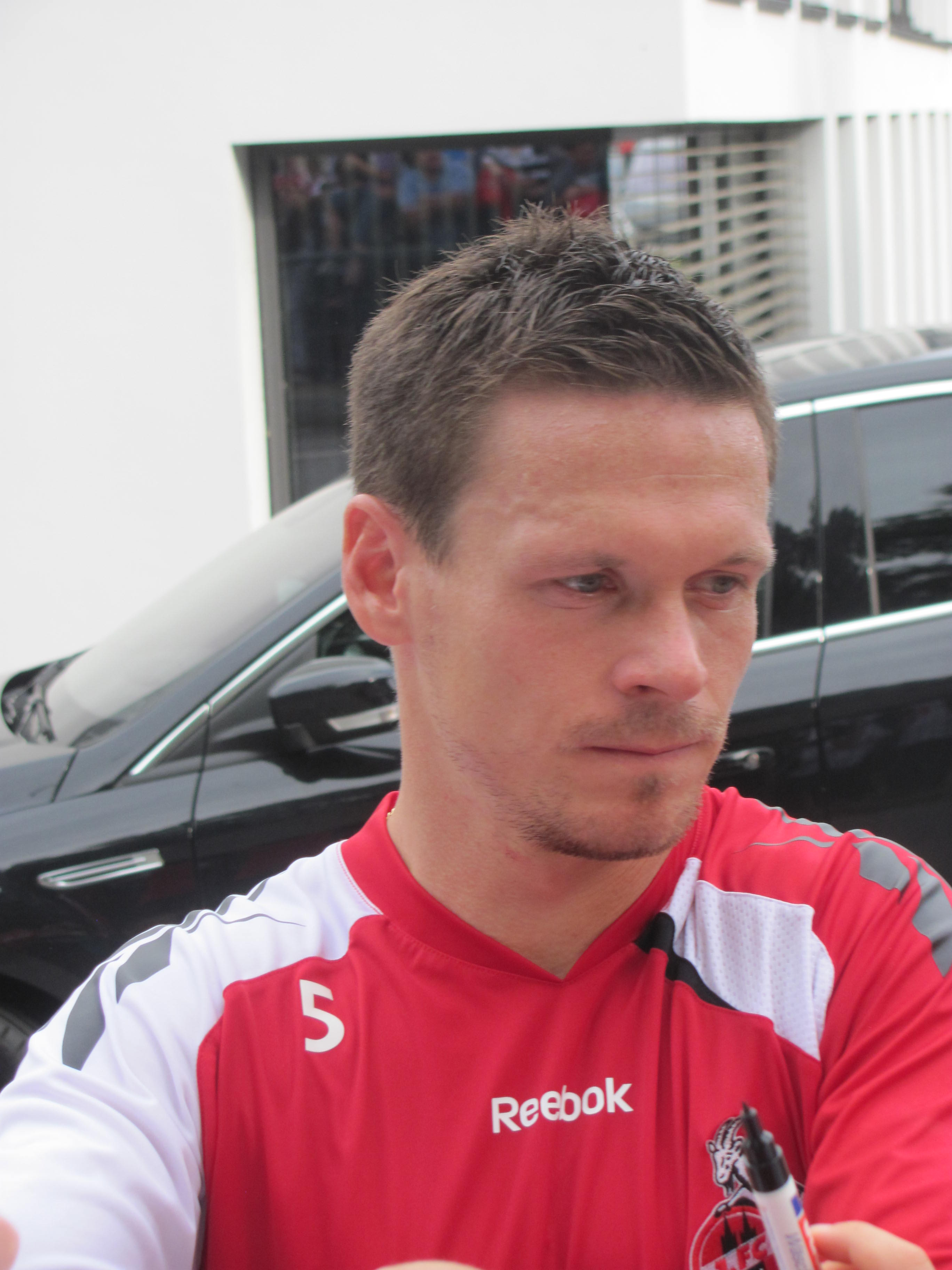
Riether training at during his time at 1. FC Köln in 2011.

It was confirmed on 8 July 2011 that Riether was transferred to Bundesliga rivals 1. FC Köln for €2.8 million.

Ahead of the 2011–12 season, Manager Ståle Solbakken wanted Riether to be captain, but he declined the offer, leading Pedro Geromel to be appointed instead. Nevertheless, Riether was given a vice–captain role instead. He made his debut for the club, starting the whole game in the defensive midfield position, in a 3–0 against his former club, Wolfsburg in the opening game of the season. Since making his debut for 1. FC Köln, Riether quickly established himself in the midfield position, where he usually next to Martin Lanig and Adam Matuszczyk. In the absence of captain Geromel, Riether captained the side for the first time on 25 September 2011, in a 2–0 win over 1899 Hoffenheim. He went on captain for the next five matches before Geromel return. On 25 February 2012, Riether captained the side once again, in a 2–0 loss against Bayer Leverkusen. A month later on 25 March 2012 against Borussia Dortmund, he made his 200th Bundesliga appearances, as they went on to lose 6–1. However, towards the end of the season, the club was eventually relegated to the 2. Bundesliga. Despite suffering setback during the 2011–12 season, Riether finished his first season, making 35 appearances (33 out of which were league fixtures) in all competitions.

At the end of the 2011–12 season, Riether's future at 1. FC Köln became increasingly uncertain after he was advised to find a new club. As a result, Riether was linked a move away from 1. FC Köln, with clubs from abroad and his native clubs, both VfB Stuttgart and SC Freiburg, were among interested.

=== Fulham ===
On 6 July 2012, Riether moved to Premier League side Fulham on a season-long loan deal from parent club 1. FC Köln, after they were relegated to the 2. Bundesliga, reuniting with his former Wolfsburg teammate Ashkan Dejagah. The move also had an option to acquire the player at the end of the loan period. After securing the move to his new club, Riether spoke of his delight for being able to suit up at Craven Cottage, "I remember Craven Cottage being a great stadium with great fans, and I hope I can go on to have a great season here."

Riether made his Fulham debut on the first day of the season against Norwich City, a 5–0 thumping of the Canaries at Craven Cottage. Since making his debut, he quickly established himself in the starting eleven for the side, beating out Stephen Kelly over the right–back position. On 10 November, Riether was adjudged to have handled the ball inside the area and referee Phil Dowd awarded a 93rd-minute penalty to Arsenal with the game tied 3–3; Mikel Arteta's spot-kick was saved by Mark Schwarzer and Fulham escaped the Emirates with a point. Riether scored his first goal in the Premier League for Fulham in a 2–2 draw at Sunderland on 2 March 2013. Despite missing out three matches during the 2012–13 season, he went on to make 39 appearances and scoring once in all competitions. Following a successful debut season in England, Riether was voted as the club's Player of the Season by his fellow players, beating out the likes of top scorer Dimitar Berbatov and Greek midfielder Giorgos Karagounis.

On 16 May 2013, Riether agreed a permanent deal with Fulham for an undisclosed fee. He said "I am pleased after a first season in England and am focused on my other tasks in Fulham." Ahead of the 2013–14 season, he signed a contract extension with the club, keeping him until 2016. Riether continued to regain his first team place, in the right–back position despite facing competition from new signing, Elsad Zverotić. On 5 October 2013, Riether twice cleared shots off the line from fellow countryman Robert Huth as Fulham beat Stoke City 1–0 at home. Riether received much praise for his play and was recognized by Sky Sports as the game's "Man of the Match" for his endeavors. On 4 November 2013, Riether was charged with violent conduct by The FA after video evidence showed that he stamped on Manchester United player Adnan Januzaj in stoppage time of Fulham's 3–1 loss to United two days before. The club later found themselves in the relegation zone following the club's string of losses, which he described it as "desperate to avoid another survival scrap after experience with Cologne". Even after the reuniting with Manager Magath, the club were later relegated to the Championship after losing 4–1 to Stoke City. Riether's form had dropped, as Metro reflected on his performance: "Riether's demise, however, was so stark and speedy it was almost upsetting. He was slow and turgid last season and began to resemble a player more fitting to his age." Despite this, Riether finished the 2013–14 season, making 33 appearances and scoring once in all competitions.

Initially remaining coy about his future at Fulham until the end of the season, Riether was among several players expected to leave Fulham following their relegation. During his time at Fulham, Riether was the subject of a football chant from Fulham supporters in his honour by singing: "Sascha Riether Baby – Sascha Riether ohohohoho!"

=== Return to Freiburg ===
On 26 June 2014, Riether left relegated Fulham and rejoined his first club SC Freiburg for an undisclosed fee.

However, at the start of the season, Riether suffered a knee injury that saw him miss the first four matches. But he made his second debut for the club, coming on as a second–half substitute, in a 3–3 draw against TSG Hoffeinheim on 23 September 2014. Expected to feature in the midfield position, Riether played in the right–back position, where he found himself in the competition with Oliver Sorg instead. In the absence of captain of Miso Brecko and Julian Schuster, who lost his first team place, Riether captained the side on four occasions throughout the first half of the season. However, he suffered a muscle injury in late–November and missed the next three matches as a result. But Riether returned from injury against Hamburger SV on 13 December 2014 and started the whole game as captain, helping SC Freiburg keep a clean sheet, in a 0–0 draw. Following his returning from injury, he regained his first team place, playing in the right–back position. Riether helped the club keep three consecutive clean sheets between 21 March 2015 and 11 April 2015. However, towards the end of the 2014–15 season, he lost his first team place and was demoted to the substitute bench, as the club were relegated from the Bundesliga. At the end of the 2014–15 season, Riether went on to make twenty–one appearances in all competitions.

=== Schalke 04 ===
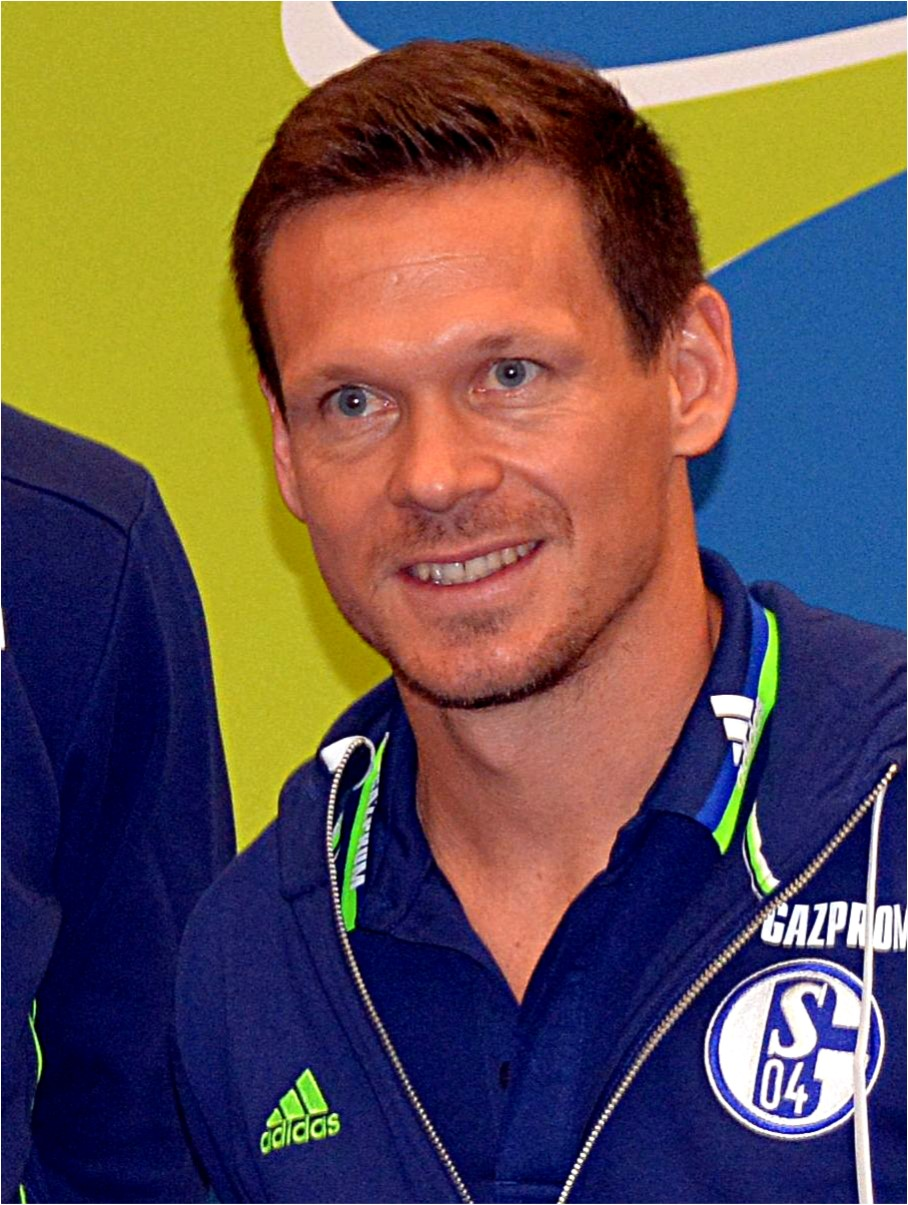
Riether pictured during his time at Schalke 04 in 2016.

Following Freiburg's relegation from the Bundesliga, Riether signed for Schalke 04 on 23 July 2015, signing a one–year contract and an option of extending for another season. Upon joining the club, he was given a number 27 shirt ahead of the new season.

Riether made his Schalke 04 debut, where he started the whole game, in a 3–1 win over Werder Bremen in the opening game of the season. Since making his Schalke 04 debut, Riether appeared in and out of the first team, due to facing strong competition with Júnior Caiçara over the right–back position. As a result, he often rotate with Caiçara over the right–back position throughout the 2015–16 season. Despite this, Riether played a role in the UEFA Europa League in two separate matches, which he assisted two times, both a win against Asteras Tripolis and APOEL; and ultimately helped the club reach the knockout stage. Later in the 2015–16 season, Riether later played in the centre–back position on two occasions, coming against Borussia Dortmund and Bayern Munich. At the end of the 2015–16 season, he went on to make twenty appearances (16 of which were in the starting eleven) in all competitions. Following this, the club opted to take up their option of a contract extension that would ensure Riether remained under contract for the 2016–17 season.

However, at the start of the 2016–17 season, Riether continued to find himself in competition over the right-back position, with Caiçara and new signing, Coke. He made his first appearance of the season, coming on as a 77th-minute substitute, in a 4–1 win against FC 08 Villingen in the first round of the DFB–Pokal. Riether then started twice for Schalke 04, playing in the right–back position against 1. FC Köln and Hoffenheim. After the club qualified for the UEFA Europa League, he started two matches in the UEFA Europa League against Nice and Red Bull Salzburg. Throughout most of the 2016–17 season, Riether struggled to regain his first team place, due to Benedikt Höwedes being preferred instead as a right–back and was placed on the substitute bench. By late–April, he appeared four matches, including two starts against Ajax in the UEFA Europa League and FC Ingolstadt. At the end of the 2016–17 season, making 9 appearances in all competitions, Riether was released by the club.

==== Return to Schalke 04 and retirement ====
After four months since being a free agent, Riether trained with Schalke 04 with Manager Domenico Tedesco. Several weeks after training with them, it was announced on 6 October 2017 that the player signed a contract with the club for the remainder of the 2017–18 season. However, he struggled to receive playing time throughout the 2017–18 season and made no appearances for Schalke 04. Following this, Riether extended his contract to one more year to stay at Schalke 04.

However throughout the 2018–19 season, Riether continued struggled to receive playing time throughout the season, due to competitions and his own injury concern. But the only game he played for Schalke 04 in the 2018–19 season was in the last game of the season in which Schalke 04 tied 0–0 against VfB Stuttgart. After that Riether retired from professional football.

== Post-playing career ==
Riether said on an interview on three separate occasions that he would be interested in coaching once his playing career comes to an end. Following his retirement from professional football, Riether was appointed as Schalke 04's first coordinator for the licensed players department. He spoke about his role and was assigned to analyse the players' performances. In November 2020, the club deny reports on their website that Riether was appointed as their new sports director. Three months later, however, Schalke 04 announced that he was relieved of duties following the club's poor results in the league.

== International career ==
=== Youth career ===
Riether previously represented Germany youth teams early in his career.

Later in 2002, Riether was called up by Germany U-20 and made his debut for the side on 23 October 2002. He went on to make two appearances for the U20 side.

In August 2003, Riether was called up by Germany U-21 for the first time. On 9 September 2003, he made his debut for the U21 side, in a 1–0 loss against Scotland U21. Riether captained the U21 side on five occasions. In the UEFA European Under-21 Championship, Riether made one appearances during the tournament and were eliminated in the Group Stage. Riether went on to make thirteen appearances for the U21 side.

=== Senior career ===
Due to his good performance at Wolfsburg, Riether was considered to be called up by the national team. However, in May 2010, he was cut from being short–listed for the FIFA World Cup squad for the side. Three months later, he was finally called up by the senior team.

Riether made his debut with the Germany national team on 11 August 2010, in a friendly against Denmark and played 34 minutes coming on as substitute for Andreas Beck, as the match finished in a 2–2 draw. After the match, he said about his debut, quoting: "It was very special for me, the first international match, but unfortunately we did not win, but I'm really happy to get a taste of it."

To date, Riether's only other appearance with the national side was on 7 September 2010, playing the full 90 minutes of a 6–1 thumping of Azerbaijan in a UEFA Euro 2012 qualifying match. Since then, he has been called up by the national team on two occasions. Two years after moving to Fulham, Riether hopes his move would have benefited his international career, which never happened. So his two full caps came in a period of less than a month in 2010.

== Personal life ==
Born in Lahr, West Germany, Riether grew up in Kühbach and excelled in wrestling. However, he had no interest in freestyle or Greco-Roman, leading him to change his interests to football. His interest in endurance racing earned him the nickname "Herbie". Growing up, he supported Borussia Dortmund and idolised Matthias Sammer.

In his early football career, Riether developed a reputation as "a good schoolboy, who always does his work without corners and edges, never attracts attention and therefore sometimes receives too little attention." He left school "at least 2-Abi" in 2002. In addition to speaking German, Riether speaks Spanish, French, English and some Portuguese. During his time at Wolfsburg, Riether developed a friendship with his then teammates, Gentner and Marcel Schäfer.

Riether is married to his wife Susana, a law student. In June 2020, he became a first time father when his wife gave birth to a baby girl, Sarah.

== Career statistics ==
=== Club ===
Appearances and goals by club, season and competition
Club	Season	League			National cup		League cup		Continental (Note: Includes UEFA Champions League and UEFA Cup/Europa League)		Total		Ref.
Club	Season	Division	Apps	Goals	Apps	Goals	Apps	Goals	Apps	Goals	Apps	Goals	Ref.
SC Freiburg	2002–03	2. Bundesliga	23	0	3	0	—		—		26	0	
SC Freiburg	2003–04	Bundesliga	33	3	3	0	—		—		36	3	
SC Freiburg	2004–05	Bundesliga	25	1	2	1	—		—		27	2	
SC Freiburg	2005–06	2. Bundesliga	29	0	2	0	—		—		31	0	
SC Freiburg	2006–07	2. Bundesliga	29	0	2	0	—		—		31	0	
SC Freiburg	Total		139	4	12	1	—		—		151	5	—
VfL Wolfsburg	2007–08	Bundesliga	27	1	5	0	—		—		32	1	
VfL Wolfsburg	2008–09	Bundesliga	28	2	3	0	—		6	0	37	2	
VfL Wolfsburg	2009–10	Bundesliga	33	1	2	1	—		12	0	47	2	
VfL Wolfsburg	2010–11	Bundesliga	28	2	3	0	—		—		31	2	
VfL Wolfsburg	Total		116	6	13	1	—		18	0	147	7	—
1. FC Köln	2011–12	Bundesliga	33	0	2	0	—		—		35	0	
Fulham	2012–13	Premier League	35	1	3	0	1	0	—		39	1	
Fulham	2013–14	Premier League	31	0	1	0	1	0	—		33	0	
Fulham	Total		66	1	4	0	2	0	—		72	1	—
SC Freiburg	2014–15	Bundesliga	19	0	2	0	—		—		21	0	
Schalke 04	2015–16	Bundesliga	17	0	1	0	—		2	0	20	0	
Schalke 04	2016–17	Bundesliga	5	0	1	0	—		3	0	9	0	
Schalke 04	2017–18	Bundesliga	0	0	0	0	—		0	0	0	0	
Schalke 04	2018–19	Bundesliga	1	0	0	0	—		0	0	1	0	
Schalke 04	Total		23	0	2	0	—		5	0	30	0	—
Career total			396	11	35	2	2	0	23	0	456	13	—

=== International ===
Appearances and goals by national team and year
National team	Year	Apps	Goals
Germany	2010	2	0

== Honours ==
=== Player ===
SC Freiburg

- 2. Bundesliga: 2002–03

VfL Wolfsburg

- Bundesliga: 2008–09

Individual

- Fulham Players' Player of the Year: 2012–13
