= 2011–12 1. FC Köln season =

1. FC Köln
2011–12 season
- Manager: Ståle Solbakken
- Stadium: RheinEnergieStadion
- Bundesliga: 17th (relegated)
- DFB-Pokal: 2nd Round
- Top goalscorer: League: Lukas Podolski (14); All: Lukas Podolski (14)
- Highest home attendance: 50,000 vs. Borussia Mönchengladbach
- Lowest home attendance: 43,200 vs. 1. FC Nürnberg
Home colours	Away colours	Third colours

The 2011–12 1. FC Köln season began on 31 July 2011 against Wiedenbrück 2000 in a DFB-Pokal 1st round match. They club played its home matches at the RheinEnergieStadion.

For the season, the club hired Ståle Solbakken as its new head coach. The board of directors announced their resignation at the annual general meeting. Speculation concerning Lukas Podolski's future at 1. FC Köln has been written about a lot during the season. 1. FC Köln were eliminated from the DFB-Pokal in the 2nd Round. The club was in tenth place halfway through the season. The club went to Portimão, Portugal, during the winter break. Unfortunately, the team had an alarming slump in form in the second half of the season, coinciding with news that their star player Lukas Podolski had signed for Arsenal on 30 April and would join the team on 1 July. They were officially relegated from the Bundesliga after their 4–1 home loss to second-placed Bayern Munich on 5 May on the final day of the 2011–12 Bundesliga season.

== Review and events ==
=== Off-season ===
Prior to the last match of last season, 1. FC Köln hired Ståle Solbakken as their new head coach. He previously coached Copenhagen. Also on the last matchday of last season, Petit tore his anterior cruciate ligament in a match against Schalke 04 and has yet to debut this season.

=== Pre-season ===
Arsenal defeated 1. FC Köln 2–1. On 25 July, Solbakken named Pedro Geromel captain. Lukas Podolski was Geromel's predecessor.

=== Season ===
On 31 July, 1. FC Köln opened up their season with a 3–0 DFB-Pokal win against Wiedenbrück 2000.

1. FC Köln were eliminated from the DFB-Pokal in the 2nd Round.

On 13 November, Wolfgang Overath along with deputies Friedrich Neukirch and Jürgen Glowacz resigned from the board of directors. Overath stated how there was a "strain in recent months" for all of them and "frustration, inner conflict, and wear and tear". Overath also stated how the board was "not always a team" and how he "was reviled and insulted in a way, as I have never experienced before.".

On 19 November, the match against Mainz 05 was canceled after the referee for the match, Babak Rafati, attempted suicide. The match was eventually rescheduled for 13 December.

1. FC Köln stated that they would allow Sebastian Freis and Kevin Pezzoni to leave on free transfers.

For the winter break, 1. FC Köln returned to practice on 2 January 2012 at 11:00 CET (UTC+01) and had a training camp in Portimão, Portugal, from 5 to 12 January.

On 4 March 2012, a group 1. FC Köln supporters attacked a bus with Borussia Mönchengladbach supporters in it.

On 10 March 2012, 1. FC Köln announced, that in mutual agreement, Volker Finke will be released from his position as Sporting Director.

On 12 April 2012, 1. FC Köln dismissed Ståle Solbakken as head coach of the club and replaced him with Frank Schaefer. The club was in 16th place at the time of the firing. The club originally announced that he was "on leave". However, Solbakken confirmed that he was fired.

1. FC Köln finished in 17th place and were relegated on the final day of the season. Hertha BSC would have been automatically been relegated if they had lost or drew against 1899 Hoffenheim.

=== Lukas Podolski ===
Lukas Podolski's future at 1. FC Köln has been speculated much during the first half of the season by the media. Turkish media announced how Podolski and Galatasaray S.K. had already agreed. These rumours were proved false when Podolski was still at 1. FC Köln when the transfer deadline passed. In August, Sports Director Volker Finke stated how the club absolutely must keep Podolski at all cost.

Arsenal, Lokomotiv Moscow, Galatasaray S.K., Lazio and Schalke 04 are all known to be interested in Podolski and have been tracking him during the first half of season. However, it would be difficult for Schalke 04 to sign Podolski. Podolski stated that "a change in the Bundesliga is for me very difficult to imagine". Arsène Wenger has denied that he wants to purchase Podolski during the winter transfer period. Die Welt has reported that Wenger has no interest in Podolski at all.

Finke stated on 11 December that, "Podolski would not be part of the squad for 2012–13, if he did not sign an extension," while Podolski responded by stating, "he would be willing to play for the amateurs or sit in the stands while his current deal expired". 1. FC Köln is about €25 million in debt and Finke doesn't believe that 1. FC Köln can afford a free transfer. Deutsche Welle stated that the "more logical decision" would be to sell Podolski during the winter transfer period because he is not cup-tied to any club in UEFA's European competitions and how their position to sell would be weaken if they wait for next summer.

Jürgen Klopp came out and criticized Podolski. Klopp stated how Podolski only plays well every other week and is too expensive because of this. Podolski stated how he turned down Klopp twice and how Borussia Dortmund could not afford him because it does have any more UEFA Champions League revenue for the season.

Arsenal F.C. defender Per Mertesacker stated how Podolski, along with former Arsenal striker Thierry Henry, would be "perfect acquisitions". On 7 March, Mertesacker stated that Podolski has asked about "a potential move to the Emirates". Oliver Bierhoff stated that Podolski would be making a "great move" if he left 1. FC Köln for Arsenal F.C.

There were reports that claimed 1. FC Köln sold Podolski to Arsenal F.C. for €13 million with Bayern Munich getting 10% of the amount over €10 million. However, Podolski himself denied that any deal has been finalized with Arsenal F.C. Reports doubted that the move will even happen after Podolski claimed that he could be tempted by Lazio.

Podolski finally decided to sign for Arsenal on 30 April.

== Matches ==
=== Legend ===
Win Draw Loss Postponed

=== Bundesliga ===
6 August 2011 1	1. FC Köln	0–3	VfL Wolfsburg	Cologne
15:30 CEST (UTC+02)	Novaković (yellow card) 14' (yellow-red card) 79'	Match Report	Hasebe (yellow card) 13'; Helmes 17', 90+3'; Ochs (yellow card) 18'; Russ (yellow card) 79'; Schäfer (yellow card) 83', (goal) 85'; Mandžukić (yellow card) 90+4'	Stadium: RheinEnergieStadion; Attendance: 47,000; Referee: Manuel Gräfe; Man of the Match: Mario Mandžukić

13 August 2011 2	Schalke 04	5–1	1. FC Köln	Gelsenkirchen
15:30 CEST (UTC+02)	Huntelaar 42' (pen.), 47', 85'; Holtby 48'; Raúl 59'	Match Report	Podolski 12'; Lanig (yellow card) 19'; McKenna (yellow card) 42'; Roshi (yellow card) 80'	Stadium: Veltins-Arena; Attendance: 61,673; Referee: Guido Winkmann; Man of the Match: Huntelaar

20 August 2011 3	1. FC Köln	1–1	1. FC Kaiserslautern	Cologne
18:30 CEST (UTC+02)	Jajalo 19'; Lanig (yellow card) 34'; Brečko (yellow card) 53'; Andrezinho (yellow card) 87'	Match Report	Amedick (yellow card) 2'; Iličević 17'; Kirch (yellow card) 25'; Dick (yellow card) 79'; Jessen (yellow card) 81'	Stadium: RheinEnergieStadion; Attendance: 47,200; Referee: Knut Kircher; Man of the Match: Kevin Trapp

27 August 2011 4	Hamburger SV	3–4	1. FC Köln	Hamburg
15:30 CEST (UTC+02)	Petrić 11' (pen.); Rajković 59'; Son 62'; Aogo (yellow card) 66'	Match Report	Chihi 21'; Brečko (yellow card) 24'; Novaković 49', (yellow card) 66'; Clemens 84'; McKenna 88'; Riether (yellow card) 88'	Stadium: Imtech Arena; Attendance: 51,289; Referee: Florian Meyer; Man of the Match: Adil Chihi

11 September 2011 5	1. FC Köln	1–2	1. FC Nürnberg	Cologne
15:30 CEST (UTC+02)	Chihi 39', (yellow card) 67'; Riether (yellow card) 56'; Brečko (red card) 75'; McKenna (yellow card) 90'	Match Report	Pekhart (yellow card) 19' (yellow-red card) 42'; Simons 31' (pen.), 35' (pen.); Feulner (yellow card) 57'	Stadium: RheinEnergieStadion; Attendance: 43,200; Referee: Michael Weiner; Man of the Match: Simons

17 September 2011 6	Bayer Leverkusen	1–4	1. FC Köln	Leverkusen
15:30 CEST (UTC+02)	Balitsch (yellow card) 27'; Rolfes 70'; Schürrle (red card) 90+1'	Match Report	Peszko (yellow card) 27'; Novaković 44'; Podolski 47', 54'; Clemens (yellow card) 79'; Rensing (yellow card) 82'; Riether (yellow card) 84'; Jajalo 90'	Stadium: BayArena; Attendance: 30,210; Referee: Günter Perl; Man of the Match: Lukas Podolski

25 September 2011 7	1. FC Köln	2–0	1899 Hoffenheim	Cologne
15:30 CEST (UTC+02)	Sereno (yellow card) 18'; Jajalo 20'; Podolski 64'	Match Report	Babel (yellow card) 14'; Compper (yellow card) 75'	Stadium: RheinEnergieStadion; Attendance: 45,500; Referee: Peter Sippel; Man of the Match: Lukas Podolski

1 October 8	Hertha BSC	3–0	1. FC Köln	Berlin
18:30 CEST (UTC+02)	Lasogga 14', 26', (yellow card) 77'; Raffael 34'; Franz (yellow card) 81'	Match Report	Peszko (yellow card) 61'; Lanig (yellow card) 71'	Stadium: Olympiastadion; Attendance: 59,491; Referee: Florian Meyer; Man of the Match: Änis Ben-Hatira

16 October 2011 9	1. FC Köln	2–0	Hannover 96	Cologne
17:30 CEST (UTC+02)	Podolski 24', 86', (yellow card) 65'; Chihi (yellow card) 80'; Lanig (yellow card) 84'	Match Report	Rausch (yellow card) 33'; Schmiedebach (yellow card) 57'; Pogatetz (yellow card) 62'; Pinto (yellow card) 77'	Stadium: RheinEnergieStadion; Attendance: 46,000; Referee: Jochen Drees; Man of the Match: Lukas Podolski

22 October 2011 10	Borussia Dortmund	5–0	1. FC Köln	Dortmund
15:30 CEST (UTC+02)	Kehl (yellow card) 5', (goal) 66'; Kagawa 7'; Schmelzer 25'; Subotić (yellow card) 38'; Lewandowski 44', 50'	Match Report	Matuszczyk (yellow card) 6'; Sereno (yellow card) 47'	Stadium: Signal Iduna Park; Attendance: 80,200; Referee: Felix Brych; Man of the Match: Mats Hummels

30 October 2011 11	1. FC Köln	3–0	FC Augsburg	Cologne
15:30 CET (UTC+01)	Podolski 19', 24' (pen.); Jajalo (yellow card) 45+2'; Peszko 56'	Match Report	Callsen-Bracker (yellow card) 40'; Bellinghausen (yellow card) 48'; Oehrl (red card) 75'	Stadium: RheinEnergieStadion; Attendance: 48,000; Referee: Peter Gagelmann; Man of the Match: Lukas Podolski

5 November 2011 12	Werder Bremen	3–2	1. FC Köln	Bremen
15:30 CET (UTC+01)	Papastathopoulos (yellow card) 20'; Fritz (yellow card) 45'; Bargfrede (yellow card) 47'; Pizzaro 49', 54' (pen.), 86'	Match Report	Clemens 3'; Riether (yellow card) 42'; Podolski 45'; Sereno (red card) 53'; Rensing (yellow card) 78'; Lanig (yellow card) 89'	Stadium: Weserstadion; Attendance: 41,500; Referee: Michael Weiner; Man of the Match: Claudio Pizzaro

19 November 2011 13	1. FC Köln	Postponed	Mainz 05	Cologne
15:30 CET (UTC+01)				Stadium: RheinEnergieStadion; Referee: Babak Rafati

25 November 2011 14	1. FC Köln	0–3	Borussia Mönchengladbach	Cologne
20:30 CET (UTC+01)	Peszko (yellow card) 43'	Match Report	Hanke 20', 47'; Arango 30'; Herrmann (yellow card) 68'	Stadium: RheinEnergieStadion; Attendance: 50,000; Referee: Manuel Gräfe; Man of the Match: Mike Hanke

3 December 2011 15	VfB Stuttgart	2–2	1. FC Köln	Stuttgart
18:30 CET (UTC+01)	Gentner 29', 36'; Boulahrouz (yellow card) 45+1'; Okazaki (yellow card) 66'; Boka (yellow card) 83'	Match Report	Podolski 15' (pen.), 88'; Lanig (yellow card) 20'; Brečko (yellow card) 48'; Jemal (yellow card) 79'; Sereno (yellow card) 90'	Stadium: Mercedes-Benz Arena; Attendance: 56,255; Referee: Felix Brych; Man of the Match: Christian Gentner

10 December 2011 16	1. FC Köln	4–0	SC Freiburg	Cologne
15:30 CET (UTC+01)	Clemens 19', 66'; Sereno (yellow card) 39'; Podolski 60', 73'	Match Report	Bastians (yellow card) 38'; Schuster (yellow card) 54'	Stadium: RheinEnergieStadion; Attendance: 44,500; Referee: Marco Fritz; Man of the Match: Lukas Podolski

13 December 2011 13	1. FC Köln	1–1	Mainz 05	Cologne
20:30 CET (UTC+01)	Jemal (yellow card) 29'; Podolski 85'; Brečko (yellow card) 88'	Match Report	Gavranović (yellow card) 16'; Svensson (yellow card) 24'; Allagui (yellow card) 48', (goal) 70'; Baumgartlinger (yellow card) 62'	Stadium: RheinEnergieStadion; Attendance: 44,800; Referee: Felix Zwayer

16 December 2011 17	Bayern Munich	3–0	1. FC Köln	Munich
20:30 CET (UTC+01)	Ribéry (yellow card) 33' (yellow-red card) 33'; Gómez 48'; Alaba 63'; Kroos 88'	Match Report	Sereno (yellow card) 33'; Jajalo (yellow card) 65'; Peszko (yellow card) 66'; McKenna (yellow card) 85'	Stadium: Allianz Arena; Attendance: 69,000; Referee: Guido Winkmann; Man of the Match: Toni Kroos

21 January 2012 18	VfL Wolfsburg	1–0	1. FC Köln	Wolfsburg
15:30 CET (UTC+01)	Lopes (yellow card) 21'; Polter 78'		Jajalo (yellow card) 65'; Eichner (yellow card) 81'	Stadium: Volkswagen Arena; Attendance: 27,057; Referee: Tobias Welz; Man of the Match: Ashkan Dejagah

28 January 2012 19	1. FC Köln	1–4	Schalke 04	Cologne
18:30 CET (UTC+01)	Podolski 4'; Pedro Geromel (yellow card) 18'; Brečko (red card) 78'		Uchida (yellow card) 35'; Matip (yellow card) 53'; Marica 60', 73'; Huntelaar 78'; Höger 82'	Stadium: RheinEnergieStadion; Attendance: 50,000; Referee: Jochen Drees; Man of the Match: Ciprian Marica

5 February 2012 20	1. FC Kaiserslautern	0–1	1. FC Köln	Kaiserslautern
17:30 CET (UTC+01)	Borysiuk (yellow card) 35' (yellow-red card) 40'; Rodnei (yellow card) 40'; Şahan (yellow card) 78'		Roshi 72'	Stadium: Fritz-Walter-Stadion; Attendance: 38,043; Referee: Wolfgang Stark; Man of the Match: Michael Rensing

12 February 2012 21	1. FC Köln	0–1	Hamburger SV	Cologne
17:30 CET (UTC+01)	Lanig (yellow card) 43'; Jemal (yellow card) 48'; Pedro Geromel (yellow card) 64'		Sala (yellow card) 60'; Guerrero 88'	Stadium: RheinEnergieStadion; Attendance: 46,500; Referee: Florian Meyer; Man of the Match: Paolo Guerrero

18 February 2012 22	1. FC Nürnberg	2–1	1. FC Köln	Nuremberg
15:30 CET (UTC+01)	Esswein 28'; Hloušek (yellow card) 57'; Schäfer (yellow card) 67'; Simons (yellow card) 78'; Pekhart 85'		Peszko (yellow card) 24'; Brečko (yellow card) 55'; Novaković 66'; Roshi (yellow card) 77'	Stadium: Frankenstadion; Attendance: 38,101; Referee: Christian Dingert; Man of the Match: Alexander Esswein

25 February 2012 23	1. FC Köln	0–2	Bayer Leverkusen	Cologne
15:30 CET (UTC+01)	Riether (yellow card) 22'		Bender 16', 50'	Stadium: RheinEnergieStadion; Attendance: 46,500; Referee: Felix Brych; Man of the Match: Lars Bender

4 March 2012 24	1899 Hoffenheim	1–1	1. FC Köln	Sinsheim
17:30 CET (UTC+01)	Compper 33'; Vestergaard (yellow card) 67'; Beck (yellow card) 74'; Weis (yellow card) 79'		Eichner (yellow card) 24'; Lanig (yellow card) 56'; Podolski 81'	Stadium: Rhein-Neckar-Arena; Attendance: 29,250; Referee: Robert Hartmann; Man of the Match: Sebastian Rudy

10 March 2012 25	1. FC Köln	1–0	Hertha BSC	Cologne
15:30 CET (UTC+01)	Peszko (yellow card) 17'; Clemens 36'; Jajalo (red card) 65'; Podolski (red card) 76'; Riether (yellow card) 90+5'		Torun (yellow card) 11'; Lell (yellow card) 74'; Kobiashvili (yellow card) 75' (yellow-red card) 76'; Hubník (yellow card) 84'	Stadium: RheinEnergieStadion; Attendance: 48,000; Referee: Guido Winkmann; Man of the Match: Lukas Podolski

18 March 2012 26	Hannover 96	4–1	1. FC Köln	Hanover
17:30 CET (UTC+01)	Stindl 19'; Schlaudraff 61' (pen.); Diouf 67', 83'	Summary	Pezzoni 43'; Sereno (yellow card) 61'	Stadium: AWD-Arena; Attendance: 45,000; Referee: Wolfgang Stark

25 March 2012 27	1. FC Köln	1–6	Borussia Dortmund	Cologne
17:30 CET (UTC+01)	Novaković 13'; Podolski (yellow card) 51'	Summary	Piszczek 26'; Kagawa 47', 80'; Lewandowski 52'; Gündoğan 79'; Perišić 84'	Stadium: RheinEnergieStadion; Attendance: 50,000; Referee: Felix Zwayer

31 March 2012 28	FC Augsburg	2–1	1. FC Köln	Augsburg
17:30 CET (UTC+01)	Koo 19'; Sankoh (yellow card) 33'; Rafael 45' (pen.)	Summary	Geromel (yellow card) 26'; Lanig (yellow card) 29'; Podolski 42' (pen.); Brečko (yellow card) 54'; Sereno (yellow card) 76'	Stadium: SGL arena Attendance: 30,660; Referee: Tobias Welz

7 April 2012 29	1. FC Köln	1–1	Werder Bremen	Cologne
15:30 CET (UTC+01)	Peszko (yellow card) 27'; Jemal 39'; Riether (yellow card) 58'; Jajalo (yellow card) 75'	Summary	Fritz (yellow card) 22'; Rosenberg 24'; Papastathopoulos (yellow card) 35'	Stadium: RheinEnergieStadion; Attendance: 50,000; Referee: Günter Perl

10 April 2012 30	Mainz 05	4–0	1. FC Köln	Mainz
20:00 CET (UTC+01)	Polanski 19' (pen.); Zidan 31'; N. Müller 37'; Szalai 54', (yellow card) 54'; Choupo-Moting (yellow card) 82'	Summary		Stadium: Coface Arena; Attendance: 34,000; Referee: Felix Brych

15 April 2012 31	Borussia Mönchengladbach	3–0	1. FC Köln	Mönchengladbach
15:30 CET (UTC+01)	Arango 19'; Jantschke 53'; Reus 55'; Dante (yellow card) 82'	Summary	Pedro Geromel (yellow card) 67'; Podolski (yellow card) 79'	Stadium: Borussia-Park; Attendance: 52,990; Referee: Knut Kircher

21 April 2012 32	1. FC Köln	1–1	VfB Stuttgart	Cologne
15:30 CET (UTC+01)	Peszko 50'	Summary	Niedermeier (yellow card) 61'; Harnik (yellow card) 67'; Cacau 71'	Stadium: RheinEnergieStadion; Attendance: 50,000; Referee: Peter Sippel

28 April 2012 33	SC Freiburg	4–1	1. FC Köln	Freiburg
15:30 CET (UTC+01)	Mujdža 36'; Guédé 54'; Caligiuri 84'; Freis 90+1'	Summary	Podolski 47'; McKenna (yellow card) 76'	Stadium: Mage Solar Stadion; Attendance: 24,000; Referee: Wolfgang Stark

5 May 2012 34	1. FC Köln	1–4	Bayern Munich	Cologne
15:30 CET (UTC+01)	Peszko (yellow card) 59'; Novaković 63'	Report	Müller 34', 85'; Pedro Geromel 52' (o.g.); Robben 54'; Schweinsteiger (yellow card) 71'	Stadium: RheinEnergieStadion; Attendance: 50,000; Referee: Florian Meyer

=== DFB-Pokal ===
31 July 2011 1st Round	Wiedenbrück 2000	0–3	1. FC Köln	Gütersloh
		Match Report	Novaković 22', 45'; Jajalo 78'	Stadium: Heidewaldstadion; Attendance: 12,000; Referee: Christian Dingert

25 October 2011 2nd Round	1899 Hoffenheim	2–1	1. FC Köln	Sinsheim
20:30	Obasi 40'; Musona 50'	Match Report	Jajalo 6'	Stadium: Rhein-Neckar Arena; Attendance: 16,000; Referee: Knut Kircher; Man of the Match: Musona

== Squad information ==
=== Roster, appearances, goals and assists ===
As of 30 April 2012

Squad Season 2011-12
Players						Bundesliga			DFB-Pokal			Totals		
No.	Player	Nat.	Birthday	at FCK since	Previous club	MP	G	A	MP	G	A	MP	G	A
Goalkeepers
1	Michael Rensing	German	14 May 1985	2011	Bayern Munich	31	0	0	1	0	0	32	0	0
22	Miro Varvodić	Croatian	15 May 1989	2008	Hajduk Split	2	0	0	1	0	0	3	0	0
24	Daniel Schwabke	German	19 July 1989	2007	1. FC Magdeburg	0	0	0	0	0	0	0	0	0
26	Timo Horn	German	12 May 1993	2002	SC Rondorf	0	0	0	0	0	0	0	0	0
Defenders
2	Mišo Brečko	Slovenian	1 May 1984	2008	Hamburger SV	26	0	2	2	0	0	28	0	2
3	Ammar Jemal	Tunisian	20 April 1987	2011	Young Boys	15	2	0	1	0	0	16	1	0
4	Christian Eichner	German	24 November 1982	2011	1899 Hoffenheim	28	0	1	2	0	0	30	0	1
12	Andrezinho	Brazilian	9 October 1981	2010	Vitória de Guimarães	7	0	0	1	0	0	8	0	0
17	Henrique Sereno	Portuguese	18 May 1985	2011	Porto	25	0	0	1	0	0	26	0	0
18	Tomoaki Makino	Japanese	11 May 1987	2011	Sanfrecce Hiroshima	3	0	0	0	0	0	3	0	0
21	Pedro Geromel (captain)	Brazilian	21 September 1985	2008	Vitória de Guimarães	27	0	0	1	0	1	28	0	1
23	Kevin McKenna	Canadian	21 January 1980	2007	Energie Cottbus	24	1	0	0	0	0	24	1	0
33	Mitchell Weiser	German	21 April 1994	2005	TVE Veltenhof	1	0	0	0	0	0	1	0	0
35	Alexander Vaaßen	German	9 December 1991	1998	Viktoria Thorr	0	0	0	0	0	0	0	0	0
Midfielders
5	Sascha Riether	German	23 March 1983	2011	VfL Wolfsburg	17	0	0	2	0	0	19	0	0
6	Kevin Pezzoni	German	22 March 1989	2008	Blackburn Rovers	11	1	0	2	0	0	13	1	0
8	Petit	Portuguese	25 September 1976	2008	Benfica	0	0	0	0	0	0	0	0	0
13	Martin Lanig	German	11 July 1984	2010	VfB Stuttgart	30	0	1	2	0	0	32	0	1
15	Sławomir Peszko	Poland	19 February 1985	2011	Lech Poznań	31	2	6	2	0	1	33	2	7
19	Mato Jajalo	Croatian	24 May 1988	2010	Siena	30	3	3	2	2	0	32	5	3
20	Adil Chihi	Moroccan	21 February 1988	2004	Fortuna Düsseldorf	10	2	0	1	0	0	11	2	0
25	Adam Matuszczyk	Polish	14 February 1989	2003	VfB Dillingen	9	0	0	1	0	0	10	0	0
28	Odise Roshi	Albanian	22 May 1991	2011	Flamurtari Vlorë	20	1	1	2	0	0	22	1	1
29	Christopher Buchtmann	German	25 April 1992	2010	Fulham F.C.	0	0	0	0	0	0	0	0	0
Forwards
7	Sebastian Freis	German	23 April 1985	2009	Karlsruher SC	4	0	1	1	0	0	5	0	1
10	Lukas Podolski	German	4 June 1985	2009	Bayern Munich	16	14	5	2	0	1	18	14	6
11	Milivoje Novaković	Slovenian	18 May 1979	2006	Litex Lovech	7	2	3	1	2	0	8	4	3
14	Alexandru Ioniță	Romanian	5 August 1989	2010	Rapid București	0	0	0	0	0	0	0	0	0
16	Mikael Ishak	Swedish	31 March 1993	2012	Assyriska FF	11	0	0	0	0	0	11	0	0
27	Christian Clemens	German	4 August 1991	2001	SC Köln Weiler-Volkhoven	15	4	2	2	0	0	17	4	2
31	Mark Uth	German	24 August 1991	2009	Viktoria Köln	0	0	0	0	0	0	0	0	0
38	Thiemo-Jérôme Kialka	German	12 January 1989	2007	VfL 93 Hamburg	0	0	0	0	0	0	0	0	0
MP = Matches played — G = Goals scored — A = Assists
