= 2012–13 Fulham F.C. season =

Fulham
2012–13 season
- Chairman: Mohammed Al Fayed
- Manager: Martin Jol
- Stadium: Craven Cottage
- Premier League: 12th
- FA Cup: Fourth round (lost to Manchester United)
- League Cup: Second round (lost to Sheffield Wednesday)
- Top goalscorer: League: Dimitar Berbatov (15); All: Dimitar Berbatov (15)
- Highest home attendance: 25,700 (26 December vs Southampton, League)
- Lowest home attendance: 14,473 (5 January vs Blackpool, FA Cup)
- Average home league attendance: 24,848 (in all competitions)
Home colours	Away colours	Third colours

The 2012–13 season is Fulham's 115th professional season and their 12th consecutive season in the top flight of English football, the Premier League. They will also compete in the League Cup and the FA Cup.

== First team squad ==
As of 19 May 2013

No.	Name	Nationality	Position	Date of birth (age)	Year signed	Signed from	Appearance (s)	Goal (s)
Goalkeepers
1	Mark Schwarzer	(Australia)	GK	6 October 1972 (age 53)	2008	Middlesbrough	220	0
13	David Stockdale	(England)	GK	20 September 1985 (age 41)	2008	Darlington	26	0
38	Neil Etheridge	(Philippines)	GK	7 February 1990 (age 36)	2008	Fulham Academy	1	0
Defenders
3	John Arne Riise	(Norway)	LB	24 September 1980 (age 45)	2011	(Italy) Roma	76	0
4	Philippe Senderos	(Switzerland)	CB	14 February 1985 (age 41)	2010	Arsenal	53	1
5	Brede Hangeland	(Norway)	CB	20 June 1981 (age 45)	2008	(Denmark) Copenhagen	245	12
6	Chris Baird	(Northern Ireland)	RB	25 February 1982 (age 44)	2007	Southampton	165	4
17	Matthew Briggs	(England)	LB	9 March 1991 (age 35)	2006	Fulham Academy	28	1
18	Aaron Hughes	(Northern Ireland)	CB	8 November 1979 (age 46)	2007	Aston Villa	233	3
25	Stanislav Manolev	(Bulgaria)	RB	16 December 1985 (age 40)	2013	(Netherlands) PSV	4	0
27	Sascha Riether	(Germany)	RB	23 March 1983 (age 43)	2012	(Germany) 1. FC Köln	39	1
Midfielders
7	Steve Sidwell	(England)	CM	14 December 1982 (age 43)	2011	Aston Villa	74	9
8	Pajtim Kasami	(Switzerland)	CM	2 June 1992 (age 34)	2011	(Italy) Palermo	21	0
12	Emmanuel Frimpong	(Ghana)	CM	10 January 1992 (age 34)	2013	Arsenal	6	0
14	Giorgos Karagounis	(Greece)	CM	6 March 1977 (age 49)	2012	Free Agent	28	2
15	Kieran Richardson	(England)	LW	21 October 1984 (age 41)	2012	Sunderland	16	2
16	Damien Duff	(Republic of Ireland)	RW	2 March 1979 (age 47)	2009	Newcastle United	155	22
19	Mahamadou Diarra	(Mali)	DM	18 May 1981 (age 45)	2012	Free Agent	19	1
21	Kerim Frei	(Turkey)	AM	19 November 1993 (age 32)	2011	Fulham Academy	33	1
24	Ashkan Dejagah	(Iran)	AM	5 July 1986 (age 40)	2012	(Germany) VfL Wolfsburg	24	0
28	Urby Emanuelson	(Netherlands)	LW	16 June 1986 (age 40)	2013	(Italy) Milan	13	1
29	Simon Davies	(Wales)	LW	23 October 1979 (age 46)	2007	Everton	168	17
31	Alexander Kačaniklić	(Sweden)	LW	13 August 1991 (age 35)	2010	Liverpool	28	4
33	Eyong Enoh	(Cameroon)	CM	23 March 1986 (age 40)	2013	(Netherlands) Ajax	9	0
Forwards
9	Dimitar Berbatov	(Bulgaria)	ST	30 January 1981 (age 45)	2012	Manchester United	35	15
10	Mladen Petrić	(Croatia)	ST	1 January 1981 (age 45)	2012	(Germany) Hamburger SV	24	5
11	Bryan Ruiz	(Costa Rica)	ST	18 August 1985 (age 41)	2011	(Netherlands) Twente	61	7
20	Hugo Rodallega	(Colombia)	ST	25 July 1985 (age 41)	2012	Wigan Athletic	33	2

Source:BBC Sport

== Transfers ==
=== Transfers in ===
Date	Pos.	Name	From	Fee	Source
28 June 2012	ST	(Croatia) Mladen Petrić	(Germany) Hamburg SV	Free	
12 July 2012	ST	(Colombia) Hugo Rodallega	(England) Wigan Athletic	Free	
31 August 2012	ST	(Bulgaria) Dimitar Berbatov	(England) Manchester United	near £5,000,000	
31 August 2012	MF	(England) Kieran Richardson	(England) Sunderland	£2,000,000	
31 August 2012	MF	(Iran) Ashkan Dejagah	(Germany) VfL Wolfsburg	£2,000,000	
11 September 2012	MF	(Greece) Giorgos Karagounis	Free Agent	Free	

=== Loans in ===
Date	Pos.	Name	From	Length	Source
6 July 2012	DF	(Germany) Sascha Riether	(Germany) 1. FC Köln	Season	
25 January 2013	MF	(Ghana) Emmanuel Frimpong	(England) Arsenal	Season	
31 January 2013	MF	(Netherlands) Urby Emanuelson	(Italy) Milan	Season	
31 January 2013	DF	(Bulgaria) Stanislav Manolev	(Netherlands) PSV	Season	
31 January 2013	MF	(Cameroon) Eyong Enoh	(Netherlands) Ajax	Season	

=== Transfers out ===
Date	Pos.	Name	To	Fee	Source
18 June 2012	ST	(England) Andrew Johnson	(England) Queens Park Rangers	Free	
25 June 2012	MF	(England) Danny Murphy	(England) Blackburn Rovers	Free	
29 June 2012	ST	(Russia) Pavel Pogrebnyak	(England) Reading	Free	
30 June 2012	ST	(Portugal) Orlando Sá	(Cyprus) AEL Limassol	Released	
23 July 2012	MF	(Czech Republic) Marcel Gecov	(Belgium) Gent	Undisclosed	
3 August 2012	MF	(Nigeria) Dickson Etuhu	(England) Blackburn Rovers	£1,500,000	
3 August 2012	MF	(Norway) Bjørn Helge Riise	(Norway) Lillestrøm	Free	
29 August 2012	MF	(Belgium) Mousa Dembélé	(England) Tottenham Hotspur	£15,000,000	
31 August 2012	FW	(United States) Clint Dempsey	(England) Tottenham Hotspur	£6,000,000	
31 August 2012	DF	(Algeria) Rafik Halliche	(Portugal) Académica de Coimbra	Free	
6 December 2012	DF	(Czech Republic) Zdeněk Grygera		Retired	
11 January 2013	DF	(Republic of Ireland) Stephen Kelly	(England) Reading	Undisclosed	

=== Loans out ===
Date	Pos.	Name	To	Length	Source
22 November 2012	GK	(England) David Stockdale	(England) Hull City	2 January 2013	
22 November 2012	ST	(Italy) Marcello Trotta	(England) Brentford	Season	
18 January 2013	GK	(England) David Stockdale	(England) Hull City	Season	

=== Overall transfer activity ===
==== Spending ====
Summer: ▼£8,000,000

Winter: £0

Total: ▼£8,000,000

==== Income ====
Summer: ▲£23,000,000

Winter: £0

Total: ▲£23,000,000

==== Expenditure ====
Summer: ▲£15,000,000

Winter: £0

Total: ▲£15,000,000

== Competitions ==
=== Overall ===
Competition	Started round	Final position / round	First match	Last match
Premier League	—	12th	18 August 2012	19 May 2013
League Cup	2nd round	2nd round	28 August 2012	28 August 2012
FA Cup	3rd round	4th round	5 January 2013	26 January 2013

Updated to match played 19 May 2013
Source: Competitions

=== Premier League table ===
Pos	Team	Pld	W	D	L	GF	GA	GD	Pts
10	West Ham United	38	12	10	16	45	53	−8	46
11	Norwich City	38	10	14	14	41	58	−17	44
12	Fulham	38	11	10	17	50	60	−10	43
13	Stoke City	38	9	15	14	34	45	−11	42
14	Southampton	38	9	14	15	49	60	−11	41

Source: Barclays Premier League
Rules for classification: 1) Points; 2) Goal difference; 3) Goals scored; 4) Play-offs (only if needed to decide champion, teams for relegation or teams for UEFA competitions).

=== Results summary ===
Overall								Home						Away					
Pld	W	D	L	GF	GA	GD	Pts	W	D	L	GF	GA	GD	W	D	L	GF	GA	GD
38	11	10	17	50	60	−10	43	7	3	9	28	30	−2	4	7	8	22	30	−8

=== League performance ===
Round	1	2	3	4	5	6	7	8	9	10	11	12	13	14	15	16	17	18	19	20	21	22	23	24	25	26	27	28	29	30	31	32	33	34	35	36	37	38
Ground	H	A	A	H	A	H	A	H	A	H	A	H	A	A	H	H	A	A	H	H	A	H	A	H	H	A	H	A	A	H	A	A	H	H	A	H	H	A
Result	W	L	L	W	W	L	D	W	D	D	D	L	L	D	L	W	L	L	D	L	W	D	L	W	L	D	W	D	W	W	L	D	L	L	L	L	L	W
Position	1	5	8	8	6	8	9	8	6	7	8	9	9	11	12	13	13	13	14	14	13	13	14	12	13	12	11	10	10	10	10	10	10	11	11	12	15	12

Updated to match(es) played on 19 May. Source: fulhamfc.com
A = Away; H = Home; W = Win; D = Draw; L = Loss

== Fixtures and results ==
=== Pre-season ===
15 July 2012 Friendly	HB Køge	0–0	Fulham	Stadion der Freundschaft
15:00 BST		Report		Attendance: 350; Referee: Lars Albert (Germany)

18 July 2012 Friendly	Lokomotive Leipzig	0–4	Fulham	Bruno-Plache-Stadion
18:00 BST		Report	Trotta 22', 37'; Petrić 69'; Dalla Valle 83'	Attendance: 5,012; Referee: Lars Albert (Germany)

21 July 2012 Friendly	1. FC Kaiserslautern	2–2	Fulham	Arena Weingarten
16:00 BST	Mitsanski 10'; Bugera 15'	Report	Petrić 20', 74'	Attendance: 2,550; Referee: Christian Dingert (Germany)

28 July 2012 Friendly	Wycombe Wanderers	0–3	Fulham	Adams Park
15:00 BST		Report	Petrić 18'; Ruiz 85'; Sidwell 87'	Attendance: 1,711; Referee: Graham Scott

4 August 2012 Friendly	Nice	0–4	Fulham	Stade du Ray
18:00 BST		Report	Petrić 18'; Kačaniklić 45'; Diarra 64'; Mesca 79'	Attendance: 5,162; Referee: Nicolas Rainville (France)

7 August 2012 Friendly	MK Dons	0–1	Fulham	Stadium mk
19:45 BST		Report	Rodallega 81'	Attendance: 4,727; Referee: Pat Miller

11 August 2012 Friendly	Fulham	1–2	Charlton Athletic	Craven Cottage
15:00 BST	Duff 5'	Report	Jackson 70'; Kermorgant 77'	Attendance: – Referee: Andre Marriner

=== Premier League ===
18 August 2012 1	Fulham	5–0	Norwich City	London
15:00 BST	Duff 26'; Petrić 41', 54'; Kačaniklić 66'; Sidwell 87' (pen.)	Report		Stadium: Craven Cottage; Attendance: 25,062; Referee: Michael Oliver

25 August 2012 2	Manchester United	3–2	Fulham	Manchester
15:00 BST	Van Persie 10'; Kagawa 35'; Rafael 41'	Report	Duff 3'; Hangeland (yellow card) 35'; Vidić 64' (o.g.)	Stadium: Old Trafford; Attendance: 75,352; Referee: Kevin Friend

1 September 2012 3	West Ham United	3–0	Fulham	London
12:45 BST	Nolan 1'; Reid 29'; Taylor 41'	Report		Stadium: Boleyn Ground; Attendance: 33,458; Referee: Anthony Taylor

15 September 2012 4	Fulham	3–0	West Bromwich Albion	London
15:00 BST	Berbatov 32', 45+1' (pen.); Sidwell 89'	Report	Odemwingie (red card) 38'	Stadium: Craven Cottage; Attendance: 25,691; Referee: Roger East

22 September 2012 5	Wigan Athletic	1–2	Fulham	Wigan
15:00 BST	Koné 90+1'	Report	Rodallega 31'; Hughes (yellow card) 45'; Duff 68'; Sidwell (yellow card) 70'; Baird (yellow card) 90+4'	Stadium: DW Stadium; Attendance: 19,284; Referee: Lee Probert

29 September 2012 6	Fulham	1–2	Manchester City	London
15:00 BST	Petrić 10' (pen.)	Report	Kompany (yellow card) 36'; Agüero 43'; Džeko 87'	Stadium: Craven Cottage; Attendance: 25,698; Referee: Mark Halsey

7 October 2012 7	Southampton	2–2	Fulham	Southampton
13:30 BST	Fonte 4', 90', (yellow card) 90+1'; Hooiveld (yellow card) 24'; Schneiderlin (yellow card) 48'; Yoshida (yellow card) 65'	Report	Hooiveld 69' (o.g.); Richardson 88'	Stadium: St Mary's Stadium; Attendance: 28,004; Referee: Mark Clattenburg

20 October 2012 8	Fulham	1–0	Aston Villa	London
15:00 BST	Riise (yellow card) 70'; Baird 84'	Report	El Ahmadi (yellow card) 50'; Lichaj (yellow card) 77'	Stadium: Craven Cottage; Attendance: 25,693; Referee: Chris Foy

27 October 2012 9	Reading	3–3	Fulham	Reading
15:00 BST	Leigertwood 26'; Cummings (yellow card) 76'; McCleary 85'; Robson-Kanu 90'	Report	Ruiz 61'; Baird (yellow card) 67', (goal) 77'; Berbatov 88'	Stadium: Madejski Stadium; Attendance: 24,093; Referee: Mike Jones

3 November 2012 10	Fulham	2–2	Everton	London
15:00 GMT	Ruiz 7' ^{[a]} Riise (yellow card) 38'; Diarra (yellow card) 61'; Baird (yellow card) 75'; Sidwell 90'	Report	Fellaini 55', 72'; Osman (yellow card) 85'	Stadium: Craven Cottage; Attendance: 25,699; Referee: Neil Swarbrick

10 November 2012 11	Arsenal	3–3	Fulham	London
15:00 GMT	Giroud 11', 69'; Podolski 23'; Ramsey (yellow card) 60'	Report	Berbatov 29', 67' (pen.); Kačaniklić 40'; Sidwell (yellow card) 41'; Baird (yellow card) 90+5'	Stadium: Emirates Stadium; Attendance: 60,093; Referee: Phil Dowd

18 November 2012 12	Fulham	1–3	Sunderland	London
16:00 GMT	Hangeland (red card) 30'; Sidwell (yellow card) 53'; Petrić 62'	Report	Fletcher 50'; Johnson (yellow card) 59'; Cuéllar 65'; Sessègnon 70'; O'Shea (yellow card) 74'; Cattermole (yellow card) 87'	Stadium: Craven Cottage; Attendance: 25,646; Referee: Lee Probert

24 November 2012 13	Stoke City	1–0	Fulham	Stoke-on-Trent
15:00 GMT	Adam 26'; Cameron (yellow card) 57'	Report	Senderos (yellow card) 19'	Stadium: Britannia Stadium; Attendance: 26,921; Referee: Michael Oliver

28 November 2012 14	Chelsea	0–0	Fulham	London
19:45 GMT	Ivanović (yellow card) 68'; Romeu (yellow card) 70'; David Luiz (yellow card) 73'	Report		Stadium: Stamford Bridge; Attendance: 41,707; Referee: Anthony Taylor

1 December 2012 15	Fulham	0–3	Tottenham Hotspur	London
15:00 GMT		Report	Bale (yellow card) 23'; Sandro 55'; Defoe 72', 77'; Gallas (yellow card) 85'	Stadium: Craven Cottage; Attendance: 25,426; Referee: Chris Foy

10 December 2012 16	Fulham	2–1	Newcastle United	London
20:00 GMT	Sidwell 19'; Rodallega 63'	Report	Ben Arfa 54'	Stadium: Craven Cottage; Attendance: 25,270; Referee: Lee Mason

15 December 2012 17	Queens Park Rangers	2–1	Fulham	London
15:00 GMT	Taarabt 52', 68', (yellow card) 53'	Report	Sidwell (yellow card) 76'; Dejagah (yellow card) 77'; Petrić 88'	Stadium: Loftus Road; Attendance: 18,233; Referee: Martin Atkinson

22 December 2012 18	Liverpool	4–0	Fulham	Liverpool
17:30 GMT	Škrtel 8'; Gerrard 36'; Downing 51'; Johnson (yellow card) 53'; Suárez 90+2'	Report	Dejagah (yellow card) 78'; Karagounis (yellow card) 85'	Stadium: Anfield; Attendance: 44,570; Referee: Mark Clattenburg

26 December 2012 19	Fulham	1–1	Southampton	London
15:00 GMT	Berbatov 8', (yellow card) 9'; Riise (yellow card) 76'; Senderos (yellow card) 84'	Report	Lambert 85' (pen.)	Stadium: Craven Cottage; Attendance: 25,700; Referee: Phil Dowd

29 December 2012 20	Fulham	1–2	Swansea City	London
15:00 GMT	Karagounis (yellow card) 34'; Ruiz 56'; Sidwell (yellow card) 77'	Report	Graham 19'; De Guzmán 52'; Agustien (yellow card) 79'	Stadium: Craven Cottage; Attendance: 25,700; Referee: Andre Marriner

1 January 2013 21	West Bromwich Albion	1–2	Fulham	West Bromwich
12:45 GMT	Lukaku 49'	Report	Berbatov 39'; Kačaniklić 58'	Stadium: The Hawthorns; Attendance: 25,436; Referee: Mike Dean

12 January 2013 22	Fulham	1–1	Wigan Athletic	London
15:00 GMT	Karagounis 22'	Report	McArthur (yellow card) 35'; Di Santo 71'	Stadium: Craven Cottage; Attendance: 25,442; Referee: Mark Clattenburg

19 January 2013 23	Manchester City	2–0	Fulham	Manchester
15:00 GMT	Silva 2', 69'; García (yellow card) 65'	Report	Karagounis (yellow card) 24'; Richardson (yellow card) 56'	Stadium: City of Manchester Stadium; Attendance: 47,286; Referee: Jonathan Moss

30 January 2013 24	Fulham	3–1	West Ham United	London
20:00 GMT	Berbatov 10'; Sidwell (yellow card) 32'; Rodallega 49'; Riether (yellow card) 58'; O'Brien 90+1' (o.g.)	Report	Nolan 48'	Stadium: Craven Cottage; Attendance: 24,791; Referee: Chris Foy

2 February 2013 25	Fulham	0–1	Manchester United	London
17:30 GMT	Baird (yellow card) 65'	Report	Rooney 79', (yellow card) 90+3'	Stadium: Craven Cottage; Attendance: 25,670; Referee: Kevin Friend

9 February 2013 26	Norwich City	0–0	Fulham	Norwich
15:00 GMT	Bennett (yellow card) 37'; Snodgrass (yellow card) 58'	Report	Frimpong (yellow card) 36'; Manolev (yellow card) 87'	Stadium: Carrow Road; Attendance: 26,816; Referee: Howard Webb

23 February 2013 27	Fulham	1–0	Stoke City	London
12:45 GMT	Ruiz (yellow card) 11'; Berbatov 45+2'	Report	Nzonzi (yellow card) 23'; Wilson (yellow card) 35'; Shawcross (yellow card) 75'	Stadium: Craven Cottage; Attendance: 25,458; Referee: Lee Probert

2 March 2013 28	Sunderland	2–2	Fulham	Sunderland
15:00 GMT	Gardner 37' (pen.); Sessègnon 70'; N'Diaye (yellow card) 74'	Report	Berbatov 16' (pen.); Riether 34', (yellow card) 88'; Hangeland (yellow card) 60'; Sidwell (yellow card) 73'	Stadium: Stadium of Light; Attendance: 39,312; Referee: Mark Halsey

17 March 2013 29	Tottenham Hotspur	0–1	Fulham	London
15:00 GMT	Dempsey (yellow card) 77'	Report	Dejagah (yellow card) 16'; Berbatov 52'	Stadium: White Hart Lane; Attendance: 36,004; Referee: Mike Jones

1 April 2013 30	Fulham	3–2	Queens Park Rangers	London
20:00 BST	Berbatov 8' (pen.), 22'; Hill 41' (o.g.); Sidwell (red card) 79'; Riether (yellow card) 89'; Senderos (yellow card) 90+2'	Report	Hill (yellow card) 14'; Taarabt 45'	Stadium: Craven Cottage; Attendance: 25,117; Referee: Lee Probert

7 April 2013 31	Newcastle United	1–0	Fulham	Newcastle
15:00 BST	Sissoko (yellow card) 47'; Cissé 90+3', (yellow card) 90+4'	Report	Senderos (yellow card) 50'; Riise (yellow card) 90'	Stadium: St James' Park; Attendance: 51,847; Referee: Kevin Friend

13 April 2013 32	Aston Villa	1–1	Fulham	Birmingham
15:00 BST	N'Zogbia 55'; Sylla (yellow card) 69'	Report	Enoh (yellow card) 58'; Delph 66' (o.g.); Richardson (yellow card) 87'	Stadium: Villa Park; Attendance: 37,011; Referee: Phil Dowd

17 April 2013 33	Fulham	0–3	Chelsea	London
20:00 BST	Ruiz (yellow card) 44'; Senderos (yellow card) 47'	Report	Ivanović (yellow card) 18'; David Luiz 30'; Terry 43', 71'	Stadium: Craven Cottage; Attendance: 25,002; Referee: Mike Dean

20 April 2013 34	Fulham	0–1	Arsenal	London
15:00 BST	Sidwell (red card) 12'	Report	Mertesacker 43'; Arteta (yellow card) 52'; Ramsey (yellow card) 76'; Giroud (red card) 90'	Stadium: Craven Cottage; Attendance: 25,700; Referee: Andre Marriner

27 April 2013 35	Everton	1–0	Fulham	Liverpool
15:00 BST	Pienaar 16'; Osman (yellow card) 87'	Report	Enoh (yellow card) 30'; Emanuelson (yellow card) 71'; Manolev (yellow card) 90+4'	Stadium: Goodison Park; Attendance: 34,563; Referee: Jonathan Moss

4 May 2013 36	Fulham	2–4	Reading	Reading
15:00 BST	Senderos (yellow card) 27'; Ruiz 70', 77'; Enoh (yellow card) 87'	Report	Robson-Kanu 12' (pen.), 62'; Le Fondre 75'; Karacan 83'; Mariappa (yellow card) 84'	Stadium: Madejski Stadium; Attendance: 24,087; Referee: Neil Swarbrick

12 May 2013 37	Fulham	1–3	Liverpool	London
15:00 BST	Berbatov 33'	Report	Sturridge 36', 62', 85'; Johnson (yellow card) 52'	Stadium: Craven Cottage; Attendance: 25,640; Referee: Mark Halsey

19 May 2013 38	Swansea City	0–3	Fulham	Swansea
16:00 BST	Hernández (yellow card) 48'; Michu (yellow card) 89'	Report	Kačaniklić 22'; Riether (yellow card) 27'; Berbatov 77'; Emanuelson 90+3'	Stadium: Liberty Stadium; Attendance: 20,365; Referee: Lee Mason

=== Football League Cup ===
28 August 2012 2nd Round	Sheffield Wednesday	1–0	Fulham	Sheffield
19:45 BST	Madine 50' (pen.); Semedo (yellow card) 84'	Report	Sidwell (yellow card) 18'; Kasami (yellow card) 29'; Briggs (yellow card) 85'; Baird (yellow card) 90+3'	Stadium: Hillsborough Stadium; Attendance: 14,177; Referee: Paul Tierney

=== FA Cup ===
5 January 2013 3rd Round	Fulham	1–1	Blackpool	London
15:00 GMT	Briggs (yellow card) 53'; Karagounis 80'	Report	Basham (yellow card) 17'; Sylvestre 60'	Stadium: Craven Cottage; Attendance: 14,473; Referee: Lee Mason

15 January 2013 3rd Round Replay	Blackpool	1–2 (a.e.t.)	Fulham	Blackpool
20:00 GMT	Delfouneso 82'; Baptiste (yellow card) 101'	Report	Richardson (yellow card) 89', (goal) 90+4'; Riether (yellow card) 90'; Hangeland 116'	Stadium: Bloomfield Road; Attendance: 8,706; Referee: Andre Marriner

26 January 2013 4th Round	Manchester United	4–1	Fulham	Manchester
17:30 GMT	Giggs 3' (pen.); Rooney 50'; Hernández 52', 66'	Report	Hughes 76'	Stadium: Old Trafford; Attendance: 72,596; Referee: Mark Clattenburg

== Squad statistics ==
=== Appearances & goals ===
Last updated 19 May 2013

No.	Pos	Nat	Player	Total		Premier League		FA Cup		League Cup	
No.	Pos	Nat	Player	Apps	Goals	Apps	Goals	Apps	Goals	Apps	Goals
1	GK	(Australia) AUS	Mark Schwarzer	39	0	36+0	0	2+0	0	1+0	0
3	DF	(Norway) NOR	John Arne Riise	32	0	29+2	0	1+0	0	0+0	0
4	DF	(Switzerland) SUI	Philippe Senderos	22	0	18+3	0	1+0	0	0+0	0
5	DF	(Norway) NOR	Brede Hangeland	39	1	35+0	0	3+0	1	1+0	0
6	DF	(Northern Ireland) NIR	Chris Baird	22	2	14+5	2	2+0	0	1+0	0
7	MF	(England) ENG	Steve Sidwell	30	4	23+4	4	2+0	0	1+0	0
9	FW	(Bulgaria) BUL	Dimitar Berbatov	35	15	32+1	15	2+0	0	0+0	0
10	FW	(Croatia) CRO	Mladen Petrić	24	5	9+14	5	1+0	0	0+0	0
11	FW	(Costa Rica) CRC	Bryan Ruiz	31	5	26+3	5	2+0	0	0+0	0
12	MF	(Ghana) GHA	Emmanuel Frimpong	6	0	2+4	0	0+0	0	0+0	0
14	MF	(Greece) GRE	Giorgos Karagounis	28	2	20+5	1	2+1	1	0+0	0
15	MF	(England) ENG	Kieran Richardson	16	2	12+2	1	0+2	1	0+0	0
16	MF	(Republic of Ireland) IRL	Damien Duff	34	3	27+4	3	2+0	0	1+0	0
18	DF	(Northern Ireland) NIR	Aaron Hughes	28	1	23+1	0	2+1	1	1+0	0
19	MF	(Mali) MLI	Mahamadou Diarra	8	0	7+1	0	0+0	0	0+0	0
20	FW	(Colombia) COL	Hugo Rodallega	33	3	14+15	3	1+2	0	1+0	0
21	MF	(Turkey) TUR	Kerim Frei	8	0	2+5	0	0+1	0	0+0	0
24	MF	(Iran) IRI	Ashkan Dejagah	24	0	13+8	0	2+1	0	0+0	0
25	DF	(Bulgaria) BUL	Stanislav Manolev	5	0	4+1	0	0+0	0	0+0	0
27	DF	(Germany) GER	Sascha Riether	39	1	35+0	1	3+0	0	0+1	0
28	MF	(Netherlands) NED	Urby Emanuelson	13	1	5+8	1	0+0	0	0+0	0
29	MF	(Wales) WAL	Simon Davies	0	0	0+0	0	0+0	0	0+0	0
31	MF	(Sweden) SWE	Alexander Kačaniklić	24	4	16+4	4	3+0	0	1+0	0
33	MF	(Cameroon) CMR	Eyong Enoh	9	0	8+1	0	0+0	0	0+0	0
38	GK	(Philippines) PHI	Neil Etheridge	0	0	0+0	0	0+0	0	0+0	0
40	DF	(England) ENG	Alex Smith	1	0	0+1	0	0+0	0	0+0	0
Players who are no longer playing for Fulham or who have been loaned out:
2	DF	(Republic of Ireland) IRL	Stephen Kelly	3	0	0+2	0	0+0	0	1+0	0
8	MF	(Switzerland) SUI	Pajtim Kasami	3	0	0+2	0	0+0	0	1+0	0
13	GK	(England) ENG	David Stockdale	3	0	2+0	0	1+0	0	0+0	0
17	DF	(England) ENG	Matthew Briggs	8	0	3+2	0	2+0	0	1+0	0
22	GK	(Hungary) HUN	Csaba Somogyi	0	0	0+0	0	0+0	0	0+0	0
30	MF	(Belgium) BEL	Mousa Dembélé	2	0	2+0	0	0+0	0	0+0	0
39	FW	(Italy) ITA	Marcello Trotta	1	0	0+0	0	0+0	0	0+1	0

=== Top scorers ===
Includes all competitive matches. The list is sorted by squad number when total goals are equal.

Last updated on 19 May 2013

Rank	No.	Player	Premier League	League Cup	FA Cup	Total
1	9	(Bulgaria) Dimitar Berbatov	15	0	0	15
2	10	(Croatia) Mladen Petrić	5	0	0	5
2	11	(Costa Rica) Bryan Ruiz	5^{[a]}	0	0	5
4	16	(England) Steve Sidwell	4	0	0	4
4	31	(Sweden) Alexander Kačaniklić	4	0	0	4
6	16	(Republic of Ireland) Damien Duff	3	0	0	3
6	20	(Colombia) Hugo Rodallega	3	0	0	3
8	6	(Northern Ireland) Chris Baird	2	0	0	2
8	14	(Greece) Giorgos Karagounis	1	0	1	2
8	15	(England) Kieran Richardson	1	0	1	2
11	5	(Norway) Brede Hangeland	0	0	1	1
11	18	(Northern Ireland) Aaron Hughes	0	0	1	1
11	27	(Germany) Sascha Riether	1	0	0	1
11	28	(Netherlands) Urby Emanuelson	1	0	0	1
#	Own Goals		5	0	0	5
TOTALS			50	0	4	54

a. The Premier League's Dubious Goals Panel ruled that Fulham's first goal against Everton on 3 November 2012 was in fact a Bryan Ruiz goal and therefore has not been credited as an own goal by Tim Howard.

=== Disciplinary record ===
Includes all competitive matches. The list is sorted by position, and then shirt number.

N	P	Nat.	Name	Premier League			League Cup			FA Cup			Other			Total			Notes
N	P	Nat.	Name	Yellow card	Second yellow card	Red card	Yellow card	Second yellow card	Red card	Yellow card	Second yellow card	Red card	Yellow card	Second yellow card	Red card	Yellow card	Second yellow card	Red card	Notes
1	GK	(Australia)	Schwarzer																
13	GK	(England)	Stockdale																
3	DF	(Norway)	Riise	4												4			
4	DF	(Switzerland)	Senderos	6												6			
5	DF	(Norway)	Hangeland	2		1										2		1	
6	DF	(Northern Ireland)	Baird	5			1									6			
17	DF	(England)	Briggs				1			1						2			
18	DF	(Northern Ireland)	Hughes	1												1			
25	DF	(Bulgaria)	Manolev	2												2			
27	DF	(Germany)	Riether	4						1						5			
7	MF	(England)	Sidwell	7		2	1									8		2	
8	MF	(Switzerland)	Kasami				1									1			
12	MF	(Ghana)	Frimpong	1												1			
14	MF	(Greece)	Karagounis	3												3			
15	MF	(England)	Richardson	2						1						3			
16	MF	(Ireland)	Duff																
19	MF	(Mali)	Diarra	1												1			
21	MF	(Turkey)	Frei																
24	MF	(Iran)	Dejagah	3												3			
28	MF	(Netherlands)	Emanuelson	1												1			
29	MF	(Wales)	Davies																
31	MF	(Sweden)	Kačaniklić																
33	MF	(Cameroon)	Enoh	3												3			
9	FW	(Bulgaria)	Berbatov	1												1			
10	FW	(Croatia)	Petrić																
11	FW	(Costa Rica)	Ruiz	2												2			
20	FW	(Colombia)	Rodallega																

Last updated: 19 May 2013
Source: Fixtures
Ordered by (red card) , (second yellow card) and (yellow card)
(yellow card) = Number of bookings; (second yellow card) = Number of sending offs after a second yellow card; (red card) = Number of sending offs by a direct red card.

==== Suspensions ====
Player	Date Received	Offence	Length of suspension	
(Northern Ireland) Chris Baird	(yellow card) v Arsenal, 10 November	5 cautions	1 Match	Sunderland (H), Premier League
(Norway) Brede Hangeland	(red card) v Sunderland, 18 November	Serious foul play	3 Matches	Stoke (A), Chelsea (A), Tottenham Hotspur (H), Premier League
(England) Steve Sidwell	(yellow card) v Queens Park Rangers, 15 December	5 cautions	1 Match	Liverpool (A), Premier League
(England) Steve Sidwell	(red card) v Queens Park Rangers, 1 April	Serious foul play	3 Matches	Newcastle (A), Aston Villa (A), Chelsea (H), Premier League
(England) Steve Sidwell	(red card) v Arsenal, 20 April	Serious foul play	4 Matches	Everton (A), Reading (H), Liverpool (H), Swansea City (A), Premier League
