= Robin Kačaniklić =

Swedish footballer

Personal information
- Date of birth: 25 August 1988 (age 38)
- Place of birth: Bjuv, Sweden
- Height: 1.83 m (6 ft 0 in)
- Position: Midfielder

Team information
- Current team: Eskilsminne IF

Youth career
- Nyvångs GIF
- Åstorps FF
- –2006: Helsingborgs IF

Senior career*
Years	Team	Apps	(Gls)
2006–2007	Helsingborgs IF	1	(0)
2008–2009	Mjällby AIF	5	(0)
2010–2011	Brumunddal Fotball	10	(5)
2011	FC Nordsjælland	0	(0)
2012	FK Teleoptik	1	(0)
2013–2014	Kristianstads FF	22	(2)
2014	Örgryte IS	5	(0)
2015–	Eskilsminne IF	9	(0)

International career
2003–2005	Sweden U17	16	(3)
2005	Sweden U19	3	(0)
- * Club domestic league appearances and goals as of 1 September 2015

Robin Kačaniklić (Serbian Cyrillic: Робин Качаниклић, Macedonian: Робин Качаниклиќ; born 25 August 1988) is a Swedish footballer who plays for Real Åstorp FF as a midfielder. He is older brother to the former Sweden national team player Alexander Kačaniklić.
