= Alexander Kačaniklić =

Swedish footballer

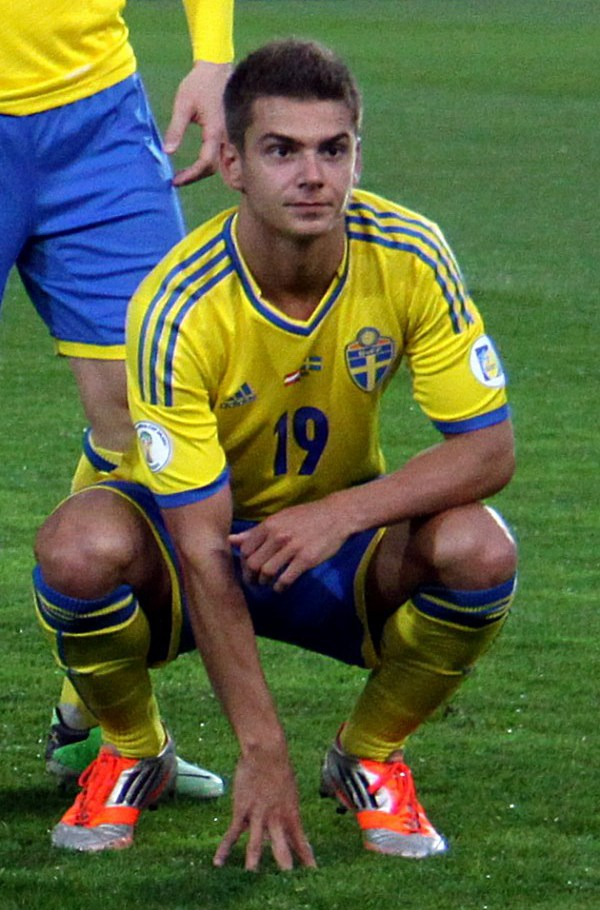
- Kačaniklić playing for Sweden in 2013

Personal information
- Full name: Alexander Kačaniklić
- Date of birth: 13 August 1991 (age 35)
- Place of birth: Helsingborg, Sweden
- Height: 1.81 m (5 ft 11 in)
- Position: Winger

Youth career
- Nyvångs GIF
- –2000: Åstorps FF
- 2000–2007: Helsingborgs IF
- 2007–2010: Liverpool
- 2010–2012: Fulham

Senior career*
Years	Team	Apps	(Gls)
2012–2016	Fulham	84	(10)
2012	→ Watford (loan)	12	(1)
2013	→ Burnley (loan)	6	(0)
2014	→ Copenhagen (loan)	7	(2)
2016–2018	Nantes	26	(0)
2017	Nantes II	1	(0)
2019–2020	Hammarby IF	48	(14)
2021–2022	Hajduk Split	24	(2)
2022–2025	AEL Limassol	11	(4)
Total		219	(33)

International career
2006–2008	Sweden U17	9	(1)
2008–2009	Sweden U19	9	(1)
2012–2020	Sweden	21	(3)
- * Club domestic league appearances and goals

Alexander Kačaniklić (Serbian Cyrillic: Александар Качаниклић; Macedonian: Александар Качаниклиќ; Serbian pronunciation: [alɛksǎːndar kaʨǎniːkliʨ]; born 13 August 1991) is a Swedish former professional footballer. He normally operated as a winger but could also play as a central midfielder. A full international between 2012 and 2020, he won 21 caps and scored three goals for the Sweden national team.

== Club career ==
=== Youth career ===
Born in Helsingborg, Kačaniklić played for a local team until he joined Helsingborgs IF, alongside his brother, at the age of ten. Kačaniklić joined Liverpool from Swedish club Helsingborg in the summer of 2007, where he was assigned to the club's academy. It came after when Kačaniklić was scouted while playing for Sweden U16. During his progress, the club's U18 Manager Hughie McAuley said: "Alex is a talented player and has already played at reserve team level. He is a naturally gifted footballer who is very quick. He crosses really good balls and can also be effective on the right wing when he cuts inside and scores goals. I'm looking forward to seeing him make more progress."

He scored "a wonderful effort" against Arsenal's youth team in the 2008–09 FA Youth Cup Final. Two years later, Kačaniklić graduated from the academy to the club's reserves, where he was featured under John McMahon. It was reported in February 2010 that Kačaniklić could get a chance in Liverpool's first team football ahead of the UEFA Europa League match. But he never made it to the starting line-up. At the end of the 2009–10 season, Kačaniklić was offered a two–year contract with the club.

He moved on to Fulham in August 2010, together with Lauri Dalla Valle, as part of the deal in which Fulham's Paul Konchesky joined Liverpool. After leaving Liverpool, Kačaniklić reflected his time there, saying: "I left because I saw an opportunity to make a career for myself and develop as a player and a person. I had some really good years at Liverpool and they helped me a lot and England is the country where I want to play, so it was an easy decision to leave Sweden. It is difficult moving so young. It is a different lifestyle in England compared to Sweden and I left all the comforts I had at home, in terms of my friends and school. But having my family here made it so much easier and I am so grateful to them for that."

=== Fulham ===
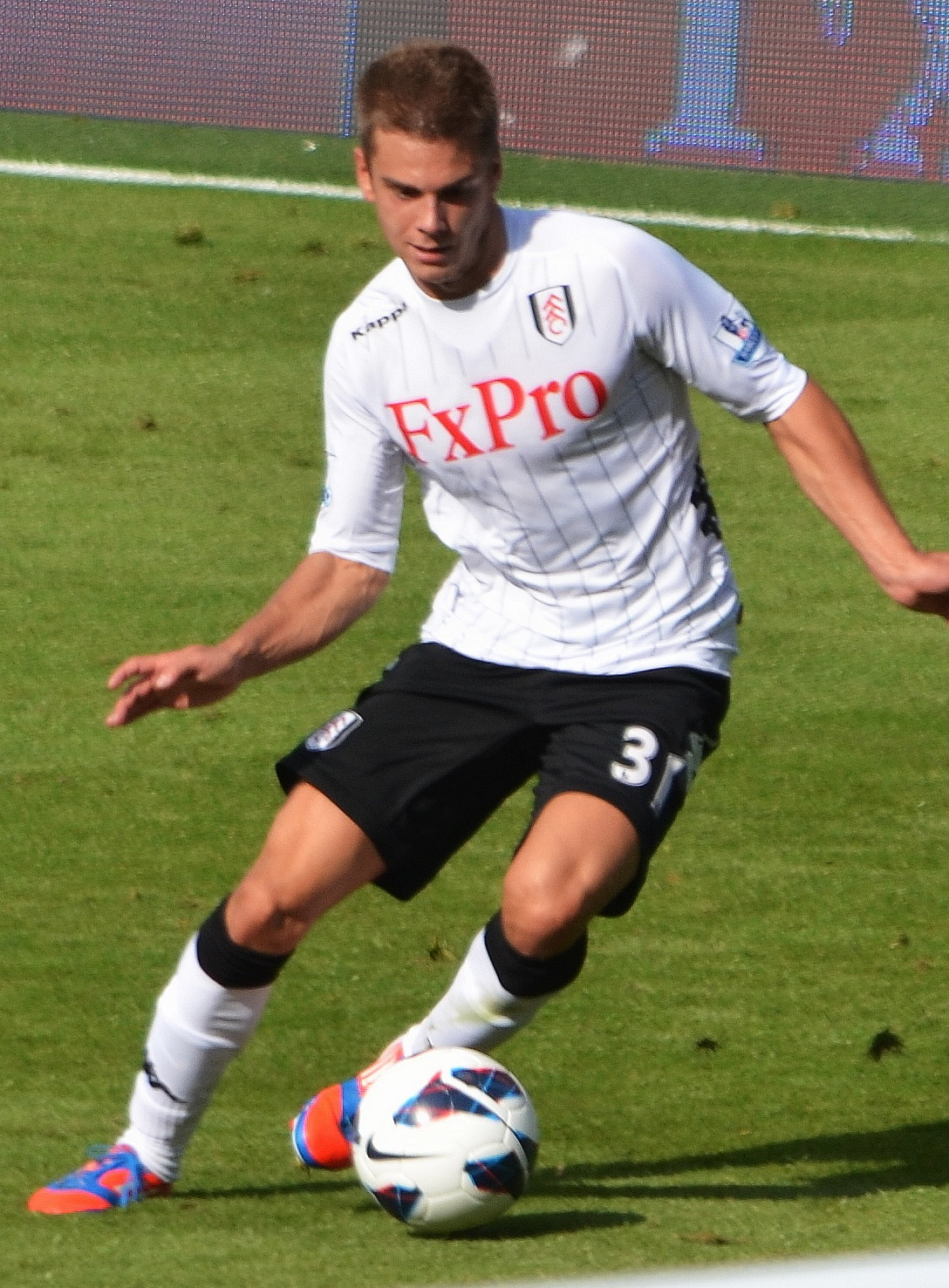
Kačaniklić playing for Fulham in September 2012.

After almost two years with the Fulham Reserves, Kačaniklić was an unused substitute as Fulham drew with Sunderland on 19 November 2011. He made his Fulham debut on 30 March 2012, coming on as a substitute for the injured Pavel Pogrebnyak after 35 minutes. He almost scored a goal, as a clipped shot was parried by Norwich goalkeeper John Ruddy and hit the crossbar. He was praised by Martin Jol in his post-match press conference. He made his first start for Fulham in an away match against Bolton Wanderers on 7 April 2012. Fulham won the match 0–3, and Kačaniklić was subbed off after 88 minutes for fellow Academy graduate Marcello Trotta, who made his Premier League debut for Fulham. Shortly before the match, Jol confirmed that Fulham would offer Kačaniklić a new contract. In a 1–0 win over Liverpool on 1 May 2012, Kačaniklić set up the only goal of the game when "he was a constant threat to Liverpool's backline, especially in the first half, and certainly played his part in the goal when John Arne Riise's cross hit him before rebounding off Martin Škrtel into the back of the net". Following this, Kačaniklić received a handful first team appearances, result in him making four appearances at the end of the 2011–12 season.

Ahead of the 2012–13 season, Kačaniklić signed a new two-year deal with the option of a third year to stay at Craven Cottage. It came after when he was linked a move away from the club. Kačaniklić scored his first goal for Fulham in the 5–0 drubbing at home against Norwich on the opening day of the 2012–13 season. Since the start of the season, he became a first team regular for the side, playing in the midfield position. Kačaniklić had a good start to the season, assisting both of Dimitar Berbatov's goals on 15 September 2012 against West Bromwich Albion, resulting a 3–0 win for Fulham. He scored a header at Arsenal on 10 November 2012 in a 3–3 draw. Kačaniklić then scored the winner in Fulham's 2–1 victory away to West Bromwich Albion on New Year's Day. However, injuries and competitions in the midfield positions soon led him losing his first team place and appeared on the substitute bench, resulting out on loan to Burnley. After being recalled on 18 April 2013, Kačaniklić made his first appearance for Fulham two days later, starting the whole game before being substituted in the 85th minute, in a 1–0 loss against Arsenal. Two weeks later on 4 May 2013, he set up a goal for Bryan Ruiz, who went to score twice, in a 4–2 loss against Reading. Kačaniklić then scored his fourth goal of the season, as well as, setting up the club's third goal of the game, in a 3–0 win over Swansea City in the last game of the season. After the match, he was named Sky Sports’ Team of the Week. At the end of the 2012–13 season, Kačaniklić went on to make thirty appearances and scoring four times in all competitions.

However at the start of the 2013–14 season, Kačaniklić suffered a hamstring injury that saw him miss the opening game of the season against Sunderland. It wasn't until on 24 August 2013 when he made his first appearance of the season, coming on as a substitute in the 61st minute, in a 3–1 loss against Arsenal. Following this, Kačaniklić was involved in a lot of playing time for the side. After sitting out of the first team for two matches, he returned to the starting line-up, coming on as an 80th-minute substitute, in a 2–0 loss against Southampton on 26 October 2013. In a follow–up, Kačaniklić scored his first goal of the season, in a 3–1 loss against Manchester United. He then set up two goals in two matches on 8 December 2013 and 14 December 2013. On 23 January 2014, Kačaniklić signed a one-year extension to his contract, keeping him at Fulham until June 2015. However, Kačaniklić soon found his playing time reduced later in the 2013–14 season, due to being placed on the substitute bench. As a result, the club were later relegated to the Championship after losing 4–1 to Stoke City. Sky Sports said about his performance, saying: "Kacaniklic hasn't fared much better, with his most noteworthy act all season coming when he scored a consolation with his side three-goals down at home to Manchester United." At the end of the 2013–14 season, Kačaniklić made twenty–nine appearances and scoring once in all competitions.

In the 2014–15 season, Kačaniklić made one appearances for the side before joining FC Copenhagen by the end of August. After being recalled by Fulham following his loan spell at FC Copenhagen ended, his first appearance for the side since August came on 10 January 2015, coming on as a substitute in the 61st minute, in a 1–0 draw against Cardiff City. Seven days later on 17 January 2015, Kačaniklić scored his first goal of the season, in a 2–1 win over Reading. Following this, he regained his first team place for Fulham and appeared in the starting line-up, Kačaniklić scored his second goal of the season, in a 2–0 win over Huddersfield Town on 23 March 2015. However, injuries continued to struck him on two occasions, including one for the remaining matches of the 2014–15 season. Despite this, he went on to make sixteen appearances and scoring two times in all competitions in the 2014–15 season.

In the 2015–16 season, Kačaniklić scored on his first appearance of the season, in a 1–0 win against Wycombe Wanderers in the first round of the League Cup. Kačaniklić then scored his second goal of the season, in a 4–2 win over Reading on 24 October 2015. He later scored two more goals for the side later in the season against Birmingham City and Rotherham United. However, he, once again, found himself in and out of the first team throughout the 2015–16 season, due to the club's change of management. Kačaniklić also faced concern with injuries along the way. At the end of the 2015–16 season, he went on to make twenty–seven appearances and scoring four times in all competitions. Following this, Kačaniklić were among four players to be released by the club upon expiry of his contract.

==== Loan to Watford ====
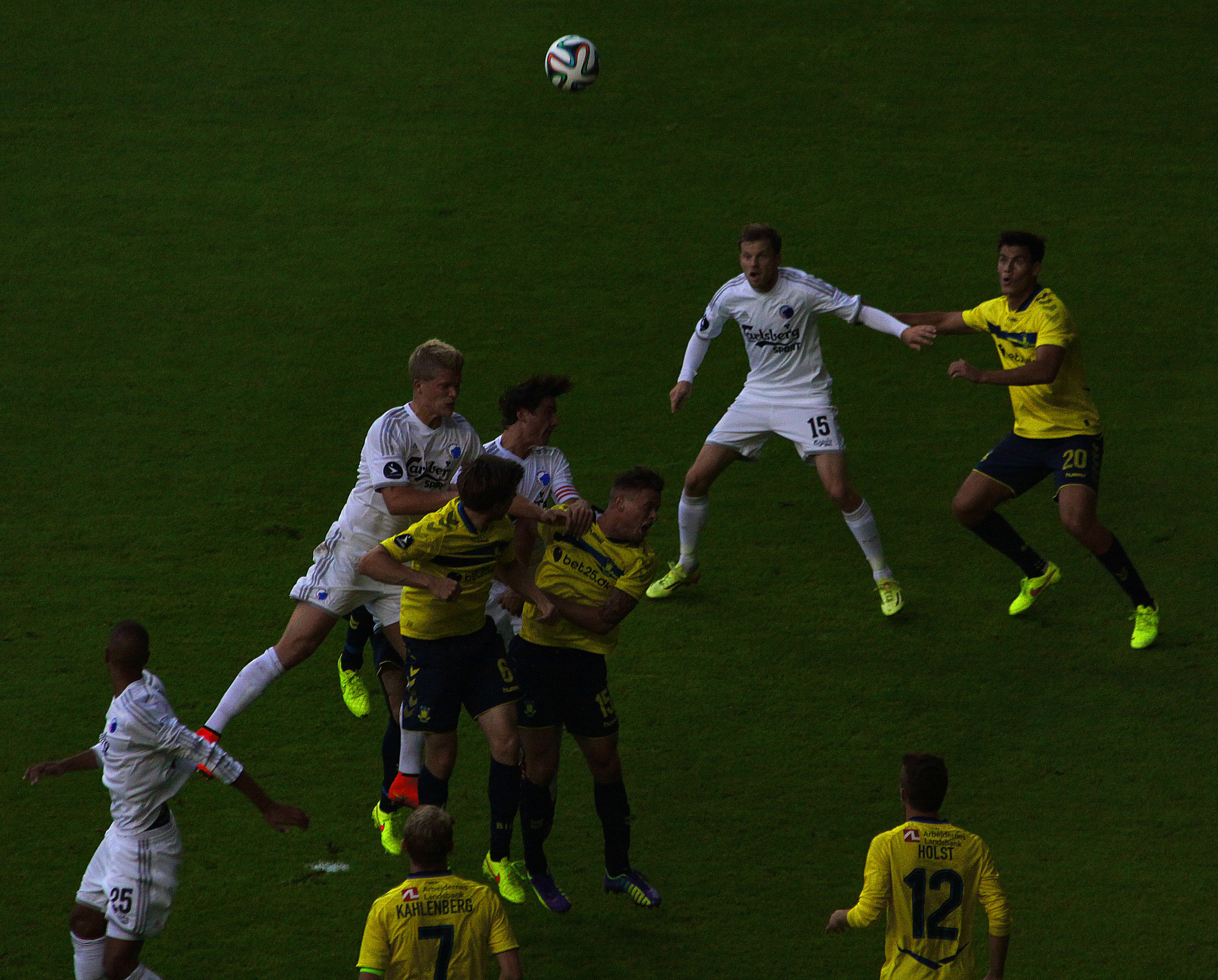
Kačaniklić playing for Copenhagen against Brøndby on 21 September 2014.

On 30 January 2012, Kačaniklić joined Championship club Watford on a youth loan until the end of the season. He made his debut the next day, starting the whole game before being substituted in the 74th minute and set up two goals, in a 2–0 away win against Millwall. In a follow–up match, Kačaniklić set up the opening goal for John Eustace, who went on to score twice, in a 2–1 win over Barnsley. Kačaniklić scored his first goal in a 3–2 home win against Burnley on 3 March 2012. After a series of impressive displays and becoming a first team regular for Watford, Kačaniklić was recalled by his parent club, Fulham, on 27 March 2012.

==== Loan to Burnley ====
On 1 March 2013, Kačaniklić joined Championship side Burnley on loan until the end of the 2012–2013 season, and was given the number 19 shirt. He made his Burnley debut against Charlton Athletic on 2 March 2013, playing the full 90 minutes and setting up the only goal of the game in a 1–0 win for Burnley. Kačaniklić was featured in the first team for the next four matches before losing his place by the beginning of April. He was recalled by Fulham on 18 April 2013. By the time Kačaniklić was recalled, he made six appearances for the side.

==== Loan to Copenhagen ====
Kačaniklić signed on a season-long loan for Copenhagen on 1 September 2014 after signing a contract extension until 2016 with Fulham. He made his Copenhagen debut, starting the whole game, in a 1–0 loss against Aalborg on 13 September 2014. Five days later on 18 September 2014, Kačaniklić made his European debut, starting the whole game, in a 2–0 win over HJK Helsinki. He scored his first goal for the club, in a 1–1 draw against SønderjyskE on 27 September 2014. Kačaniklić’s second goal came on 19 October 2014, in a 1–0 win over Randers. After missing two matches due to an injury, he returned to the starting line-up for the side, playing 68 minutes before being substituted, in a 1–1 draw against SønderjyskE on 2 November 2014. After playing 13 matches, scoring 2 goals in the autumn 2014, on 15 December 2014, Fulham took advantage of an option in the loan deal, making him return to London.

=== Nantes ===
On 15 June 2016, it was announced that Kačaniklić had signed a four-year deal with Nantes on a free transfer following his release by Fulham.

After missing the opening game of the season, Kačaniklić made his FC Nantes debut, coming on as a substitute for Jules Iloki in the 23rd minute, and played for the rest of the match, as they lost 1–0 against AS Monaco on 20 August 2016. It wasn't until on 21 September 2016 when he made his first start for the club, playing 75 minutes, in a 0–0 draw against Saint-Étienne. However, Kačaniklić found himself placed on the substitute bench, as a result of a pecking order in the midfield competitions. By December, he was dropped from the first team and appeared once over the next two months. With a speculation over his FC Nantes’ future, Kačaniklić said he will stay at the club following talks with Manager Sérgio Conceição. However, Kačaniklić continued to remain on the substitute bench at times for the rest of the 2016–17 season. Despite this, he received more playing time between 11 March 2017 and 16 April 2017 and later contributed two assists: the first one came against Montpellier on 11 March 2017 and the second one came against Saint-Étienne on 9 April 2017. At the end of the 2016–17 season, Kačaniklić went on to make nineteen appearances in all competitions.

In the 2017–18 season, Kačaniklić started the first two league matches of the season before suffering an injury in the first half and was substituted, in a 1–0 loss against Marseille on 12 August 2017. As a result, Kačaniklić was sidelined for two matches before returning to the substitute bench against Montpellier on 9 September 2017. However, his return was short–lived when he suffered an injury once again. It wasn't until on 25 October 2017 when Kačaniklić returned to the starting line-up and played 60 minutes before being substituted, in a 3–1 loss against Tours FC in the third round of the Coupe de la Ligue. Even after making a return, he continued to spend the rest of the year on the sidelines, due to injuries and placed on the substitute bench. With his first team opportunities limited at FC Nantes, Kačaniklić stayed at the club despite being linked a move away from the January transfer window. It wasn't until on 17 January 2018 when he made his first appearance in almost three months, coming on as a second-half substitute, in a 1–1 draw against Toulouse. Kačaniklić then appeared in the next four matches, including setting up one of the goals, in a 3–0 win over Guingamp on 27 January 2018. Following this, he returned to the substitute bench for the remaining matches of the 2017–18 season.

The 2018–19 season saw Kačaniklić make no appearances for the side. It was announced on 28 December 2018 that he agreed the termination of his contract with Nantes. Shortly after leaving the club, Kačaniklić spoke out about his teammate Emiliano Sala.

=== Hammarby IF ===
On 9 February 2019, Kačaniklić signed a three-year contract with Hammarby IF in Allsvenskan, marking his return to Sweden for the first time in twelve years. Upon joining the club, he said: "It's nice that it's finally done and I'm extremely happy to be here."

Kačaniklić made his Hammarby IF debut in the opening game of the season against IF Elfsborg, where he started and played 71 minutes before being substituted, in a 1–1 draw. However, Kačaniklić suffered an injury that saw him sidelined for three matches. His bad start to his Hammarby IF's career led the Swedish media to debate whether Kačaniklić is a flop. It wasn't until on 5 May 2019 when Kačaniklić returned from injury, coming on as a late substitute, in a 3–2 win over Örebro. Since returning to the first team from injury, he quickly regained his first team place for the side. His first goal in Hammarby came at home against Falkenbergs FF on 7 July 2019, in a 6–2 win, where he also scored two more and assisted to one. It was Kačaniklić's first hat-trick at senior level. Following the match, Aftonbladet named him Allsvenskan's Team of the Week for Round 14. Two weeks later on 22 July 2019, he scored his fourth goal for the club, in a 5–2 win over Elfsborg, followed up by scoring the club's second goal of the game, in a 6–1 win over AFC Eskilstuna. His performance for the side had convincingly led the Swedish media to call him a flop earlier in the season. His goal scoring form continued throughout August, scoring against Helsingborg, GIF Sundsvall and IFK Luleå. His performance attracted from Eredivisie champions, Ajax and Turkish side Beşiktaş. Amid the transfer rumours, Kačaniklić was sidelined on two occasions throughout September. Despite this, he returned to the starting line-up and later played a role, scoring victories against title contenders, Djurgården and Malmö to keep Hammarby IF's hopes alive. In the last game of the season against BK Häcken, Kačaniklić scored the club's opening goal of the game and then set up the club's second goal, in a 4–1 win but was unable to win the Allsvenskan, due to different results, leading Djurgården becoming champions and Hammarby finishing third place. In his first season at Hammarby IF, he went on to make twenty–six appearances and scored eleven times in all competitions.

=== Hajduk Split ===
On 15 February 2021, Kačaniklić transferred to Hajduk Split in Prva HNL, signing a three-and-a-half-year contract. Reports suggested a transfer fee of around 7.5 million SEK. He made his debut for Hajduk on 27 February, in a 1–0 derby win over Rijeka. However, ahead of a Croatian Cup quarter-final against Gorica on 16 March, Kačaniklić got injured in training which forced him to miss the game, as Hajduk got eliminated by the Turopolje club. He recovered in time for the 3 April game against Lokomotiva, which Hajduk won 2–0. On 1 May, he scored his first goal in a 3–2 derby win over Rijeka.

== International career ==
=== Youth career ===
Kačaniklić has played international football for Sweden in UEFA European football championship games at under-17 and under-19 levels.

In February 2011, Kačaniklić was called up by Sweden U21. However, he was replaced the following month by Viktor Lundberg.

=== Senior career ===
On 15 August 2012, Kačaniklić was called up to the Sweden national team replacing Emir Bajrami for the match against Brazil. Kačaniklić previously considered to be shortlisted for the Sweden squad ahead of the UEFA Euro 2012, but didn't make the cut. He was introduced as a substitute with 25 minutes left, coming on for Christian Wilhelmsson. Sweden lost the friendly match to Brazil on a scoreline of 0–3.

On 12 October 2012, Kačaniklić played his first competitive international, in the 2014 World Cup UEFA Group C qualifiers. In the match against the Faroe Islands he was introduced in the 62nd minute, with the result then being 1–0 for the opposition. Only three minutes later, after a pass from Zlatan Ibrahimović, Kačaniklić scored his first goal for his country, levelling the score to 1–1. Ten minutes further into the game Ibrahimović netted as well and the game ended 2–1 in favour of Sweden. Four days later on 16 October 2012, Sweden played again in the same competition, this time against Germany. Kačaniklić again started as a substitute but after Germany completely outplayed Sweden in the first half, Kačaniklić and Kim Källström were introduced by Swedish coach Erik Hamrén. The score was then 3–0 for Germany, and in the 57th minute things would get even worse for Sweden as Mesut Özil made it 4–0. After that however, Sweden managed to do the unimaginable, and with great performances from half-time substitutes Källström and Kačaniklić, they scored four goals and the game ended 4–4. Kačaniklić, who set up Johan Elmander for his goal which made the score 4–3, received praise in various media for his effort.

The following year, Kačaniklić’s first appearance for the national side came on 6 February 2013, playing 77 minutes before being substituted, in a 3–2 loss against Argentina. He then scored his second goal for the national side when Zlatan Ibrahimović made a perfect pass to allow him easily nod the ball, in a 1–0 win against Macedonia on 3 June 2013. Four months later on 15 October 2013, Kačaniklić scored his third goal for the national side, in a 5–3 loss against Germany. A month later against Portugal in the play-offs round, he played in both legs, as Sweden lost 4–2 on aggregate. After the match, Kačaniklić said he and his teammates were sad over the loss. Three years later, Kačaniklić was shortlisted for the national side to potentially be in the squad ahead of UEFA Euro 2016 but didn't make the cut.

After a six-year absence, Kačaniklić was called up to the Sweden squad for the training tour in early 2020. He made his return on the pitch in a 1–0 friendly win against Moldova on 9 January 2020. Three days later on 12 January 2020, Kačaniklić captained the national side for the first time, starting the whole game, in a 1–0 win over Kosovo.

== Personal life ==
Kačaniklić's older brother Robin (born 1988) is a midfielder. Their father was born in Sweden to immigrants from SR Macedonia, a part of SFR Yugoslavia, of Serb descent. His family hails from Čučer-Sandevo. His father wanted him to play for Serbia, but he chose to represent Sweden. Growing up, Kačaniklić idolised Rivaldo and later Cristiano Ronaldo. He also grew up supporting Barcelona, citing the club's style of play. In addition to speaking Swedish, Kačaniklić can speak English and learned French during his time at Nantes.

== Career statistics ==
=== Club ===
As of 15 June 2022

Appearances and goals by club, season and competition
Club	Season	League			FA Cup		League Cup		Europe		Total	
Club	Season	Division	Apps	Goals	Apps	Goals	Apps	Goals	Apps	Goals	Apps	Goals
Fulham	2011–12	Premier League	4	0	0	0	0	0	0	0	4	0
Fulham	2012–13	Premier League	20	4	3	0	1	0	—		24	4
Fulham	2013–14	Premier League	23	1	3	0	3	0	—		29	1
Fulham	2014–15	Championship	14	2	2	0	0	0	—		16	2
Fulham	2015–16	Championship	23	3	1	0	3	1	—		27	4
Fulham	Total		84	10	9	0	7	1	0	0	100	11
Watford (loan)	2011–12	Championship	12	1	—		—		—		12	1
Burnley (loan)	2012–13	Championship	6	0	—		—		—		6	0
Copenhagen (loan)	2014–15	Superliga	7	2	1	0	0	0	5	0	13	2
Nantes	2016–17	Ligue 1	17	0	1	0	1	0	0	0	19	0
Nantes	2017–18	Ligue 1	9	0	2	0	1	0	0	0	12	0
Nantes	2018–19	Ligue 1	0	0	0	0	0	0	0	0	0	0
Nantes	Total		26	0	4	0	2	0	0	0	31	0
Hammarby	2019	Allsvenskan	25	10	4	1	—		—		29	11
Hammarby	2020	Allsvenskan	23	4	3	4	—		1	0	27	8
Hammarby	Total		48	14	7	5	0	0	1	0	56	18
Hajduk Split	2020–21	Prva HNL	14	2	1	0	—		2	0	17	2
Hajduk Split	2021–22	Prva HNL	10	0	2	0	—		—		12	0
Hajduk Split	Total		24	2	3	0	—		2	0	29	2
Career total			202	29	23	5	10	1	6	0	261	34

=== International ===
As of 12 January 2020

Appearances and goals by national team and year
National team	Year	Apps	Goals
Sweden	2012	4	1
Sweden	2013	12	2
Sweden	2014	3	0
Sweden	2015	0	0
Sweden	2016	0	0
Sweden	2017	0	0
Sweden	2018	0	0
Sweden	2019	0	0
Sweden	2020	2	0
Total		21	3

Scores and results list Sweden's goal tally first, score column indicates score after each Kačaniklić goal.

List of international goals scored by Alexander Kačaniklić
No.	Date	Venue	Opponent	Score	Result	Competition
1	12 October 2012	Tórsvøllur, Tórshavn, Faroe Islands	Faroe Islands	1–1	2–1	2014 FIFA World Cup qualifier
2	3 June 2013	Swedbank Stadion, Malmö, Sweden	Macedonia	1–0	1–0	Friendly
3	15 October 2013	Friends Arena, Solna, Sweden	Germany	2–0	3–5	2014 FIFA World Cup qualifier
