= 2012–13 MSV Duisburg season =

MSV Duisburg
2012–13 season
- Chairman: Andreas Rüttgers
- Manager: Kosta Runjaić
- 2. Fußball-Bundesliga: 11th place
- DFB-Pokal: Second round
- Top goalscorer: League: Sören Brandy (6); All: Sören Brandy (6)
| Home colours | Away colours | Third colours |

The 2012–13 MSV Duisburg season was the 113th season in the club's football history. In 2012–13 the club played in the 2. Fußball-Bundesliga, the second tier of German football. It was the clubs fifth consecutive season in this league, having played at this level since 2008–09, after it was relegated from the Fußball-Bundesliga in 2008.

The club also took part in the 2012–13 edition of the DFB-Pokal, the German Cup, where it reached the second round but lost to third division side Karlsruher SC next.

== Review and events ==
On August 25, coach Oliver Reck was sacked and Kosta Runjaić was announced as the new coach on September 3, 2012. The club was relegated after they were refused a license to play in the second division.

== Matches ==
=== Legend ===
Win Draw Loss Postponed

=== Friendly matches ===
| 30 June 2012 | TuS Borkum | 0–23 | MSV Duisburg | Borkum |
| 16:00 | | Report | Šukalo 11'; Kastrati 13', 21'; Wolze 18', 23', 41'; Gjasula 22', 29'; Jevtić 31'; Öztürk 39'; Exslager 49', 53', 70', 72', 74'; Domovchiyski 51', 88'; Jula 53', 65', 81'; Baljak 58', 87'; Brosinski 76' | Stadium: Sport-Trainingszentrum Bloemfontein; Attendance: 800 |

| 6 July 2012 | Bayer Leverkusen | 5–1 | MSV Duisburg | Leverkusen |
| 17:00 | Bellarabi 2'; Augusto 9'; Friedrich 32'; Kießling 45'; Hegeler 86' | Report | Brandy 25' | Stadium: Haberland-Stadion; Attendance: 700; Referee: Christian Bandurski (Essen) |

| 8 July 2012 | Waldhof Mannheim | 0–3 | MSV Duisburg | Mannheim |
| 15:00 | | Report | Šukalo 14'; Exslager 30'; Kastrati 86' | Stadium: Carl-Benz-Stadion; Attendance: 100 |

| 12 July 2012 | 1860 München | 4–0 | MSV Duisburg | Mindelheim |
| 18:30 | Nicu 34'; Stoppelkamp 36', 80'; Lauth 78' | Report | | Stadium: Mühlweg-Stadion; Attendance: 1,207 |

| 14 July 2012 | FC Memmingen | 2–1 | MSV Duisburg | Westerheim |
| 15:30 | Holzapfel 15'; Tastan 83' | Report | Domovchiyski 5' | Attendance: 877 |

| 18 July 2012 | KFC Uerdingen 05 | 0–3 | MSV Duisburg | Krefeld |
| 18:30 | | Report | Exslager 28'; Brandy 42', 59' | Stadium: Grotenburg-Stadion; Attendance: 1,400 |

| 21 July 2012 | MSV Duisburg | 2–0 | Heracles Almelo | Duisburg |
| 15:30 | Šukalo 21', 43' | Report | | Stadium: PCC-Stadion; Attendance: 1,397; Referee: Martin Thomsen (Kleve) |

| 29 July 2012 | MSV Duisburg | 0–1 | Twente Enschede | Duisburg |
| 14:30 | | Report | Fer 40' | Stadium: Schauinsland-Reisen-Arena; Attendance: 16,000; Referee: Sascha Stegemann (Niederkassel) |

| 4 September 2012 | MSV Duisburg | 2–0 | Al Rayyan | Duisburg |
| 18:00 | Brosinski 67'; Domovchiyski 80' | Report | | Stadium: Westender Straße; Attendance: 500 |

| 7 September 2012 | MSV Duisburg | 2–0 | Viktoria Köln | Duisburg |
| 18:00 | Brosinski 46'; Brandy 70' | Report | | Stadium: Westender Straße; Attendance: 831; Referee: Martin Thomsen (Kleve) |

| 11 October 2012 | Wuppertaler SV | 1–4 | MSV Duisburg | Wuppertal |
| 18:30 | Haas 12' | Report | Pamić 49'; Mandiangu 51'; Wolze 56' da Silva 75' | Stadium: Stadion am Zoo; Attendance: 400 |

| 8 January 2013 | KFC Uerdingen | 0–3 | MSV Duisburg | Krefeld |
| 19:00 | | Report | Wolze 3'; Domovchiyski 65'; Mandiangu 75' | Stadium: Grotenburg-Stadion; Attendance: 1,500 |

| 15 January 2013 | 1. FC Köln | 3–1 | MSV Duisburg | Antalya |
| 15:15 | Schnellhardt 71'; Royer 74'; Gerhardt 84' | Report | Gjasula 82' |

| 17 January 2013 | TSV Havelse | 1–2 | MSV Duisburg | Antalya |
| 15:30 | Vucinovic 47' | Report | Öztürk 7'; Leon 11' |

| 20 January 2013 | NK Osijek | 1–1 | MSV Duisburg | Antalya |
| 15:00 | Kvržić 27' | Report | Kern 11' (pen.) |

| 27 February 2013 | MSV Duisburg | 2–1 | Bayer Leverkusen II | Duisburg |
| | Lachheb 46'; Brandy 70' | Report | Mentizis 42' | Stadium: Westender Straße |

| 22 March 2013 | MSV Duisburg | 0–0 | Borussia Mönchengladbach | Duisburg |
| 18:00 | | Report | | Stadium: Schauinsland-Reisen-Arena; Attendance: 5,404; Referee: Martin Thomsen (Kleve) |

=== 2. Bundesliga ===
==== Results ====
| 5 August 2012 1 | MSV Duisburg | 1–4 | VfR Aalen | Duisburg |
| 13:30 | Bajić 14' | Report | Reichwein 20'; Dausch 33'; Kampl 46'; Lechleiter 60' | Stadium: Schauinsland-Reisen-Arena; Attendance: 14,377; Referee: Peter Sippel (Munich); Man of the Match: Kevin Kampl |

| 12 August 2012 2 | Jahn Regensburg | 2–0 | MSV Duisburg | Regensburg |
| 13:30 | Rahn 36'; Sembolo 60' | Report | | Stadium: Jahnstadion; Attendance: 7,818; Referee: Marco Fritz (Korb); Man of the Match: Francky Sembolo |

| 25 August 2012 3 | MSV Duisburg | 1–3 | Dynamo Dresden | Duisburg |
| 13:00 | Exslager 90+2' | Report | Ouali 4'; Losilla 20'; Poté 78' | Stadium: Schauinsland-Reisen-Arena; Attendance: 10,877; Referee: Tobias Christ (Münchweiler an der Rodalb); Man of the Match: Benjamin Kirsten |

| 31 August 2012 4 | 1860 München | 3–0 | MSV Duisburg | Munich |
| 18:00 | Lauth 2', 56'; Stoppelkamp 85' | Report | | Stadium: Allianz Arena; Attendance: 22,600; Referee: Norbert Grudzinski (Hamburg); Man of the Match: Benjamin Lauth |

| 16 September 2012 5 | 1. FC Kaiserslautern | 2–1 | MSV Duisburg | Kaiserslautern |
| 13:30 | Zuck 41'; Azaouagh 81' | Report | Domovchiyski 62' | Stadium: Fritz-Walter-Stadion; Attendance: 29,869; Referee: Christian Leicher (Landshut); Man of the Match: Ariel Borysiuk |

| 23 September 2012 6 | MSV Duisburg | 0–0 | VfL Bochum | Duisburg |
| 13:30 | | Report | | Stadium: Schauinsland-Reisen-Arena; Attendance: 15,017; Referee: Daniel Siebert (Berlin); Man of the Match: Goran Šukalo |

| 26 September 2012 7 | Eintracht Braunschweig | 3–0 | MSV Duisburg | Braunschweig |
| 17:30 | Pfitzner 80'; Merkel 83'; Kruppke 87' | Report | | Stadium: Eintracht-Stadion; Attendance: 19,115; Referee: Benjamin Cortus (Röthenbach); Man of the Match: Daniel Davari |

| 1 October 2012 8 | MSV Duisburg | 2–2 | Hertha BSC | Duisburg |
| 20:15 | Baljak 55', 72' | Report | Hubník 4'; Wagner 78' | Stadium: Schauinsland-Reisen-Arena; Attendance: 12,177; Referee: Martin Petersen (Stuttgart); Man of the Match: Srđan Baljak |

| 6 October 2012 9 | Energie Cottbus | 0–1 | MSV Duisburg | Cottbus |
| 13:00 | | Report | Šukalo 20' | Stadium: Stadion der Freundschaft; Attendance: 9,276; Referee: Christian Dietz (Kronach); Man of the Match: Goran Šukalo |

| 19 October 2012 10 | MSV Duisburg | 0–2 | Ingolstadt 04 | Duisburg |
| 18:00 | | Report | Leitl 64'; Caiuby 88' | Stadium: Schauinsland-Reisen-Arena; Attendance: 11,577; Referee: Bibiana Steinhaus (Hannover); Man of the Match: Stefan Leitl |

| 27 October 2012 11 | SV Sandhausen | 0–2 | MSV Duisburg | Sandhausen |
| 13:00 | | Report | Brandy 33', 60' | Stadium: Hardtwaldstadion; Attendance: 3,500; Referee: Christian Leicher (Landshut); Man of the Match: Sören Brandy |

| 3 November 2012 12 | MSV Duisburg | 1–2 | FSV Frankfurt | Duisburg |
| 13:00 | Exslager 80' | Report | Konrad 34'; Verhoek 38' | Stadium: Schauinsland-Reisen-Arena; Attendance: 8,617; Referee: Robert Kampka (Mainz); Man of the Match: Tim Heubach |

| 9 November 2012 13 | 1. FC Köln | 0–0 | MSV Duisburg | Cologne |
| 18:00 | | Report | | Stadium: RheinEnergieStadion; Attendance: 39,900; Referee: Jochen Drees (Münster-Sarmsheim); Man of the Match: Timo Horn |

| 18 November 2012 14 | MSV Duisburg | 2–1 | Erzgebirge Aue | Duisburg |
| 13:30 | Brosinski 29'; Brandy 66' | Report | Hochscheidt 42' | Stadium: Schauinsland-Reisen-Arena; Attendance: 10,136; Referee: Frank Willenborg (Osnabrück); Man of the Match: Felix Wiedwald |

| 25 November 2012 15 | FC St. Pauli | 4–1 | MSV Duisburg | Hamburg |
| 13:30 | Ginczek 18'; Bartels 65', 74'; Sağlık 89' | Report | Kern 45+1' | Stadium: Millerntor-Stadion; Attendance: 21,054; Referee: Sascha Stegemann (Niederkassel); Man of the Match: Fin Bartels |

| 28 November 2012 16 | MSV Duisburg | 1–2 | Union Berlin | Duisburg |
| 17:30 | Bajić 89' | Report | Brandy 20' (o.g.); Terodde 35' | Stadium: Schauinsland-Reisen-Arena; Attendance: 8,585; Referee: Robert Kempter (Sauldorf); Man of the Match: Fabian Schönheim |

| 2 December 2012 17 | Paderborn 07 | 0–2 | MSV Duisburg | Paderborn |
| 13:30 | | Report | Kern 58' (pen.); Perthel 68' | Stadium: Energieteam Arena; Attendance: 7,431; Referee: Benjamin Brand (Gerolzhofen); Man of the Match: Roland Müller |

| 7 December 2012 18 | VfR Aalen | 0–1 | MSV Duisburg | Aalen |
| 18:00 | | Report | Wolze 84' | Stadium: Scholz-Arena; Attendance: 4,555; Referee: Thorsten Schriever (Dorum); Man of the Match: Kevin Wolze |

| 16 December 2012 19 | MSV Duisburg | 4–2 | Jahn Regensburg | Duisburg |
| 13:30 | Šukalo 52'; Jovanović 61'; Brandy 63'; Brosinski 88' | Report | Sembolo 11'; Laurito 40' | Stadium: Schauinsland-Reisen-Arena; Attendance: 10,741; Referee: Christian Fischer (Hemer); Man of the Match: Ranisav Jovanović |

| 1 February 2013 20 | Dynamo Dresden | 0–0 | MSV Duisburg | Dresden |
| 18:00 | | Report | | Stadium: Glücksgas Stadion; Attendance: 23,353; Referee: Knut Kircher (Rottenburg); Man of the Match: Benjamin Kirsten |

| 9 February 2013 21 | MSV Duisburg | 1–3 | 1860 München | Duisburg |
| 13:00 | Jovanović 9' | Report | Wood 15'; Bülow 45'; Stoppelkamp 81' | Stadium: Schauinsland-Reisen-Arena; Attendance: 11,027; Referee: Marcel Unger (Halle); Man of the Match: Bobby Wood |

| 17 February 2013 22 | MSV Duisburg | 0–0 | 1. FC Kaiserslautern | Duisburg |
| 13:30 | | Report | | Stadium: Schauinsland-Reisen-Arena; Attendance: 13,725; Referee: Thorsten Schriever (Dorum) |

| 22 February 2013 23 | VfL Bochum | 2–2 | MSV Duisburg | Bochum |
| 18:00 | Sinkiewicz 51'; Kramer 56' | Report | Exslager 37'; Perthel 89' | Stadium: RewirpowerSTADION; Attendance: 14,127; Referee: Felix Brych (Munich); Man of the Match: Christoph Kramer |

| 4 March 2013 24 | MSV Duisburg | 1–0 | Eintracht Braunschweig | Duisburg |
| 20:15 | Exslager 62' | Report | | Stadium: Schauinsland-Reisen-Arena; Attendance: 11,770; Referee: Robert Hartmann (Wangen); Man of the Match: Maurice Exslager |

| 10 March 2013 25 | Hertha BSC | 4–2 | MSV Duisburg | Berlin |
| 13:30 | Ramos 12'; Ronny 24'; Allagui 57'; Brandy 64' (o.g.) | Report | Brandy 49'; Bomheuer 72' | Stadium: Olympic Stadium; Attendance: 31,635; Referee: Peter Sippel (Munich); Man of the Match: Ronny |

| 15 March 2013 26 | MSV Duisburg | 2–1 | Energie Cottbus | Duisburg |
| 18:00 | Jovanović 37'; Bajić 80' (pen.) | Report | Rivić 87' | Stadium: Schauinsland-Reisen-Arena; Attendance: 9,547; Referee: Benjamin Cortus (Röthenbach); Man of the Match: Ranisav Jovanović |

| 30 March 2013 27 | Ingolstadt 04 | 0–1 | MSV Duisburg | Ingolstadt |
| 13:00 | | Report | Jovanović 16' | Stadium: Audi Sportpark; Attendance: 5,546; Referee: Robert Kempter (Sauldorf); Man of the Match: Branimir Bajić |

| 7 April 2013 28 | MSV Duisburg | 2–1 | SV Sandhausen | Duisburg |
| 13:30 | Perthel 31'; Bajić 65' | Report | Fießer 34' | Stadium: Schauinsland-Reisen-Arena; Attendance: 11,354; Referee: Christian Dietz (Kronach); Man of the Match: Ranisav Jovanović |

| 13 April 2013 29 | FSV Frankfurt | 1–1 | MSV Duisburg | Frankfurt |
| 13:00 | Gaus 23' | Report | Brosinski 13' | Stadium: Frankfurter Volksbank Stadion; Attendance: 5,429; Referee: Marcel Unger (Halle); Man of the Match: Björn Schlicke |

| 22 April 2013 30 | MSV Duisburg | 1–1 | 1. FC Köln | Duisburg |
| 20:15 | Bomheuer 90' | Report | Bröker 23' | Stadium: Schauinsland-Reisen-Arena; Attendance: 27,029; Referee: Knut Kircher (Rottenburg); Man of the Match: Christian Clemens |

| 27 April 2013 31 | Erzgebirge Aue | 0–0 | MSV Duisburg | Aue |
| 13:00 | | Report | | Stadium: Erzgebirgsstadion; Attendance: 9,000; Referee: Robert Kampka (Mainz); Man of the Match: Fabian Müller |

| 5 May 2013 32 | MSV Duisburg | 0–0 | FC St. Pauli | Duisburg |
| 13:30 | | Report | | Stadium: Schauinsland-Reisen-Arena; Attendance: 18,239; Referee: Robert Kempter (Sauldorf); Man of the Match: Felix Wiedwald |

| 12 May 2013 33 | Union Berlin | 2–1 | MSV Duisburg | Berlin |
| 13:30 | Quiring 59'; Mattuschka 81' (pen.) | Report | Wolze 48' | Stadium: Stadion An der Alten Försterei; Attendance: 19,556; Referee: Benjamin Cortus (Röthenbach); Man of the Match: Christopher Quiring |

| 19 May 2013 34 | MSV Duisburg | 3–2 | Paderborn 07 | Duisburg |
| 13:30 | Perthel 12'; Bajić 61' (pen.); Brandy 77' | Report | Kachunga 21'; Vrančić 70' | Stadium: Schauinsland-Reisen-Arena; Attendance: 13,472; Referee: Florian Meyer (Burgdorf); Man of the Match: Daniel Brosinski |

==== League table ====
| Pos | Team | Pld | W | D | L | GF | GA | GD | Pts | Promotion, qualification or relegation |
|---|---|---|---|---|---|---|---|---|---|---|
| 9 | VfR Aalen | 34 | 12 | 10 | 12 | 40 | 39 | +1 | 46 | |
| 10 | FC St. Pauli | 34 | 11 | 10 | 13 | 44 | 47 | −3 | 43 | |
| 11 | MSV Duisburg (Note: MSV Duisburg were denied a license for the 2013–14 2. Bundesliga season, and, in accordance with the rules of the DFL (Deutsche Fußball Liga), Duisburg are replaced by the best-placed originally relegated team, SV Sandhausen.) (R) | 34 | 11 | 10 | 13 | 37 | 49 | −12 | 43 | Relegation to 3. Liga |
| 12 | SC Paderborn | 34 | 11 | 9 | 14 | 45 | 45 | 0 | 42 | |
| 13 | FC Ingolstadt | 34 | 10 | 12 | 12 | 36 | 43 | −7 | 42 | |

Source: kicker.de
Rules for classification: 1) points; 2) goal difference; 3) number of goals scored.
(R) Relegated

==== Results summary ====
| Overall | | | | | | | | Home | | | | | | Away | | | | | |
| Pld | W | D | L | GF | GA | GD | Pts | W | D | L | GF | GA | GD | W | D | L | GF | GA | GD |
|---|---|---|---|---|---|---|---|---|---|---|---|---|---|---|---|---|---|---|---|
| 34 | 11 | 10 | 13 | 37 | 49 | −12 | 43 | 7 | 5 | 6 | 23 | 26 | −3 | 4 | 5 | 7 | 14 | 23 | −9 |

Last updated: 19 May 2013.
Source: kicker.de

==== Result round by round ====
| Round | 1 | 2 | 3 | 4 | 5 | 6 | 7 | 8 | 9 | 10 | 11 | 12 | 13 | 14 | 15 | 16 | 17 | 18 | 19 | 20 | 21 | 22 | 23 | 24 | 25 | 26 | 27 | 28 | 29 | 30 | 31 | 32 | 33 | 34 |
|---|---|---|---|---|---|---|---|---|---|---|---|---|---|---|---|---|---|---|---|---|---|---|---|---|---|---|---|---|---|---|---|---|---|---|
| Ground | H | A | H | A | A | H | A | H | A | H | A | H | A | H | A | H | A | A | H | A | H | H | A | H | A | H | A | H | A | H | A | H | A | H |
| Result | L | L | L | L | L | D | L | D | W | L | W | L | D | W | L | L | W | W | W | D | L | D | D | W | L | W | W | W | D | D | D | D | L | W |
| Position | 18 | 18 | 18 | 18 | 18 | 18 | 18 | 18 | 18 | 18 | 18 | 18 | 17 | 16 | 16 | 17 | 15 | 14 | 14 | 14 | 14 | 15 | 15 | 13 | 14 | 13 | 13 | 11 | 10 | 14 | 12 | 10 | 13 | 11 |

Updated to match(es) played on 19 May 2013. Source: kicker.de
A = Away; H = Home; W = Win; D = Draw; L = Loss

=== DFB-Pokal ===
| 18 August 2012 First Round | Hallescher FC | 0–1 | MSV Duisburg | Halle |
| 15:30 | | Report | Šukalo 17' (pen.) | Stadium: Erdgas Sportpark; Attendance: 7,000; Referee: Robert Hartmann (Wangen) |

| 31 October 2012 Second Round | Karlsruher SC | 1–0 | MSV Duisburg | Karlsruhe |
| 19:00 | Kempe 88' | Report | | Stadium: Wildparkstadion; Attendance: 14,921; Referee: Tobias Stieler (Hamburg) |

== Squad and statistics ==
=== Squad, matches played and goals scored ===
As of 19 May 2013

| No. | Pos | Nat | Player | Total | | 2. Bundesliga | | DFB-Pokal | |
| No. | Pos | Nat | Player | Apps | Goals | Apps | Goals | Apps | Goals |
|---|---|---|---|---|---|---|---|---|---|
| 1 | GK | (Philippines) PHI | Roland Müller | 9 | 0 | 8 | 0 | 1 | 0 |
| 2 | DF | (Germany) GER | Julian Koch | 21 | 0 | 21 | 0 | 0 | 0 |
| 3 | DF | (Germany) GER | Markus Bollmann | 5 | 0 | 5 | 0 | 0 | 0 |
| 4 | DF | (Bosnia and Herzegovina) BIH | Džemal Berberović | 16 | 0 | 14 | 0 | 2 | 0 |
| 5 | DF | (Bosnia and Herzegovina) BIH | Branimir Bajić | 30 | 4 | 30 | 4 | 0 | 0 |
| 6 | DF | (Germany) GER | Benjamin Kern | 19 | 2 | 19 | 2 | 0 | 0 |
| 7 | MF | (Germany) GER | Daniel Brosinski | 34 | 3 | 32 | 3 | 2 | 0 |
| 8 | MF | (Germany) GER | Maurice Exslager | 28 | 4 | 26 | 4 | 2 | 0 |
| 9 | FW | (Bulgaria) BUL | Valeri Domovchiyski | 13 | 1 | 13 | 1 | 0 | 0 |
| 10 | MF | (Germany) GER | Jürgen Gjasula | 8 | 0 | 8 | 0 | 0 | 0 |
| 11 | FW | (Serbia) SRB | Srđan Baljak | 24 | 2 | 23 | 2 | 1 | 0 |
| 14 | FW | (Germany) GER | Sören Brandy | 34 | 6 | 32 | 6 | 2 | 0 |
| 15 | MF | (Slovenia) SVN | Goran Šukalo | 29 | 2 | 27 | 1 | 2 | 1 |
| 16 | DF | (Germany) GER | Stephan Hennen | 1 | 0 | 1 | 0 | 0 | 0 |
| 17 | MF | (Germany) GER | Kevin Wolze | 21 | 2 | 20 | 2 | 1 | 0 |
| 18 | GK | (Germany) GER | Felix Wiedwald | 29 | 0 | 27 | 0 | 2 | 0 |
| 19 | FW | (Norway) NOR | Flamur Kastrati | 4 | 0 | 3 | 0 | 1 | 0 |
| 19 | DF | (Austria) AUT | Andreas Ibertsberger | 7 | 0 | 7 | 0 | 0 | 0 |
| 21 | DF | (Germany) GER | Andre Hoffmann | 15 | 0 | 13 | 0 | 2 | 0 |
| 21 | MF | (Germany) GER | Sascha Dum | 11 | 0 | 11 | 0 | 0 | 0 |
| 22 | DF | (Germany) GER | Dustin Bomheuer | 27 | 2 | 25 | 2 | 2 | 0 |
| 23 | FW | (Germany) GER | Ranisav Jovanović | 27 | 4 | 26 | 4 | 1 | 0 |
| 24 | DF | (Germany) GER | Timo Perthel | 17 | 4 | 17 | 4 | 0 | 0 |
| 25 | DF | (Tunisia) TUN | Adli Lachheb | 19 | 0 | 17 | 0 | 2 | 0 |
| 26 | MF | (Germany) GER | Tanju Öztürk | 21 | 0 | 20 | 0 | 1 | 0 |
| 28 | MF | (Bosnia and Herzegovina) BIH | Dušan Jevtić | 1 | 0 | 1 | 0 | 0 | 0 |
| 30 | GK | (Germany) GER | Marcel Lenz | 0 | 0 | 0 | 0 | 0 | 0 |
| 31 | DF | (North Macedonia) MKD | Xhelil Abdulla | 0 | 0 | 0 | 0 | 0 | 0 |
| 33 | MF | (Croatia) CRO | Zvonko Pamić | 14 | 0 | 13 | 0 | 1 | 0 |
| 34 | MF | (Brazil) BRA | Antonio da Silva | 11 | 0 | 10 | 0 | 1 | 0 |
| | FW | (Germany) GER | Julien Rybacki | 1 | 0 | 1 | 0 | 0 | 0 |

=== Disciplinary record ===
| N | Pos. | Nat. | Name | Yellow card | Second yellow card | Red card | Notes |
|---|---|---|---|---|---|---|---|
| 1 | GK | (Philippines) | Roland Müller | 0 | 0 | 0 | |
| 2 | DF | (Germany) | Julian Koch | 7 | 0 | 0 | |
| 3 | DF | (Germany) | Markus Bollmann | 0 | 0 | 0 | |
| 4 | DF | (Bosnia and Herzegovina) | Džemal Berberović | 3 | 0 | 0 | |
| 5 | DF | (Bosnia and Herzegovina) | Branimir Bajić | 8 | 0 | 2 | |
| 6 | DF | (Germany) | Benjamin Kern | 2 | 0 | 0 | |
| 7 | MF | (Germany) | Daniel Brosinski | 2 | 0 | 0 | |
| 8 | FW | (Germany) | Maurice Exslager | 3 | 0 | 0 | |
| 9 | FW | (Bulgaria) | Valeri Domovchiyski | 0 | 0 | 0 | |
| 10 | MF | (Albania) | Jürgen Gjasula | 0 | 0 | 0 | |
| 11 | FW | (Serbia) | Srđan Baljak | 2 | 0 | 0 | |
| 14 | FW | (Germany) | Sören Brandy | 12 | 0 | 0 | |
| 15 | MF | (Slovenia) | Goran Šukalo | 11 | 1 | 1 | |
| 16 | DF | (Germany) | Stephan Hennen | 0 | 0 | 0 | |
| 17 | MF | (Germany) | Kevin Wolze | 7 | 1 | 0 | |
| 18 | GK | (Germany) | Felix Wiedwald | 3 | 0 | 1 | |
| 19 | FW | (Norway) | Flamur Kastrati | 0 | 0 | 0 | |
| 19 | DF | (Austria) | Andreas Ibertsberger | 3 | 0 | 0 | |
| 21 | DF | (Germany) | André Hoffmann | 5 | 0 | 0 | |
| 21 | MF | (Germany) | Sascha Dum | 0 | 0 | 0 | |
| 22 | DF | (Germany) | Dustin Bomheuer | 4 | 0 | 0 | |
| 23 | FW | (Germany) | Ranisav Jovanović | 8 | 0 | 0 | |
| 24 | DF | (Germany) | Timo Perthel | 5 | 0 | 0 | |
| 25 | DF | (Tunisia) | Adli Lachheb | 2 | 0 | 1 | |
| 26 | MF | (Turkey) | Tanju Öztürk | 5 | 0 | 0 | |
| 28 | MF | (Bosnia and Herzegovina) | Dušan Jevtić | 0 | 0 | 0 | |
| 30 | GK | (Germany) | Marcel Lenz | 0 | 0 | 0 | |
| 31 | DF | (North Macedonia) | Xhelil Abdulla | 0 | 0 | 0 | |
| 33 | MF | (Croatia) | Zvonko Pamić | 0 | 1 | 0 | |
| 34 | MF | (Brazil) | Antônio da Silva | 1 | 0 | 0 | |

Last updated: 19 May 2013
Source: kicker.de
Only competitive matches
(yellow card) = Number of bookings; (second yellow card) = Number of sending offs after a second yellow card; (red card) = Number of sending offs by a direct red card.

=== Current squad ===
Note: Flags indicate national team as defined under FIFA eligibility rules; some limited exceptions apply. Players may hold more than one non-FIFA nationality.

| No. | Pos. | Nation | Player |
|---|---|---|---|
| 1 | GK | PHI | Roland Müller |
| 2 | DF | GER | Julian Koch (vice captain, on loan from Borussia Dortmund) |
| 3 | DF | GER | Markus Bollmann |
| 4 | DF | BIH | Džemal Berberović |
| 5 | DF | BIH | Branimir Bajić (captain) |
| 6 | DF | GER | Benjamin Kern |
| 7 | MF | GER | Daniel Brosinski |
| 8 | FW | GER | Maurice Exslager |
| 9 | FW | BUL | Valeri Domovchiyski |
| 10 | MF | GER | Jürgen Gjasula |
| 11 | FW | SRB | Srđan Baljak |
| 14 | FW | GER | Sören Brandy |
| 15 | MF | SVN | Goran Šukalo (vice captain) |

| No. | Pos. | Nation | Player |
|---|---|---|---|
| 16 | DF | GER | Stephan Hennen |
| 17 | MF | GER | Kevin Wolze |
| 18 | GK | GER | Felix Wiedwald |
| 19 | DF | AUT | Andreas Ibertsberger |
| 21 | MF | GER | Sascha Dum |
| 22 | DF | GER | Dustin Bomheuer |
| 23 | FW | GER | Ranisav Jovanović |
| 24 | DF | GER | Timo Perthel |
| 25 | DF | TUN | Adli Lachheb |
| 26 | MF | GER | Tanju Öztürk |
| 30 | GK | GER | Marcel Lenz |
| 31 | DF | MKD | Xhelil Abdulla |
| 34 | MF | BRA | Antônio da Silva |

=== Transfers ===
==== In ====
| No. | Pos. | Nat. | Name | Age | EU | Moving from | Type | Transfer window | Ends | Transfer fee | Source |
|---|---|---|---|---|---|---|---|---|---|---|---|
| 2 | DF | (Germany) | Julian Koch | 21 | EU | Borussia Dortmund | Loan | Summer | 2013 | Free | |
| 14 | MF | (Germany) | Sören Brandy | 27 | EU | SC Paderborn | Transfer | Summer | 2014 | Free | |
| 23 | FW | (Germany) | Ranisav Jovanović | 23 | EU | Fortuna Düsseldorf (Germany) | Transfer | Summer | 2014 | Free | |
| 24 | DF | (Germany) | Timo Perthel | 23 | EU | Hansa Rostock (Germany) | Transfer | Summer | 2014 | Free | |
| 25 | DF | (Tunisia) | Adli Lachheb | 25 | Non-EU | Erzgebirge Aue (Germany) | Transfer | Summer | 2014 | Free | |
| 31 | DF | (North Macedonia) | Xhelil Abdulla | 20 | Non-EU | De Graafschap (Netherlands) | Transfer | Summer | 2013 | Free | |
| 34 | MF | (Brazil) | Antônio da Silva | 34 | Non-EU | Borussia Dortmund (Germany) | Transfer | Summer | 2013 | Free | |
| 19 | DF | (Austria) | Andreas Ibertsberger | 29 | Non-EU | | Signing | Winter | 2013 | Free | |
| 21 | MF | (Germany) | Sascha Dum | 25 | Non-EU | | Signing | Winter | 2013 | Free | |

==== Out ====
| No. | Pos. | Nat. | Name | Age | EU | Moving to | Type | Transfer window | Transfer fee | Source |
|---|---|---|---|---|---|---|---|---|---|---|
| 2 | DF | (Greece) | Vasileios Pliatsikas | 24 | EU | Schalke 04 | Loan end | Summer | Free | |
| 5 | DF | (Germany) | Daniel Reiche | 24 | EU | SV Babelsberg 03 | Transfer | Summer | Free | |
| 14 | DF | (Brazil) | Bruno Soares | 23 | Non-EU | Fortuna Düsseldorf | Transfer | Summer | Free | |
| 22 | MF | (Hungary) | János Lázok | 27 | EU | Budapest | Release | Summer | Free | |
| 23 | GK | (Germany) | Florian Fromlowitz | 21 | EU | Dynamo Dresden | Release | Summer | Free | |
| 27 | FW | (Romania) | Emil Jula | 32 | EU | Anorthosis Famagusta | Loan | Summer | Free | |
| 33 | FW | (Poland) | Tomasz Zahorski | 27 | EU | Jagiellonia Białystok | Transfer | Summer | Free | |
| 9 | FW | (Norway) | Flamur Kastrati | 21 | EU | Erzgebirge Aue | Transfer | Winter | Free | |
| 15 | MF | (Germany) | André Hoffmann | 19 | EU | Hannover 96 | Transfer | Winter | NA | |
| 20 | MF | (Croatia) | Zvonko Pamić | 21 | EU | Dinamo Zagreb | Transfer | Winter | Free | |

== Coaching staff ==
| Position | Staff |
|---|---|
| Head coach | Kosta Runjaić |
| Sporting director | Ivica Grlić |
| Assistant coaches | Mario Barić |
| Goalkeepers coach | Sven Beuckert |
| Fitness trainer | Karim Rashwan |
| Scout | Dieter Mertens |
| Team Manager | Michael Meier, Tobias Willi |
| Doctors | Bernd Brexendorf, Folker Franzen |
| Physiotherapists | Andreas Bühren, Jens Vergers |
| Equipment managers | Manni Piwonski, Benjamin Hauptmann, Peter Lindner |

Source: msv-duisburg.com
