= 2011 DFB-Pokal final =

- Match programme cover
- Event: 2010–11 DFB-Pokal
MSV Duisburg	Schalke 04
0	5
- Date: 21 May 2011
- Venue: Olympiastadion, Berlin
- Referee: Wolfgang Stark (Ergolding)
- Attendance: 75,708
- Weather: Scattered clouds 22 °C (72 °F); 34% humidity

The 2010–11 DFB-Pokal season came to a close on 21 May 2011 when Duisburg played against Schalke 04 at the Olympiastadion in Berlin. For the first time since 2004, a team from the 2. Bundesliga reached the final.

Schalke 04 won the cup for the fifth time after defeating Duisburg 5–0.

== Route to the final ==
The DFB-Pokal began with 64 teams in a single-elimination knockout cup competition. There were a total of five rounds leading up to the final. Teams were drawn against each other, and the winner after 90 minutes advanced. If still tied, 30 minutes of extra time were played. If the score was still level, a penalty shoot-out was used to determine the winner.

Note: In all results below, the score of the finalist is given first (H: home; A: away).

MSV Duisburg		Round	Schalke 04	
Opponent	Result	2010–11 DFB-Pokal	Opponent	Result
VfB Lübeck (A)	2–0	First round	VfR Aalen (A)	2–1
Hallescher FC (A)	3–0	Second round	FSV Frankfurt (A)	1–0
1. FC Köln (A)	2–1	Round of 16	FC Augsburg (A)	1–0
1. FC Kaiserslautern (A)	2–0	Quarter-finals	1. FC Nürnberg (H)	3–2 (a.e.t.)
Energie Cottbus (H)	2–1	Semi-finals	Bayern Munich (A)	1–0

== Match ==
=== Summary ===
The game started off with both teams neutralizing each other in the midfield area. Schalke had a little edge but could no create any chances for themselves. A few quick passes from the frontline of Schalke confused the defense from Duisburg after 18 minutes and Julian Draxler broke through between two defenders and made the opening goal from 20 metres. Schalke had then control over the game and as Jefferson Farfán made a run on the right side Klaas-Jan Huntelaar was ready for the cross to score the 2–0 just four minutes later. Schalke had a few other chances to raise the lead but after 30 minutes Duisburg got better into the game, and had some chances. The biggest one had Sefa Yılmaz after he had an open lane to the goal but somehow waited too long and the defence recovered and his shot went wide right. Later, Manuel Schäffler had a chance when he had his back to the goal with Christoph Metzelder on his back but his shot had not enough power to go past Manuel Neuer's goal. Schalke was struggling but Benedikt Höwedes scored the third goal two minutes before halftime after a corner kick where David Yelldell misread the ball and was too late. After the half-time, the game was decided when José Manuel Jurado scored the 4–0 after a nice pass from Huntelaar with more than 30 minutes to go. After that goal Schalke 04 controlled the pace of the game and Huntelaar scored his second goal after Ivica Banović from Duisburg passes to Goran Šukalo who lost the ball and Huntelaar scored from 10 metres after 70 minutes. Not much chances afterwards and the game ended in a comfortable 5–0 for Schalke 04 for their fifth title.

=== Details ===
21 May 2011
20:00 CEST

MSV Duisburg	0–5	Schalke 04
	Report	Draxler 18'; Huntelaar 22', 70'; Höwedes 42'; Jurado 55'

Olympiastadion, Berlin
Attendance: 75,708
Referee: Wolfgang Stark (Ergolding)

MSV Duisburg	Schalke 04

GK	18	(United States) David Yelldell
RB	6	(Germany) Benjamin Kern		(substituted off) 77'
CB	5	(Germany) Daniel Reiche		(substituted off) 60'
CB	25	(Bosnia and Herzegovina) Branimir Bajić
LB	28	(France) Olivier Veigneau
DM	15	(Slovenia) Goran Šukalo	(yellow card) 24'
CM	4	(Croatia) Ivica Banović
CM	20	(Bosnia and Herzegovina) Ivica Grlić (c)
RW	32	(Turkey) Sefa Yılmaz
LW	11	(Turkey) Olcay Şahan
CF	22	(Germany) Manuel Schäffler
Substitutes:
GK	1	(Switzerland) Marcel Herzog
DF	17	(Germany) Sven Theißen
DF	21	(Germany) André Hoffmann
MF	10	(Czech Republic) Filip Trojan		(substituted on) 60'
MF	29	(Turkey) Burakcan Kunt
FW	19	(Austria) Stefan Maierhofer
FW	27	(Germany) Maurice Exslager		(substituted on) 77'
Manager:
(Croatia) Milan Šašić

GK	1	(Germany) Manuel Neuer (c)
RB	4	(Germany) Benedikt Höwedes
CB	21	(Germany) Christoph Metzelder
CB	14	(Greece) Kyriakos Papadopoulos
LB	2	(Ghana) Hans Sarpei	(substituted off) 43'
DM	12	(Germany) Peer Kluge	(substituted off) 81'
RM	17	(Peru) Jefferson Farfán
LM	31	(Germany) Julian Draxler	(substituted off) 72'
AM	18	(Spain) José Manuel Jurado
CF	25	(Netherlands) Klaas-Jan Huntelaar
CF	7	(Spain) Raúl
Substitutes:
GK	33	(Germany) Mathias Schober
DF	3	(Spain) Sergio Escudero	(substituted on) 43'
DF	22	(Japan) Atsuto Uchida	(substituted on) 81'
DF	32	(Cameroon) Joël Matip	(substituted on) 72'
MF	11	(Germany) Alexander Baumjohann
FW	9	(Brazil) Edu
FW	19	(Switzerland) Mario Gavranović
Manager:
(Germany) Ralf Rangnick

Assistant referees:
Jan-Hendrik Salver (Stuttgart)
Mike Pickel (Mendig)
Fourth official:
Peter Gagelmann (Bremen)

Match rules

- 90 minutes.
- 30 minutes of extra time if necessary.
- Penalty shoot-out if scores still level.
- Seven named substitutes, of which up to three may be used.
