= Julian Koch =

German footballer (born 1990)

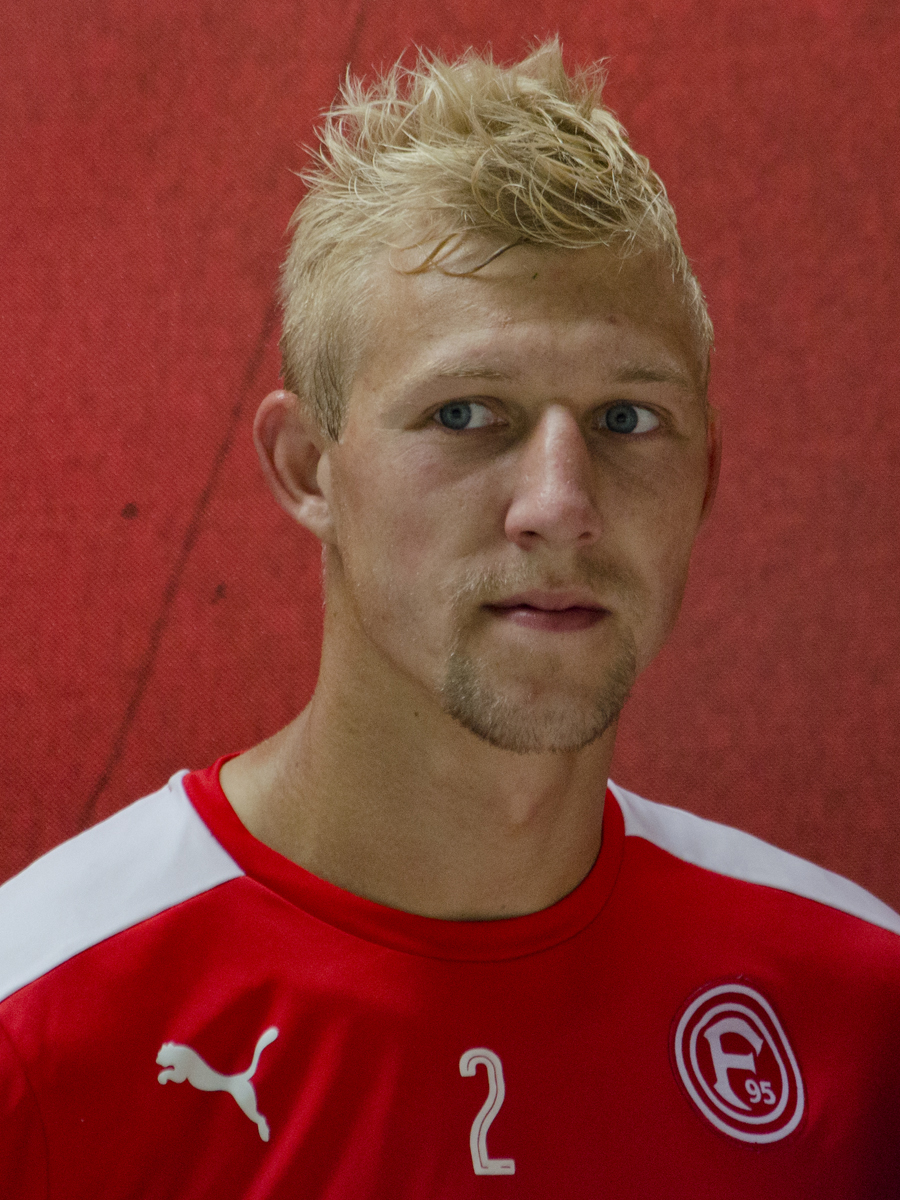
- Koch with Fortuna Düsseldorf in 2016

Personal information
- Date of birth: 11 November 1990 (age 35)
- Place of birth: Schwerte, Germany
- Height: 1.84 m (6 ft 0 in)
- Position: Defensive midfielder

Youth career
- 1994–2001: VfL Hörde
- 2001–2008: Borussia Dortmund

Senior career*
| Years | Team | Apps | (Gls) |
| 2008–2010 | Borussia Dortmund II | 54 | (3) |
| 2009–2013 | Borussia Dortmund | 2 | (0) |
| 2010–2011 | → MSV Duisburg (loan) | 22 | (2) |
| 2012–2013 | → MSV Duisburg (loan) | 22 | (0) |
| 2012– | → MSV Duisburg II (loan) | 1 | (0) |
| 2013–2015 | Mainz 05 | 4 | (0) |
| 2014 | Mainz 05 II | 8 | (0) |
| 2015 | → FC St. Pauli (loan) | 15 | (0) |
| 2015–2017 | Fortuna Düsseldorf | 34 | (0) |
| 2017–2019 | Ferencváros | 16 | (0) |
| Total | | 178 | (5) |

International career
| 2007 | Germany U17 | 1 | (0) |
| 2008 | Germany U18 | 1 | (0) |
| 2009–2010 | Germany U20 | 4 | (0) |
| 2010–2013 | Germany U21 | 2 | (0) |
- * Club domestic league appearances and goals

Julian Koch (born 11 November 1990) is a German former professional footballer who played as a defensive midfielder.

== Personal life ==
He graduated in 2009 his Abitur from the Goethe-Gymnasium Dortmund.

== Club career ==
=== Borussia Dortmund ===
Koch was born in Schwerte and settled 1991 with his family in Dortmund. There he began his career with VfL Hörde. In summer 2001 he left VfL Hörde and signed a youth contract for Borussia Dortmund. After seven years on the youth side for Borussia Dortmund he was promoted to the reserve side in July 2008 and earned his first cap in the Regionalliga West against 1. FSV Mainz 05 II. On 6 March 2010, he made his Bundesliga debut for Borussia Dortmund in a 3–0 win against Borussia Mönchengladbach. On 2 May 2012, despite missing the entire 2011–12 season because of a knee injury, he signed a new two-year contract.

=== MSV Duisburg ===
On 18 May 2010, Koch agreed to a loan deal with MSV Duisburg until the end of the 2010–11 season. Koch sustained a knee injury during a match against Rot-Weiß Oberhausen and missed the rest of the season, including the 2011 DFB-Pokal Final against Schalke 04. On 8 May 2012, it was announced that Koch would rejoin Duisburg on a season-long loan deal effective from 1 July 2012.

=== Mainz 05 ===
On 5 June 2013, Koch completed a transfer to 1. FSV Mainz 05 for an undisclosed fee.

Koch signed with 2. Bundesliga side FC St. Pauli on loan until the end of the 2014–15 season. Whilst on loan, Koch scored a quick goal after intercepting the opposition kick off and blasting the ball into the back of the net.

=== Fortuna Düsseldorf ===
On 5 June 2015, Koch signed for 2. Bundesliga club Fortuna Düsseldorf on a three-year contract.

=== Ferencváros ===
In January 2017 Koch moved to Hungary joining Nemzeti Bajnokság I club Ferencváros. For much of his time there, he was injured. Until his release in summer 2019 he made 22 appearances across all competitions and won the league in 2019 and the cup in 2017.

He retired after being released by Ferencváros.

== International career ==
Koch earned in 2007 his first international cap for the Germany national under-17 team and played 2008 one game for the Germany U18. He made on 13 November 2009 his debut for the Germany U20 in a friendly game against Austria.

== Career statistics ==
Appearances and goals by club, season and competition
| Club | Season | League | | | Cup | | Continental | | Total | | Ref. |
| Club | Season | Division | Apps | Goals | Apps | Goals | Apps | Goals | Apps | Goals | Ref. |
|---|---|---|---|---|---|---|---|---|---|---|---|
| Borussia Dortmund II | 2008–09 | Regionalliga West | 30 | 1 | — | | — | | 30 | 1 | |
| Borussia Dortmund II | 2009–10 | 3. Liga | 24 | 2 | — | | — | | 24 | 2 | |
| Borussia Dortmund II | Total | | 54 | 3 | 0 | 0 | 0 | 0 | 54 | 3 | — |
| Borussia Dortmund | 2009–10 | Bundesliga | 2 | 0 | 0 | 0 | — | | 2 | 0 | |
| MSV Duisburg (loan) | 2010–11 | 2. Bundesliga | 22 | 2 | 4 | 1 | — | | 26 | 3 | |
| MSV Duisburg (loan) | 2012–13 | 2. Bundesliga | 22 | 0 | 0 | 0 | — | | 22 | 0 | |
| MSV Duisburg II (loan) | 2012–13 | Regionalliga West | 1 | 0 | — | | — | | 1 | 0 | |
| Mainz 05 | 2013–14 | Bundesliga | 3 | 0 | 0 | 0 | — | | 3 | 0 | |
| Mainz 05 | 2014–15 | Bundesliga | 1 | 0 | 0 | 0 | — | | 1 | 0 | |
| Mainz 05 | Total | | 4 | 0 | 0 | 0 | 0 | 0 | 4 | 0 | — |
| Mainz 05 II | 2013–14 | Regionalliga Südwest | 7 | 0 | — | | — | | 7 | 0 | |
| Mainz 05 II | 2014–15 | 3. Liga | 1 | 0 | — | | — | | 1 | 0 | |
| Mainz 05 II | Total | | 8 | 0 | 0 | 0 | 0 | 0 | 8 | 0 | — |
| FC St. Pauli (loan) | 2014–15 | 2. Bundesliga | 15 | 0 | 0 | 0 | — | | 15 | 0 | |
| Fortuna Düsseldorf | 2015–16 | 2. Bundesliga | 24 | 0 | 2 | 0 | — | | 26 | 0 | |
| Fortuna Düsseldorf | 2016–17 | 2. Bundesliga | 10 | 0 | 0 | 0 | — | | 10 | 0 | |
| Fortuna Düsseldorf | Total | | 34 | 0 | 2 | 0 | 0 | 0 | 36 | 0 | — |
| Ferencváros | 2016–17 | Nemzeti Bajnokság I | 6 | 0 | 2 | 0 | — | | 8 | 0 | |
| Ferencváros | 2017–18 | Nemzeti Bajnokság I | 9 | 0 | 0 | 0 | 3 | 0 | 12 | 0 | |
| Ferencváros | 2018–19 | Nemzeti Bajnokság I | 1 | 0 | 1 | 0 | 0 | 0 | 2 | 0 | |
| Ferencváros | Total | | 16 | 0 | 3 | 0 | 3 | 0 | 22 | 0 | — |
| Career total | | | 178 | 5 | 7 | 1 | 3 | 0 | 188 | 6 | — |

== Honours ==
Ferencváros

- Nemzeti Bajnokság I: 2018–19
- Magyar Kupa: 2016–17
