= 2004–05 1. FSV Mainz 05 season =

1. FSV Mainz 05
2004–05 season
- Manager: Jürgen Klopp
- Stadium: Bruchwegstadion
- Bundesliga: 11th
- DFB-Pokal: Second round

During the 2004–05 German football season, 1. FSV Mainz 05 competed in the Bundesliga.

== Season summary ==
A first-ever season in Germany's top flight saw Mainz qualify for the next season's Bundesliga with an 11th-placed finish. Furthermore, the team were awarded Germany's fair play award - because Germany were awarded an extra spot in the UEFA Cup through the Fair Play draw, Mainz qualified for the UEFA Cup's first round.

== First-team squad ==
Squad at end of season

Note: Flags indicate national team as defined under FIFA eligibility rules; some limited exceptions apply. Players may hold more than one non-FIFA nationality.

No.	Pos.	Nation	Player
1	GK	GER	Dimo Wache
2	DF	SUI	Marco Walker
3	MF	GER	Michael Falkenmayer
4	DF	MKD	Nikolče Noveski
6	MF	GER	Hanno Balitsch
7	FW	GER	Benjamin Auer
8	MF	GER	Fabian Gerber
9	MF	GER	Dennis Weiland
10	DF	GER	Manuel Friedrich
14	MF	GER	Jürgen Kramny
15	FW	GER	Christoph Teinert
16	FW	GER	Claudius Weber (Note: Weber was born in Opole, Poland, but also qualified to represent Germany internationally and represented them at U-20 level.)
17	DF	GER	Marco Rose
18	DF	CRO	Robert Nikolic
19	MF	GER	Christof Babatz

No.	Pos.	Nation	Player
20	FW	SCG	Ranisav Jovanović
21	FW	USA	Conor Casey
22	FW	GER	Niclas Weiland
23	GK	GER	Sven Hoffmeister
24	DF	GER	Benjamin Weigelt
25	MF	BRA	Antônio da Silva
26	DF	HUN	Tamás Bódog
27	FW	GER	Michael Thurk
28	DF	GER	Mathias Abel
29	GK	GER	Christian Wetklo
31	DF	TUR	Christian Demirtaş
34	DF	GER	Christophe Ihm
37	DF	TUR	Murat Doymus
43	MF	GER	Dennis Probst

=== Left club during season ===
Note: Flags indicate national team as defined under FIFA eligibility rules; some limited exceptions apply. Players may hold more than one non-FIFA nationality.

No.	Pos.	Nation	Player
5	DF	KAZ	Peter Neustädter (demoted to second team)
11	FW	GER	Markus Dworrak (to RW Erfurt)

No.	Pos.	Nation	Player
33	MF	GER	Mimoun Azaouagh (to Schalke 04 (Note: Azaouagh was born in Beni Sidel, Morocco, but also qualified to represent Germany internationally and represented them at U-21 level.))
