= Hennen =

Hennen is an Irish surname. Notable people with the surname include:

- Bernhard Hennen (born 1966), German writer
- Brad Hennen, American politician
- Pat Hennen (born 1953), American motorcycle road racer
- Stephan Hennen (born 1990), German footballer
- Thomas J. Hennen (astronaut) (born 1952), United States Army warrant officer and astronaut
- Thomas J. Hennen (bishop) (born 1978), American Catholic priest who is Bishop-elect of the Diocese of Baker
