= Chris Swedzinski =

American politician

Member of the Minnesota House of Representatives from the 15A district 21A (2011–2013), 16A (2013-2022)
- Incumbent
- Assumed office January 4, 2011
- Preceded by: Marty Seifert
- Succeeded by: Brad Hennen (elect)

Personal details
- Born: May 10, 1978 (age 48)
- Party: Republican Party of Minnesota
- Spouse: Jessica
- Children: 5
- Education: Ridgewater College; Minnesota State University
- Occupation: farmer, legislator

Chris Swedzinski (/swəzɪnski/; born May 10, 1978) is an American politician serving in the Minnesota House of Representatives since 2011. A member of the Republican Party of Minnesota, Swedzinski represents District 15A in southwest Minnesota, which includes the city of Marshall, the counties of Lac qui Parle, Lyon and Yellow Medicine, and parts of Chippewa County.

== Early education and career ==
Swedzinski graduated from Minneota High School in Minneota, then went on to Ridgewater College in Willmar and Minnesota State University in Mankato, earning his B.S. in history and political science. He served as a district representative for former U.S. Representative Mark Kennedy for five years, and also worked as a Rural Development Specialist for the United States Department of Agriculture, designing and facilitating outreach plans and strategies for rural businesses and renewable energy efforts. He and his family live and farm near Ghent.

== Minnesota House of Representatives ==
Swedzinski was elected to the Minnesota House of Representatives in 2010, succeeding Marty Seifert, who did not seek reelection, and has been reelected every two years since. He ran on a platform of cutting taxes, reducing the size of government, and empowering the individual.

Swedzinski was an assistant majority leader during the 2015-16 legislative session, and chaired the Subcommittee on Mining, Forestry, & Tourism, a subcommittee of the Environment & Natural Resources Policy and Finance Committee, in 2017-18. He is the minority lead on the Climate and Energy Finance and Policy Committee and sits on the Taxes Committee.

== Electoral history ==
2010 Minnesota State House - District 21A
Party	Candidate	Votes	%
Republican	Chris Swedzinski	8,245	63.55
Democratic (DFL)	Ramona Larson	4,721	36.39
Write-in		9	0.07
Total votes		12,975	100.0
Republican hold			

2012 Minnesota State House - District 16A
Party	Candidate	Votes	%
Republican	Chris Swedzinski	10,991	56.72
Democratic (DFL)	Al Kruse	8,363	43.16
Write-in		22	0.11
Total votes		19,376	100.0
Republican hold			

2014 Minnesota State House - District 16A
Party	Candidate	Votes	%
Republican	Chris Swedzinski	8,642	61.72
Democratic (DFL)	Laurie Driessen	5,355	38.24
Write-in		5	0.04
Total votes		13,984	100.0
Republican hold			

2016 Minnesota State House - District 16A
Party	Candidate	Votes	%
Republican	Chris Swedzinski	13,048	68.10
Democratic (DFL)	Al Kruse	6,096	31.81
Write-in		17	0.09
Total votes		19,161	100.0
Republican hold			

2018 Minnesota State House - District 16A
Party	Candidate	Votes	%
Republican	Chris Swedzinski	10,854	67.56
Democratic (DFL)	Tom Wyatt-Yerka	5,198	32.36
Write-in		13	0.08
Total votes		16,065	100.0
Republican hold			

2020 Minnesota State House - District 16A
Party	Candidate	Votes	%
Republican	Chris Swedzinski	13,930	69.15
Democratic (DFL)	Doria Drost	6,200	30.78
Write-in		16	0.08
Total votes		20,146	100.0
Republican hold			

2022 Minnesota State House - District 15A
Party	Candidate	Votes	%
Republican	Chris Swedzinski	12,446	70.39
Democratic (DFL)	Keith VanOverbeke	5,225	29.55
Write-in		11	0.06
Total votes		17,682	100.0
Republican hold			
