= Ranisav Jovanović =

German footballer (born 1980)

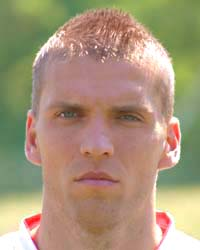

Personal information
- Full name: Ranisav Jovanović
- Date of birth: 5 November 1980 (age 46)
- Place of birth: West Berlin, West Germany
- Height: 1.91 m (6 ft 3 in)
- Position: Striker

Youth career
- 1987–1998: Spandauer SV
- 1998–2000: Tasmania Gropiusstadt

Senior career*
Years	Team	Apps	(Gls)
2000–2002	Tennis Borussia Berlin	32	(13)
2002–2004	Dynamo Dresden	61	(14)
2004–2008	1. FSV Mainz 05	57	(2)
2004–2005	1. FSV Mainz 05 II	5	(2)
2006	→ LR Ahlen (loan)	17	(3)
2008–2012	Fortuna Düsseldorf	86	(19)
2011–2012	Fortuna Düsseldorf II	3	(2)
2012–2013	MSV Duisburg	26	(4)
2013–2016	SV Sandhausen	58	(13)
2016–2017	FSV Frankfurt	20	(0)
- * Club domestic league appearances and goals as of 26 August 2017

Ranisav Jovanović (Serbian Cyrillic: Ранисав Јовановић; born 5 November 1980) is a German footballer.

== Career ==
He was in the news in mid-August 2009 when he got into a fight with Fortuna teammate Robert Palikuća at a training session. The fight ended with Jovanović pushing Palikuća to the ground and choking him before they got separated by teammates.

In July 2013, he moved from MSV Duisburg to SV Sandhausen.

== Career statistics ==
As of matches played on 13 February 2018.

Club	Season	League			Cup		Other^{1}		Total		Ref.
Club	Season	Division	Apps	Goals	Apps	Goals	Apps	Goals	Apps	Goals	Ref.
Tennis Borussia Berlin	2000–01	Regionalliga Nord	2	3	0	0	—		2	3	
Tennis Borussia Berlin	2001–02	Oberliga Nord	30	10	—		—		30	10	
Tennis Borussia Berlin	Totals		32	13	0	0	—		32	13	—
Dynamo Dresden	2002–03	Regionalliga Nord	28	7	—		—		28	7	
Dynamo Dresden	2003–04	Regionalliga Nord	33	7	1	0	—		34	7	
Dynamo Dresden	Totals		61	14	1	0	—		62	7	—
Mainz	2004–05	Bundesliga	16	0	0	0	—		16	0	
Mainz	2005–06	Bundesliga	2	0	0	0	1	0	3	0	
Mainz	2006–07	Bundesliga	26	2	1	0	—		27	2	
Mainz	2007–08	2. Bundesliga	13	0	1	0	—		14	0	
Mainz	2008–09	2. Bundesliga	0	0	1	0	—		1	0	
Mainz	Totals		57	2	3	0	1	0	61	2	—
Mainz II	2004–05	Regionalliga Süd	5	2	—		—		5	2	
Mainz II	2005–06	Regionalliga Süd	0	0	1	0	—		1	0	
Mainz II	Totals		5	2	1	0	—		6	2	—
LR Ahlen (loan)	2005–06	2. Bundesliga	17	3	0	0	—		17	3	
Fortuna Düsseldorf	2008–09	3. Liga	29	8	0	0	—		29	8	
Fortuna Düsseldorf	2009–10	2. Bundesliga	22	7	1	0	—		23	7	
Fortuna Düsseldorf	2010–11	2. Bundesliga	18	0	1	0	—		19	0	
Fortuna Düsseldorf	2011–12	2. Bundesliga	17	4	1	0	2	1	20	5	
Fortuna Düsseldorf	Totals		103	22	3	0	2	1	108	23	—
Fortuna Düsseldorf II	2011–12	Regionalliga West	3	2	—		—		3	2	
Duisburg	2012–13	2. Bundesliga	26	4	1	0	—		27	4	
Sandhausen	2013–14	2. Bundesliga	25	6	2	2	—		27	8	
Sandhausen	2014–15	2. Bundesliga	9	1	0	0	—		9	1	
Sandhausen	2015–16	2. Bundesliga	24	6	0	0	—		24	6	
Sandhausen	Totals		58	13	2	2	—		60	15	—
FSV Frankfurt	2016–17	3. Liga	20	0	1	0	—		21	0	
Career totals			382	75	11	2	3	1	396	78	—

- 1.Includes UEFA Cup and Promotion playoff.
