= Joachim Hopp =

German footballer

Personal information
- Date of birth: 10 July 1966 (age 60)
- Place of birth: Duisburg, West Germany
- Height: 1.81 m (5 ft 11 in)
- Position: Defender

Senior career*
Years	Team	Apps	(Gls)
–1989	VfvB Ruhrort-Laar		
1989–1993	MSV Duisburg II		
1990–1998	MSV Duisburg	132	(4)
1998–1999	Rot-Weiß Oberhausen	28	(1)
1999–2000	KFC Uerdingen 05	35	(1)
2003	Borussia Wuppertal		

Managerial career
- 2000–2001: MSV Duisburg (assistant)
- 2005–2007: Wuppertaler SV II
- 2007–2008: Wuppertaler SV (assistant)
- 2008–2010: Bonner SC (assistant)
- 2012–2013: 1. FC Wülfrath
- 2013–2014: SF Hamborn 07
- * Club domestic league appearances and goals

Joachim Hopp (born 10 July 1966) is a German former professional footballer who played as a defender.
