= Sven Theißen =

German footballer

Personal information
- Full name: Sven Theißen
- Date of birth: 24 October 1988 (age 38)
- Place of birth: Duisburg, West Germany
- Height: 1.87 m (6 ft 2 in)
- Position: Defender

Youth career
- 1995–2007: MSV Duisburg

Senior career*
Years	Team	Apps	(Gls)
2007–2011	MSV Duisburg II	101	(3)
2009–2011	MSV Duisburg	6	(0)
2011–2012	SC Fortuna Köln	14	(0)
2012–2015	VfB Lübeck	49	(5)
- * Club domestic league appearances and goals as of 1 July 2015

Sven Theißen (born 24 October 1988) is a retired German footballer. Since 2015, he works in marketing for VfB Lübeck.

Theißen made his full debut on 22 November 2009 in a 2. Bundesliga match for MSV Duisburg against SpVgg Greuther Fürth.
