= Felix Wiedwald =

German footballer

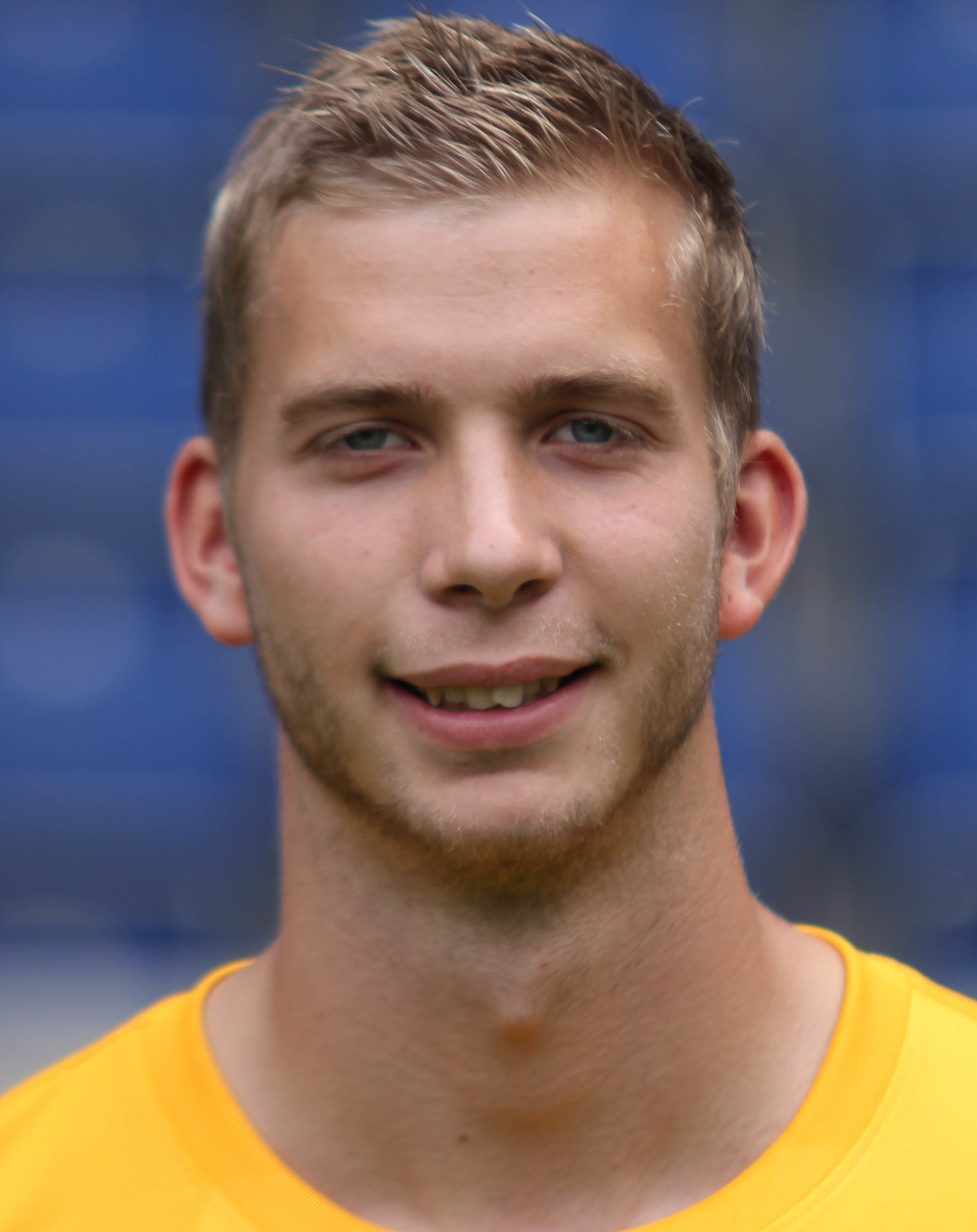
- Wiedwald with MSV Duisburg in 2012

Personal information
- Full name: Felix Wiedwald
- Date of birth: 15 March 1990 (age 36)
- Place of birth: Thedinghausen, West Germany
- Height: 1.90 m (6 ft 3 in)
- Position: Goalkeeper

Youth career
- 1997–1999: TSV Achim
- 1999–2009: Werder Bremen

Senior career*
Years	Team	Apps	(Gls)
2009–2011	Werder Bremen II	39	(0)
2009–2011	Werder Bremen	0	(0)
2011–2013	MSV Duisburg	47	(0)
2013–2015	Eintracht Frankfurt	11	(0)
2013	Eintracht Frankfurt II	1	(0)
2015–2017	Werder Bremen	59	(0)
2017–2018	Leeds United	28	(0)
2018–2020	Eintracht Frankfurt	3	(0)
2019	→ MSV Duisburg (loan)	15	(0)
2020–2021	FC Emmen	6	(0)
2022	SV Sandhausen	0	(0)
Total		209	(0)

International career
2009	Germany U20	1	(0)
- * Club domestic league appearances and goals

Felix Wiedwald (German pronunciation: [ˈfeːlɪks ˈviːtˌvalt]; born 15 March 1990) is a German former professional footballer who played as a goalkeeper. A Werder Bremen youth product, he played for the club's reserves in the 3. Liga before moving to 2. Bundesliga club MSV Duisburg in 2011. Following a two-year stint at Bundesliga side Eintracht Frankfurt he returned to Werder Bremen in 2015. Upon Jiří Pavlenka's arrival in 2017, he moved to Championship club Leeds United where he spent one season before rejoining Eintracht Frankfurt. At Eintracht Frankfurt he featured sparingly and was loaned out to former club MSV Duisburg. He retired after stints with Dutch club FC Emmen in the Eredivisie and with 2. Bundesliga side SV Sandhausen. At international level, he made one appearance for the Germany U20 national team.

== Club career ==
=== Early career ===
After progressing through the academy of TSV Achim and subsequently Werder Bremen, Wiedwald made his debut for Werder Bremen II in the 2–2 away game at FC Carl Zeiss Jena in the 3. Liga on 26 September 2009. He became Werder Bremen II's first-choice goalkeeper.

=== MSV Duisburg ===
After joining Duisburg initially as number 2 goalkeeper to Florian Fromlowitz, Wiedwald played his first 2. Bundesliga match for MSV Duisburg on 18 November 2011 in a 3–0 home win against Eintracht Braunschweig.

=== Eintracht Frankfurt ===
In the summer of 2013, Wiedwald joined Bundesliga club Eintracht Frankfurt, where he became the number two goalkeeper to regular goalkeeper Kevin Trapp. On 12 December 2013, he made his debut for Eintracht Frankfurt in the UEFA Europa League match against Apoel Nicosia.

Wiedwald made his debut in the Bundesliga on 2 February 2014, when he came on in the game against Bayern Munich for the injured Kevin Trapp. In September 2014, he held off competition from experienced former German international goalkeeper Timo Hildebrand to be the club's temporary first choice goalkeeper after an injury to regular number one Kevin Trapp.

=== Werder Bremen ===
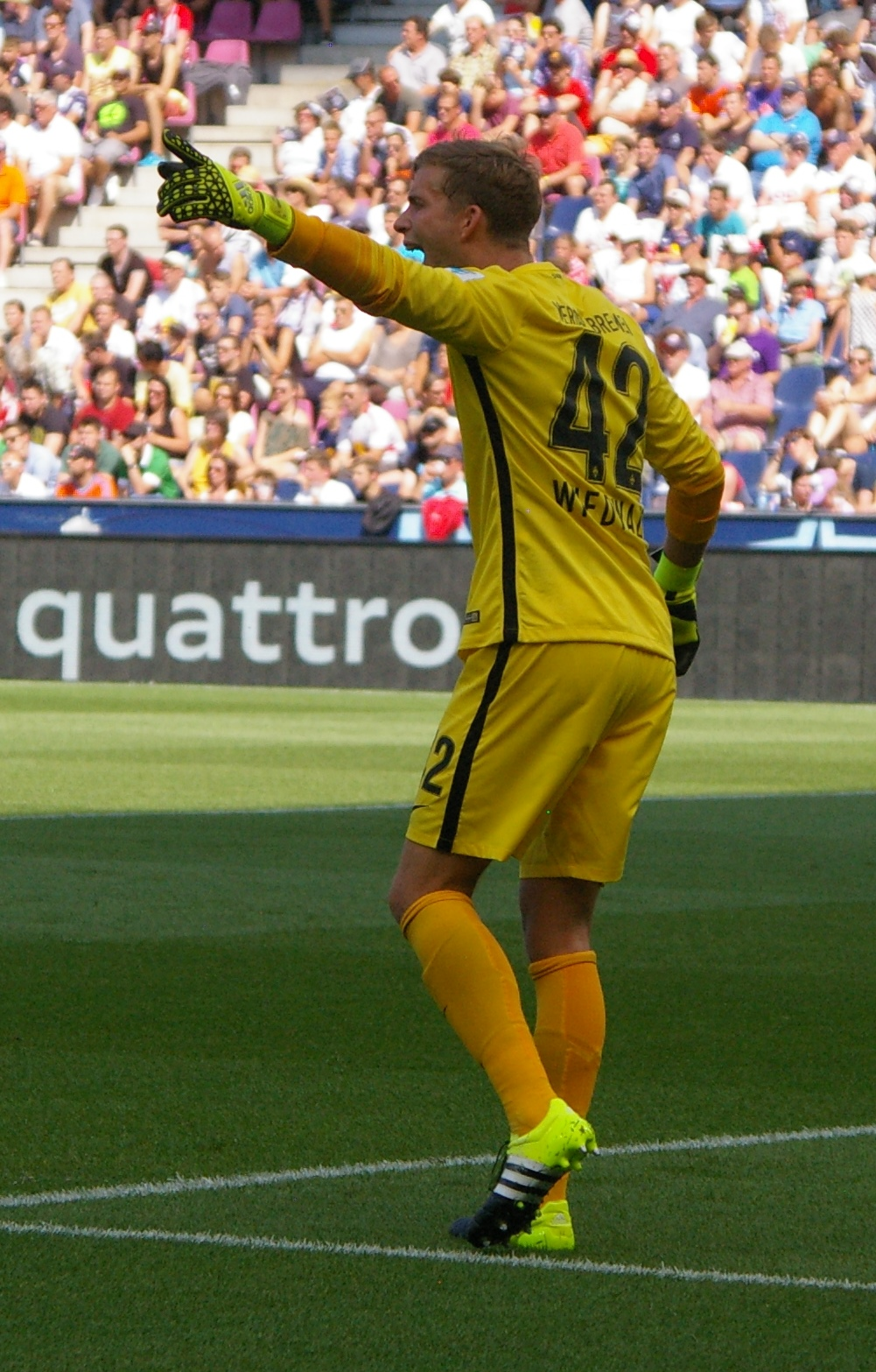
Wiedwald playing for Werder Bremen in 2015

On 26 May 2015, Werder Bremen announced their signing of Wiedwald as he returned to his childhood club after spending four years at other clubs. While Raphael Wolf, his main competitor, struggled with injuries Wiedwald went into the 2015–16 season as Werder's first choice goalkeeper.

At the beginning of the 2016–17 season, Wiedwald shared the number one position with Jaroslav Drobny, however established himself in the second half of the season, with Wiedwald starting 26 games for Bremen over the season as they finished 8th in the Bundesliga. After impressing during the latter half of the season and reaching a clause after playing 20+ games, on 11 May 2017, Wiedwald's contract at the club was automatically extended.

After Bremen signed goalkeeper Jiří Pavlenka on 27 June 2017 as the new number one goalkeeper for the 2017–18 season, Wiedwald was subject of enquiries from Ligue 1 club FC Nantes and Championship club Leeds United.

=== Leeds United ===
On 30 June 2017, Wiedwald signed for Leeds United of the Championship on a three-year deal contract an undisclosed fee. On 6 August 2017, the first matchday of the 2017–18 season, he made his Leeds United debut in the 3–2 victory against Bolton Wanderers. In the following four league matches on 12, 15, 19 and 26 August he kept four successive clean sheets – in two 0–0 draws against Preston North End and Fulham, in a 2–0 victory against Sunderland and a 2–0 victory against Nottingham Forest on 26 August.

After receiving criticism for his performance against Sheffield Wednesday, Wiedwald lost his place in the side to Andy Lonergan. However, with Lonergan having several games as number 1 and failing to impress, Wiedwald returned to the side against Barnsley on 25 November keeping a clean sheet. During the game, a quick thinking Leeds fan from the crowd gave him his cap when he noticed that the sun was interfering with his vision. After the game, Wiedwald gave the fan his cap back and also his shirt as a thank you gift. He made an error on 9 December against Queens Park Rangers when he let Paweł Wszołek's hopeful tame long ball bounce into the net.

He kept his 10th clean sheet of the season in his 19th performance on 1 January 2018 in Leeds 0–0 draw against Nottingham Forest. He received the man of the match award for Leeds, after keeping another clean sheet in Leeds 0–0 draw against Hull City on 31 January.

After an early error against Bristol City that led to a goal, Wiedwald was criticised both by fans and by former Leeds and England goalkeeper Paul Robinson, acting as Sky Sports' pundit, who said he thought Leeds needed another goalkeeper.

On 24 February 2018, he helped prove to be a match winner in Leeds' 1–0 win against Brentford, when he made a save from Brentford's John Egan. On 2 March, Wiedwald again came under criticism in a 3–0 defeat against Middlesbrough after a series of errors in the game including letting a Patrick Bamford shot squirm past him to score Boro's second goal of the game. On 7 March, he was dropped due to his form, with youngster Bailey Peacock-Farrell preferred in goal against league leaders Wolverhampton Wanderers. Leeds lost 3–0 but Peacock-Farrell received man of the match for his display.

=== Eintracht Frankfurt ===
Wiedwald re-signed for Bundesliga club Eintracht Frankfurt on 19 June 2018 on a three-year contract for an undisclosed fee. He joined MSV Duisburg on 2 January 2019 on loan until the end of the 2018–19 season.

=== FC Emmen ===
Wiedwald moved to Eredivisie side FC Emmen on 5 October 2020, the last day of the 2020 summer transfer window. He signed a one-year contract with the option of a second year.

=== SV Sandhausen ===
In January 2022, after half a year without a club, Wiedwald signed a contract until the end of the 2021–22 season with 2. Bundesliga club SV Sandhausen. He joined as a replacement for the injured Nikolai Rehnen.

=== Retirement ===
Wiedwald announced his retirement in September 2022.

== International career ==
On 13 November 2009, Wiedwald made his debut for the Germany U20 national team against Austria U20.

== Career statistics ==
Appearances and goals by club, season and competition
Club	Season	League			National cup (Note: Appearance in DFB-Pokal)		League cup (Note: Appearance in EFL Cup)		Europe		Total	
Club	Season	Division	Apps	Goals	Apps	Goals	Apps	Goals	Apps	Goals	Apps	Goals
Werder Bremen II	2009–10	3. Liga	15	0	—		—		—		15	0
Werder Bremen II	2010–11	3. Liga	24	0	—		—		—		24	0
Werder Bremen II	Total		39	0	—		—		—		39	0
Werder Bremen	2009–10	Bundesliga	0	0	0	0	—		—		0	0
Werder Bremen	2010–11	Bundesliga	0	0	0	0	—		0	0	0	0
Werder Bremen	Total		0	0	0	0	—		0	0	0	0
MSV Duisburg	2011–12	2. Bundesliga	20	0	0	0	—		—		20	0
MSV Duisburg	2012–13	2. Bundesliga	27	0	2	0	—		—		29	0
MSV Duisburg	Total		47	0	2	0	—		—		49	0
Eintracht Frankfurt	2013–14	Bundesliga	1	0	0	0	—		1 (Note: Appearance in UEFA Europa League)	0	2	0
Eintracht Frankfurt	2014–15	Bundesliga	10	0	1	0	—		—		11	0
Eintracht Frankfurt	Total		11	0	1	0	—		1	0	13	0
Eintracht Frankfurt II	2013–14	Regionalliga Südwest	1	0	—		—		—		1	0
Werder Bremen	2015–16	Bundesliga	34	0	5	0	—		—		39	0
Werder Bremen	2016–17	Bundesliga	25	0	1	0	—		—		26	0
Werder Bremen	Total		59	0	6	0	—		—		65	0
Leeds United	2017–18	Championship	28	0	0	0	2	0	—		30	0
Eintracht Frankfurt	2018–19	Bundesliga	0	0	0	0	—		—		0	0
Eintracht Frankfurt	2019–20	Bundesliga	3	0	0	0	—		3	0	6	0
Eintracht Frankfurt	Total		3	0	0	0	—		3	0	6	0
MSV Duisburg (loan)	2018–19	2. Bundesliga	15	0	1	0	—		—		16	0
FC Emmen	2020–21	Eredivisie	6	0	1	0	—		—		7	0
Career total			209	0	11	0	2	0	4	0	226	0
