= Christopher Mandiangu =

German footballer

Personal information
- Full name: Christopher-Massamba Mandiangu
- Date of birth: 8 February 1992 (age 34)
- Place of birth: Kinshasa, Zaire
- Height: 1.73 m (5 ft 8 in)
- Position: Forward

Youth career
- Polizei SV
- 2002–2011: Borussia Mönchengladbach

Senior career*
Years	Team	Apps	(Gls)
2011–2012	Borussia Mönchengladbach II	5	(0)
2012–2013	MSV Duisburg II	26	(1)
2013–2014	TSG Neustrelitz	20	(1)
2014–2015	Dynamo Berliner	9	(1)
2015	FC Eindhoven	12	(2)
2016	Hamilton Academical	0	(0)
2016	Žilina	4	(0)
2016	MŠK Žilina II	14	(3)
2017	Blau-Weiß Linz	8	(0)
2017	Gandzasar Kapan	2	(0)
2017	Hapoel Kfar Saba	7	(0)
2018	Jaro	23	(8)
2018–2019	Septemvri Sofia	12	(5)
2019–2020	Widzew Łódź	25	(4)
2020	Vllaznia Shkodër	0	(0)

International career
- Germany U15
- Germany U18
- * Club domestic league appearances and goals as of 15:01, 5 September 2020 (UTC)

Christopher-Massamba Mandiangu (born 8 February 1992) is a German professional footballer who plays as a forward.

== Early and personal life ==
Mandiangu was born in Kinshasa, Zaire; his family emigrated to Mönchengladbach in Germany shortly after his birth.

== Club career ==
Mandiangu began his career with Polizei SV before moving to the youth team of Borussia Mönchengladbach in 2002. In July 2007, he moved out of his family's home and into the Borussia Mönchengladbach boarding school.

Mandiangu spent his early senior career with Borussia Mönchengladbach II, MSV Duisburg II and TSG Neustrelitz. He moved to Berliner FC Dynamo in May 2014. He left the club by mutual consent in March 2015, and then signed for Dutch club FC Eindhoven on an amateur basis.

In December 2015, it was announced that Mandiangu would sign for Scottish club Hamilton Academical. After training with the club for three weeks, the deal completed in January 2016, with the contract running until the end of the 2015–16 season. In May 2016, it was announced that he would leave Hamilton at the end of the 2015–16 season.

In May 2016, Mandiangu signed with Slovak club MŠK Žilina on a two-year contract. He moved to Austrian club Blau-Weiß Linz in January 2017. Six-months later, Mandiangu joined Gandzasar Kapan.

On 1 September 2017 signed to Hapoel Kfar Saba.

Kokkolan PV announced on 10 December 2018, that they had signed Mandiangu for the 2019 season.

In August 2020 he signed for Albanian club Vllaznia Shkodër.

== International career ==
Mandiangu represented Germany at under-15, and under-18 youth levels, making a total of 22 youth international appearances.

== Career statistics ==
As of 11 June 2024

Appearances and goals by club, season and competition
Club	Season	League			National Cup		League Cup		Other		Total	
Club	Season	Division	Apps	Goals	Apps	Goals	Apps	Goals	Apps	Goals	Apps	Goals
Borussia Mönchengladbach II	2011–12	Regionalliga	5	0	0	0	0	0	0	0	5	0
MSV Duisburg II	2012–13	Regionalliga	26	1	0	0	0	0	0	0	26	1
TSG Neustrelitz	2013–14	Regionalliga	20	1	0	0	0	0	0	0	20	1
Berliner FC Dynamo	2014–15	Regionalliga	9	1	0	0	0	0	0	0	9	1
FC Eindhoven	2015–16	Eerste Divisie	12	2	1	0	0	0	0	0	13	2
Hamilton Academical	2015–16	Scottish Premiership	0	0	1	0	0	0	0	0	1	0
Žilina	2016–17	Slovak Super Liga	4	0	0	0	0	0	0	0	4	0
Žilina II	2016–17	2. Liga Slovakia	14	3	0	0	0	0	0	0	14	3
Blau-Weiß Linz	2016–17	Austrian First League	8	0	0	0	0	0	0	0	8	0
Gandzasar Kapan	2017–18	Armenian Premier League	2	0	0	0	—		2	0	4	0
Hapoel Kfar Saba	2017–18	Liga Leumit	7	0	—		—		—		7	0
Jaro	2018	Ykkönen	23	8	3	1	—		—		26	9
PFC Septemvri Sofia	2018–19	Bulgarian First League	15	6	2	0	—		—		17	6
Widzew Łódź	2019–20	II liga	25	4	2	0	—		—		27	4
Vllaznia Shkodër	2020–21	Kategoria Superiore	0	0	1	1	—		—		1	1
Career total			170	26	10	2	0	0	2	0	191	36
