= 2013–14 1. FSV Mainz 05 season =

1. FSV Mainz 05
2013–14 season
- Manager: Thomas Tuchel
- Stadium: Opel Arena
- Bundesliga: 7th
- DFB-Pokal: Second round
- Top goalscorer: League: Shinji Okazaki (15); All: Shinji Okazaki (15)
- Biggest win: Mainz 4–2 Hoffenheim
- Biggest defeat: Hannover 4–1 Mainz; Leverkusen 4–1 Mainz; Bayern 4–1 Mainz
Home colours	Away colours	Third colours

The 2013–14 season was the 109th season of competitive association football played by 1. Fußball- und Sportverein Mainz 05, a professional football club based in Mainz, Rhineland-Palatinate, Germany. The club's 13th-placed finish in 2012–13 meant the club would again compete in the Bundesliga, alongside the DFB-Pokal. The 2013–14 season ran from 1 July 2013 to 30 June 2014.

The club finished 7th in the Bundesliga, securing qualification for the following season's UEFA Europa League qualification rounds. Manager Thomas Tuchel left the club at the end of the season.

== Competitions ==
=== Bundesliga ===
==== League table ====
Pos	Team	Pld	W	D	L	GF	GA	GD	Pts	Qualification or relegation
5	VfL Wolfsburg	34	18	6	10	63	50	+13	60	Qualification for the Europa League group stage (Note: The 2013–14 DFB-Pokal finalists (Borussia Dortmund and Bayern Munich) qualified for the UEFA Champions League, thus the three Europa League places were distributed through league positions.)
6	Borussia Mönchengladbach	34	16	7	11	59	43	+16	55	Qualification for the Europa League play-off round
7	Mainz 05	34	16	5	13	52	54	−2	53	Qualification for the Europa League third qualifying round
8	FC Augsburg	34	15	7	12	47	47	0	52	
9	1899 Hoffenheim	34	11	11	12	72	70	+2	44	

Source: DFB
Rules for classification: 1) points; 2) goal difference; 3) number of goals scored.

==== Results summary ====
Overall								Home						Away					
Pld	W	D	L	GF	GA	GD	Pts	W	D	L	GF	GA	GD	W	D	L	GF	GA	GD
34	16	5	13	52	54	−2	53	10	3	4	28	17	+11	6	2	9	24	37	−13

Last updated: 17 April 2020.

==== Matches ====
Bundesliga match details
Round	Date	Time	Opponents	Venue	Result F–A	Scorers	Attendance	League position	Ref.
1	11 August 2013	15:30	VfB Stuttgart	H	3–2	Müller 14', 78', Okazaki 65'	30,279	6th	
2	17 August 2013	15:30	SC Freiburg	A	2–1	Zimling 64', Müller 68'	23,100	4th	
3	24 August 2013	15:30	VfL Wolfsburg	H	2–0	Choupo-Moting 61', Müller 78'	27,103	4th	
4	31 August 2013	15:30	Hannover 96	A	1–4	Müller 12'	38,600	5th	
5	14 September 2013	15:30	Schalke 04	H	0–1		34,000	5th	
6	21 September 2013	15:30	Bayer Leverkusen	H	1–4	Mallı 82'	28,617	7th	
7	28 September 2013	15:30	Hertha BSC	A	1–3	Müller 8'	40,969	12th	
8	5 October 2013	15:30	1899 Hoffenheim	H	2–2	Choupo-Moting 82', Mallı 90+2	25,187	11th	
9	19 October 2013	15:30	Bayern Munich	A	1–4	Parker 44'	71,000	14th	
10	26 October 2013	15:30	Eintracht Braunschweig	H	2–0	Okazaki 8', 68'	30,657	11th	
11	3 November 2013	15:30	FC Augsburg	A	1–2	Choupo-Moting 59' pen.	28,007	12th	
12	10 November 2013	15:30	Eintracht Frankfurt	H	1–0	Choupo-Moting 88'	34,000	9th	
13	24 November 2013	17:30	Werder Bremen	A	3–2	Müller 7', Okazaki 17', 70'	38,429	7th	
14	30 November 2013	15:30	Borussia Dortmund	H	1–3	Choupo-Moting 74' pen.	34,000	8th	
15	6 December 2013	20:30	1. FC Nürnberg	A	1–1	Okazaki 75'	31,084	8th	
16	14 December 2013	15:30	Borussia Mönchengladbach	H	0–0		34,000	9th	
17	21 December 2013	15:30	Hamburger SV	A	3–2	Okazaki 47', 90+2', Müller 50'	50,918	9th	
18	25 January 2014	15:30	VfB Stuttgart	A	2–1	Okazaki 40', Saller 87'	38,000	8th	
19	1 February 2014	15:30	SC Freiburg	H	2–0	Park 24', Koo 86'	27,247	7th	
20	8 February 2014	15:30	VfL Wolfsburg	A	0–3		23,520	9th	
21	14 February 2014	20:30	Hannover 96	H	2–0	Mallı 51', Choupo-Moting 90+3'	26,754	7th	
22	21 February 2014	20:30	Schalke 04	A	0–0		60,952	9th	
23	1 March 2014	15:30	Bayer Leverkusen	A	1–0			6th	
24	9 March 2014	17:30	Hertha BSC	H	1–1			7th	
25	15 March 2014	15:30	1899 Hoffenheim	A	4–2			5th	
26	22 March 2014	15:30	Bayern Munich	H	0–2			7th	
27	25 March 2014	20:00	Eintracht Braunschweig	A	1–3			7th	
28	29 March 2014	15:30	FC Augsburg	H	3–0			7th	
29	5 April 2014	15:30	Eintracht Frankfurt	A	0–2			7th	
30	12 April 2014	15:30	Werder Bremen	H	3–0			7th	
31	19 April 2014	15:30	Borussia Dortmund	A	2–4			7th	
32	26 April 2014	15:30	1. FC Nürnberg	H	2–0			7th	
33	3 May 2014	15:30	Borussia Mönchengladbach	A	1–3	Choupo-Moting 65'	54,010	7th	
34	10 May 2014	15:30	Hamburger SV	H	3–2	Soto 7', Mallı 65', Okazaki 82'	34,000	7th	

=== DFB-Pokal ===
DFB-Pokal match details
Round	Date	Time	Opponents	Venue	Result F–A	Scorers	Attendance	Ref.
First round	3 August 2013	15:30	Fortuna Köln	A	2–1	Müller 14', Choupo-Moting 87'	6,712	
Second round	24 September 2013	20:30	1. FC Köln	H	0–1		22,782	

== Player statistics ==
=== Appearances and goals ===
No.	Pos	Nat	Player	Total		Bundesliga		DFB-Pokal	
No.	Pos	Nat	Player	Apps	Goals	Apps	Goals	Apps	Goals
2	DF	(Denmark) DEN	Bo Svensson	14	1	12	1	2	0
3	DF	(Czech Republic) CZE	Zdeněk Pospěch	36	0	34	0	2	0
4	MF	(North Macedonia) MKD	Nikolce Noveski	34	0	32	0	2	0
5	MF	(Germany) GER	Benedikt Saller	15	2	15	2	0	0
6	MF	(Germany) GER	Johannes Geis	34	1	33	1	1	0
7	FW	(Denmark) DEN	Niki Zimling	15	1	13+2	1	0	0
8	MF	(Germany) GER	Christoph Moritz	27	0	21+4	0	2	0
9	FW	(Germany) GER	Sebastian Polter	15	0	13	0	2	0
10	FW	(Cameroon) CMR	Eric Maxim Choupo-Moting	34	11	32	10	2	1
11	FW	(Germany) GER	Yunus Mallı	23	5	21	5	2	0
13	FW	(South Korea) KOR	Koo Ja-cheol	14	1	14	1	0	0
14	MF	(Austria) AUT	Julian Baumgartlinger	11	0	9	0	2	0
15	GK	(Croatia) CRO	Dario Krešić	0	0	0	0	0	0
16	DF	(Germany) GER	Stefan Bell	27	0	27	0	0	0
18	FW	(Germany) GER	Dani Schahin	3	0	2+1	0	0	0
19	FW	(Colombia) COL	Elkin Soto	21	0	20	0	1	0
20	DF	(Costa Rica) CRC	Júnior Díaz	20	0	20	0	0	0
21	GK	(Germany) GER	Loris Karius	21	0	21	0	0	0
22	DF	(Germany) GER	Julian Koch	3	0	3	0	0	0
23	FW	(Japan) JPN	Shinji Okazaki	35	15	33	15	2	0
24	MF	(South Korea) KOR	Park Joo-ho	29	2	27	2	2	0
26	MF	(Germany) GER	Niko Bungert	10	1	10	1	0	0
27	MF	(Germany) GER	Nicolai Müller	28	10	26	9	2	1
29	MF	(Germany) GER	Christian Wetklo	3	0	0+2	0	1	0
31	FW	(Germany) GER	Shawn Parker	12	1	11	1	1	0
35	FW	(Croatia) CRO	Petar Sliskovic	2	0	0+2	0	0	0
