= Tanju Öztürk =

German footballer

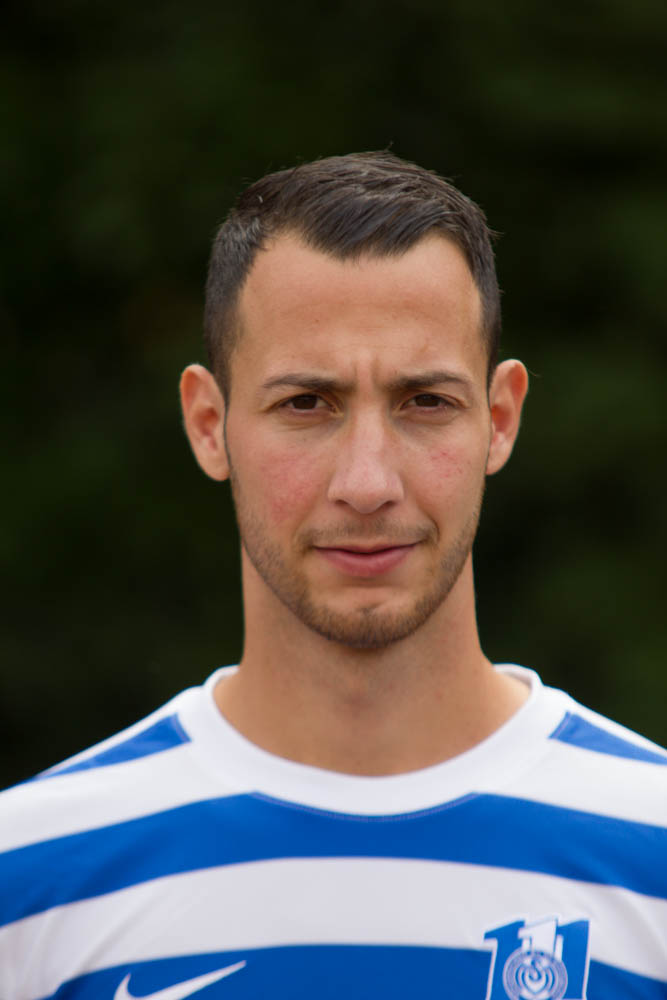
- Öztürk with MSV Duisburg in 2013

Personal information
- Date of birth: 22 July 1989 (age 37)
- Place of birth: Cologne, West Germany
- Height: 1.90 m (6 ft 3 in)
- Positions: Centre-back; midfielder

Team information
- Current team: Rot-Weiß Oberhausen
- Number: 25

Youth career
- 1996–1997: Viktoria Köln
- 1997–1999: Bayer Leverkusen
- 1999–2002: Viktoria Köln
- 2002–2004: Bergisch Gladbach
- 2004–2006: Alemannia Aachen
- 2006–2008: MSV Duisburg

Senior career*
| Years | Team | Apps | (Gls) |
| 2008–2011 | MSV Duisburg II | 114 | (10) |
| 2012–2015 | MSV Duisburg | 61 | (1) |
| 2015–2016 | Schalke 04 II | 46 | (3) |
| 2016–2019 | KFC Uerdingen 05 | 42 | (8) |
| 2019–2020 | Hansa Rostock | 25 | (1) |
| 2020– | Rot-Weiß Oberhausen | 147 | (10) |
- * Club domestic league appearances and goals as of 12 October 2025

Tanju Öztürk (born 22 July 1989) is a German professional footballer who plays as a centre-back or midfielder for Rot-Weiß Oberhausen.

== Career ==
Öztürk played his first Bundesliga match for MSV Duisburg on 18 March 2012 in a 2–1 home win against VfL Bochum.

On 15 January 2015, he joined FC Schalke 04 II.

In January 2019, Öztürk was one of two players to be suspended by KFC Uerdingen 05 for "disciplinary reasons".

== Career statistics ==
As of 18 October 2015

Appearances and goals by club, season and competition
| Club | Season | League | | | Cup | | Continental | | Other | | Total | |
| Club | Season | Division | App. | Goals | App. | Goals | App. | Goals | App. | Goals | App. | Goals |
|---|---|---|---|---|---|---|---|---|---|---|---|---|
| MSV Duisburg II | 2007–08 | Oberliga Nordrhein | 1 | 0 | 0 | 0 | – | | 0 | 0 | 1 | 0 |
| MSV Duisburg II | 2008–09 | NRW-Liga | 24 | 2 | – | | – | | 0 | 0 | 24 | 2 |
| MSV Duisburg II | 2009–10 | NRW-Liga | 34 | 0 | – | | – | | 0 | 0 | 34 | 0 |
| MSV Duisburg II | 2010–11 | NRW-Liga | 25 | 3 | – | | – | | 0 | 0 | 25 | 3 |
| MSV Duisburg II | 2011–12 | NRW-Liga | 19 | 5 | – | | – | | 0 | 0 | 19 | 5 |
| MSV Duisburg II | 2012–13 | Regionalliga West | 8 | 0 | – | | – | | 0 | 0 | 8 | 0 |
| MSV Duisburg II | 2014–15 | Oberliga Niederrhein | 3 | 0 | – | | – | | 0 | 0 | 3 | 0 |
| MSV Duisburg II | Total | | 114 | 10 | 0 | 0 | 0 | 0 | 0 | 0 | 114 | 10 |
| MSV Duisburg | 2011–12 | 2. Bundesliga | 8 | 0 | 0 | 0 | – | | 0 | 0 | 8 | 0 |
| MSV Duisburg | 2012–13 | 2. Bundesliga | 21 | 0 | 1 | 0 | – | | 0 | 0 | 22 | 0 |
| MSV Duisburg | 2013–14 | 3. Liga | 32 | 1 | 1 | 0 | – | | 0 | 0 | 33 | 1 |
| MSV Duisburg | Total | | 61 | 1 | 2 | 0 | 0 | 0 | 0 | 0 | 63 | 1 |
| Schalke 04 II | 2014–15 | Regionalliga West | 14 | 1 | – | | – | | 0 | 0 | 14 | 1 |
| Schalke 04 II | 2015–16 | Regionalliga West | 11 | 2 | – | | – | | 0 | 0 | 11 | 2 |
| Schalke 04 II | Total | | 25 | 3 | 0 | 0 | 0 | 0 | 0 | 0 | 25 | 3 |
| Career total | | | 200 | 14 | 2 | 0 | 0 | 0 | 0 | 0 | 202 | 14 |
