= Brad Hennen =

American politician

Member-elect of the Minnesota House of Representatives from the 15A district
- Assuming office January 12, 2027
- Succeeding: Chris Swedzinski

Personal details
- Party: Republican
- Website: hennen4house.com

Brad Hennen is an American politician who is the representative-elect for district 15A in the Minnesota House of Representatives. A member of the Minnesota Republican Party, he was elected in 2026. Hennen is from Ghent, Minnesota.
