= Xhelil Abdulla =

Macedonian footballer (born 1991)

Personal information
- Date of birth: 25 September 1991 (age 35)
- Place of birth: Tetovo, SR Macedonia, SFR Yugoslavia
- Height: 1.90 m (6 ft 3 in)
- Position: Centre-back

Team information
- Current team: Arsimi
- Number: 3

Senior career*
Years	Team	Apps	(Gls)
2009–2011	Shkëndija	14	(0)
2011–2012	De Graafschap	4	(0)
2012–2013	MSV Duisburg II	18	(0)
2014	Gorno Lisiče	13	(1)
2015	Shkëndija	21	(1)
2016–2019	Renova	78	(2)
2019	Llapi	10	(0)
2020–2022	Renova	66	(0)
2022–2023	Shkupi	10	(0)
2023–2024	Gostivari	20	(1)
2024–2026	Makedonija G.P.	10	(0)
2026	KF Arsimi		(0)

International career^{‡}
2010–2012	Macedonia U-21	7	(0)
2014–	Macedonia	2	(0)
- * Club domestic league appearances and goals as of 1 June 2024 ‡ National team caps and goals as of 1 May 2023

Xhelil Abdulla (Macedonian: Џељиљ Абдула, Dželil Abdula; born 25 September 1991) is a Macedonian professional footballer who plays as a central defender for Gostivari. He is of Albanian origin.

== Club career ==
Abdulla signed a three-year contract with Dutch side De Graafschap in summer 2011. In June 2019, he joined KF Llapi in Kosovo.

== International career ==
Abdulla made his debut for North Macedonia in a June 2014 friendly match against China and has, as of February 2020, earned a total of two caps. His second international was the second of two friendlies against China in June 2014.

== Honours ==
Shkëndija

- First Macedonian Football League: 2010–11
