= Murat Doymus =

German footballer

Personal information
- Date of birth: 19 November 1985 (age 40)
- Place of birth: Germany
- Position: Defender

Senior career*
Years	Team	Apps	(Gls)
-2005/06	1. FSV Mainz 05	0	(0)
2005/2006	Samsunspor	0	(0)
2006–2007	Berliner AK 07	21	(1)
2007–2010	Türkiyemspor Berlin	61+	(5+)
2010–2012	Berliner AK 07	32	(3)
2012–2013	Sumgayit FK	26	(1)
2013–2015	FC Viktoria 1889 Berlin	27	(2)
2015–2016	TSV Schott Mainz	17	(0)
2016/2017	SpVgg Nassau Wiesbaden	5	(0)
2016/17-2017/18	FV Delkenheim	3+	(0+)
- * Club domestic league appearances and goals

Murat Doymus (born 19 November 1985 in Germany) is a German retired footballer.

== Career ==
In 2012, Doymus signed for Azerbaijani club Sumgayit, who contacted him after he played against them for Berliner AK 07 in a friendly in Turkey. Initially, he was hesitant to sign but was persuaded by teammate Pardis Fardjad-Azad, who signed after his contract expired.

Comparing football in Germany to football in Azerbaijan, Doymus stated that there is less of a fan culture in Azerbaijan.

In 2015, he founded the first eSports club in Wiesbaden.
