= Adli Lachheb =

Tunisian footballer (born 1987)

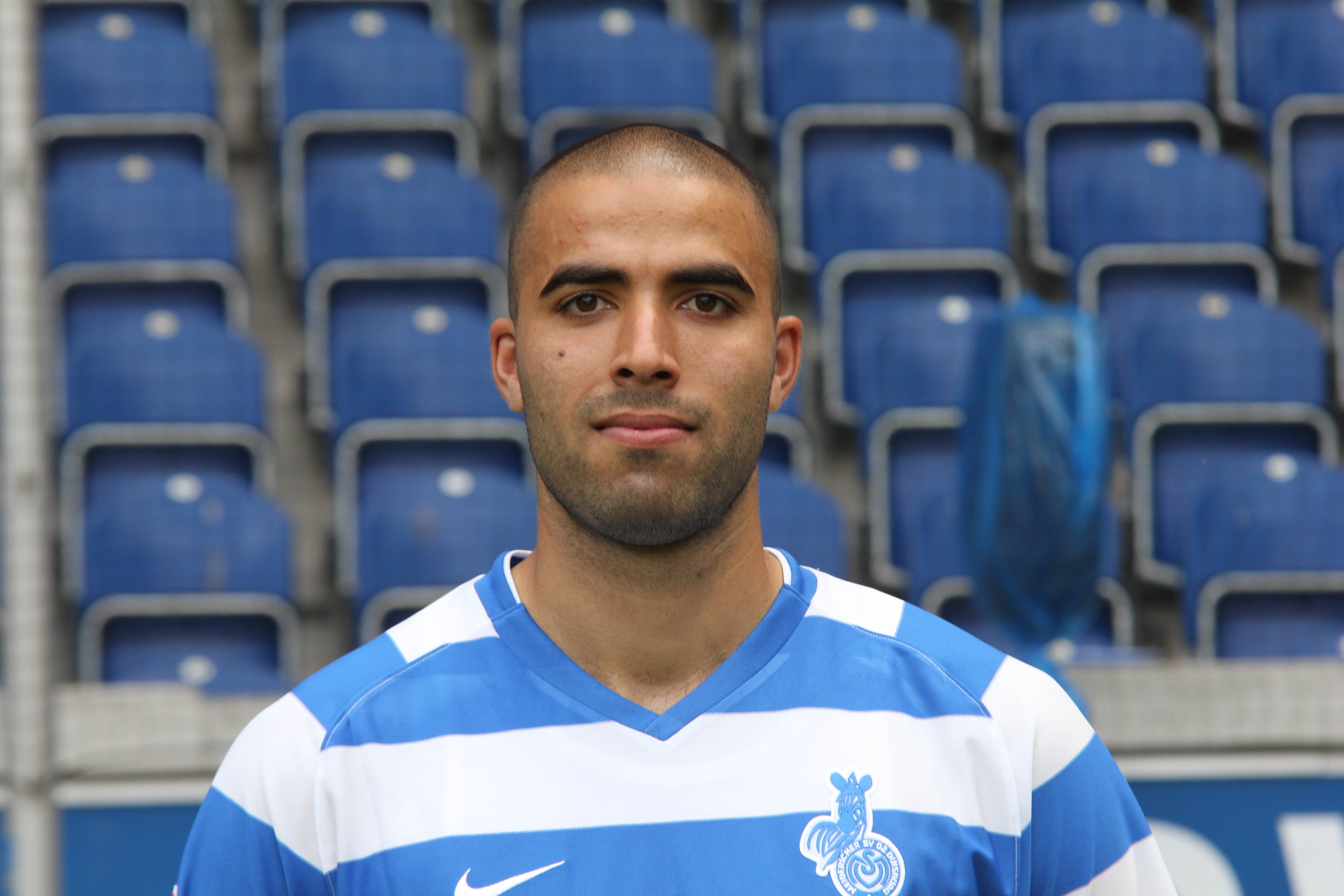
- Lachheb with MSV Duisburg in 2012

Personal information
- Date of birth: 22 June 1987 (age 39)
- Place of birth: Monastir, Tunisia
- Height: 1.94 m (6 ft 4 in)
- Position: Centre-back

Youth career
- 1999–2006: US Monastir

Senior career*
Years	Team	Apps	(Gls)
2006–2007	US Monastir		
2007–2008	Kickers Offenbach II		
2008–2010	Hallescher FC	63	(3)
2010–2012	Erzgebirge Aue	55	(2)
2012–2013	MSV Duisburg	17	(0)
2013–2014	Hallescher FC	5	(0)
2014	KSV Hessen Kassel	14	(0)
2015	Jahn Regensburg	5	(0)
2015–2016	Berliner FC Dynamo	9	(0)
2016–2018	VfB Germania Halberstadt	32	(1)
2018–2022	SV Straelen	86	(6)
- * Club domestic league appearances and goals

Adli Lachheb (born 22 June 1987) is a Tunisian former professional footballer who played as a centre-back.

== Career ==
In 2015 Lachheb moved to Jahn Regensburg.

He retired in summer 2022 after four years with SV Straelen and became assistant coach to new manager Sunday Oliseh at the club.
