= Stephan Hennen =

German footballer

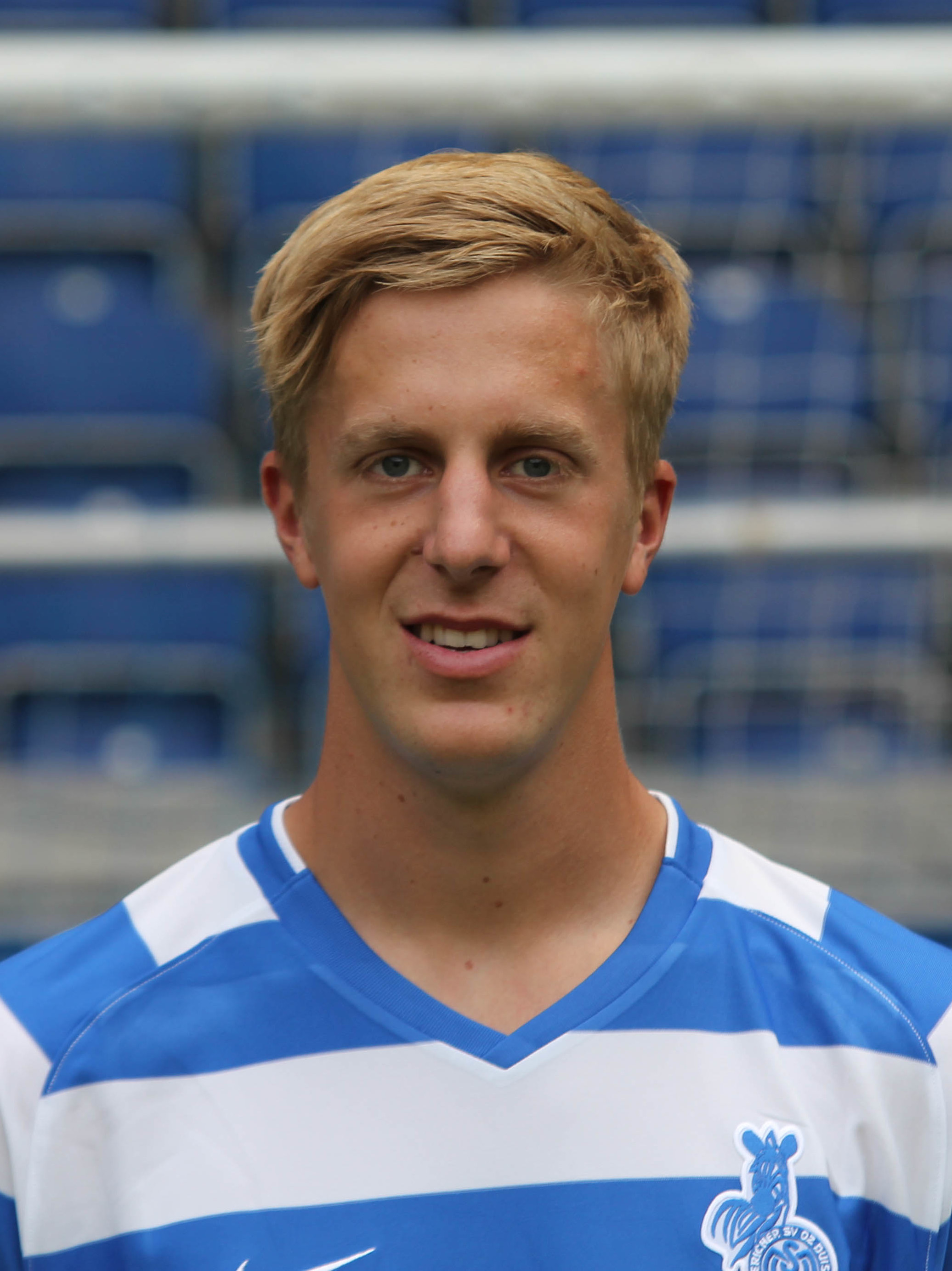
- Stephan Hennen with MSV Duisburg in 2012

Personal information
- Date of birth: 9 January 1990 (age 36)
- Place of birth: Duisburg, West Germany
- Height: 1.86 m (6 ft 1 in)
- Position: Defender

Youth career
- 1994–1996: Viktoria Buchholz
- 1996–1999: VfL Duisburg-Süd
- 1999–2009: MSV Duisburg

Senior career*
Years	Team	Apps	(Gls)
2009–2013	MSV Duisburg II	93	(4)
2012–2013	MSV Duisburg	1	(0)
2013–2014	TuS 64 Bösinghoven	4	(0)
2015	FSV Duisburg	13	(0)
Total		111	(4)
- * Club domestic league appearances and goals

Stephan Hennen (born 9 January 1990) is a German former footballer who played as a defender.

== Career ==
Hennen played his first Bundesliga match for MSV Duisburg on 23 August 2012 in a 1–3 home loss against Dynamo Dresden. He left MSV Duisburg in summer 2013.

After a spell with TuS 64 Bösinghoven, he retired through injury and took up a role in marketing for SGS Essen, having previously studied sport management.

He returned to football by signing for FSV Duisburg in March 2015. He left the club in September 2015 following the departure of manager Heiko Heinlein.
