= Sven Hoffmeister =

German footballer

Personal information
- Date of birth: 13 October 1970 (age 56)
- Place of birth: Hannover, West Germany
- Position: Goalkeeper

Team information
- Current team: FSV Mainz 05 (Goalkeeper Coach)

Youth career
- –1989: Olympia Kassel

Senior career*
Years	Team	Apps	(Gls)
1989–1990	Olympia Kassel		
1990–1994	KSV Baunatal		
1994–1995	Hessen Kassel	6	(0)
1995–1999	SC Neukirchen	114	(0)
1999–2000	SV Wehen	49	(0)
2000–2005	FSV Mainz 05	4	(0)
2005–2007	Kickers Emden	71	(0)
2007–2008	SSV Reutlingen	15	(0)
2008–2010	SV Sandhausen	4	(0)
2010–2014	Hessen Kassel	10	(0)
- * Club domestic league appearances and goals

Sven Hoffmeister (born 13 October 1970) is a German former footballer who played as a goalkeeper. He is now goalkeeper coach of FSV Mainz 05.
