= Tobias Willi =

German footballer

Personal information
- Date of birth: 14 December 1979 (age 46)
- Place of birth: Freiburg, West Germany
- Height: 1.77 m (5 ft 10 in)
- Position: Midfielder

Youth career
- VfR Pfaffenweiler
- SC Freiburg

Senior career*
Years	Team	Apps	(Gls)
1999–2005	SC Freiburg	114	(2)
2005	Austria Salzburg	10	(0)
2005–2010	MSV Duisburg	76	(2)
Total		200	(4)

International career
1999–2001	Germany U-21	15	(0)
- * Club domestic league appearances and goals

Tobias Willi (born 14 December 1979 in Freiburg) is a German former professional football midfielder who played for SC Freiburg, Austria Salzburg, and MSV Duisburg.
