= 2008–09 1. FSV Mainz 05 season =

1. FSV Mainz 05
2008–09 season
- Head coach: Jørn Andersen
- Stadium: Bruchwegstadion
- 2. Bundesliga: 2nd (promoted)
- DFB-Pokal: Semi-finals

The 2008–09 season was the 104th season in the existence of 1. FSV Mainz 05 and the club's second consecutive season in the top flight of German football. In addition to the domestic league, 1. FSV Mainz 05 participated in this season's edition of the DFB-Pokal. The season covered the period from 1 July 2008 to 30 June 2009.

== Transfers ==
=== In ===
- Leo Van Le

== Competitions ==
=== Overall record ===
Competition	First match	Last match	Starting round	Final position	Record							
Competition	First match	Last match	Starting round	Final position	Pld	W	D	L	GF	GA	GD	Win %
2. Bundesliga	15 August 2008	May 2009	Matchday 1	2nd	34	18	9	7	62	37	+25	52.94
DFB-Pokal	9 August 2008	21 April 2009	First round	Semi-finals	5	4	0	1	10	8	+2	80.00
Total					39	22	9	8	72	45	+27	56.41

Source: Competitions

=== 2. Bundesliga ===
==== League table ====
Pos	Team	Pld	W	D	L	GF	GA	GD	Pts	Promotion, qualification or relegation
1	SC Freiburg (C, P)	34	21	5	8	60	36	+24	68	Promotion to Bundesliga
2	Mainz 05 (P)	34	18	9	7	62	37	+25	63	Promotion to Bundesliga
3	1. FC Nürnberg (O, P)	34	16	12	6	51	29	+22	60	Qualification for promotion play-offs
4	Alemannia Aachen	34	16	8	10	58	38	+20	56	
5	Greuther Fürth	34	16	8	10	60	46	+14	56	

Source: kicker
Rules for classification: 1) points; 2) goal difference; 3) number of goals scored.
(C) Champions; (O) Play-off winners; (P) Promoted

==== Results by round ====
Round	1	2	3	4	5	6	7	8	9	10	11	12	13	14	15	16	17	18	19	20	21	22	23	24	25	26	27	28	29	30	31	32	33	34
Ground	H	A	H	A	H	A	H	A	H	A	A	H	A	H	A	H	A	A	H	A	H	A	H	A	H	A	H	H	A	H	A	H	A	H
Result	D	W	W	D	W	W	W	L	D	W	W	L	W	D	W	L	L	D	D	W	W	D	D	W	L	W	L	D	W	W	L	W	W	W
Position																																		

Source: DFB
A = Away; H = Home; W = Win; D = Draw; L = Loss

==== Matches ====
15 August 2008 1	Mainz 05	3–3	1. FC Kaiserslautern
CEST (UTC+2)

22 August 2008 2	1860 Munich	1–2	Mainz 05
CEST (UTC+2)

29 August 2008 3	Mainz 05	4–2	VfL Osnabrück
CEST (UTC+2)

12 September 2008 4	Hansa Rostock	2–2	Mainz 05
CEST (UTC+2)

19 September 2008 5	Mainz 05	2–0	1. FC Nürnberg
CEST (UTC+2)

28 September 2008 6	FC Augsburg	0–2	Mainz 05
CEST (UTC+2)

6 October 2008 7	Mainz 05	5–0	Wehen Wiesbaden
CEST (UTC+2)

20 October 2008 8	Alemannia Aachen	2–0	Mainz 05
CEST (UTC+2)

26 October 2008 9	Mainz 05	0–0	MSV Duisburg
CEST (UTC+2)

29 October 2008 10	SC Freiburg	0–1	Mainz 05
CEST (UTC+2)

2 November 2008 11	Rot Weiss Ahlen	0–2	Mainz 05
CEST (UTC+2)

9 November 2008 12	Mainz 05	0–3	FC Ingolstadt
CEST (UTC+2)

16 November 2008 13	TuS Koblenz	0–3	Mainz 05
CEST (UTC+2)

23 November 2008 14	Mainz 05	2–2	FC St. Pauli
CEST (UTC+2)

1 December 2008 15	FSV Frankfurt	1–4	Mainz 05
CEST (UTC+2)

5 December 2008 16	Mainz 05	0–1	Greuther Fürth
CEST (UTC+2)

14 December 2008 17	Rot-Weiß Oberhausen	2–1	Mainz 05
CEST (UTC+2)

2 February 2009 18	1. FC Kaiserslautern	1–1	Mainz 05
CEST (UTC+2)

8 February 2009 19	Mainz 05	2–2	1860 Munich
CEST (UTC+2)

15 February 2009 20	VfL Osnabrück	1–3	Mainz 05
CEST (UTC+2)

20 February 2009 21	Mainz 05	3–1	Hansa Rostock
CEST (UTC+2)

27 February 2009 22	1. FC Nürnberg	0–0	Mainz 05
CEST (UTC+2)

8 March 2009 23	Mainz 05	1–1	FC Augsburg
CEST (UTC+2)

16 March 2009 24	Wehen Wiesbaden	0–2	Mainz 05
CEST (UTC+2)

22 March 2009 25	Mainz 05	1–4	Alemannia Aachen
CEST (UTC+2)

3 April 2009 26	MSV Duisburg	0–1	Mainz 05
CEST (UTC+2)

13 April 2009 27	Mainz 05	1–2	SC Freiburg
CEST (UTC+2)

17 April 2009 28	Mainz 05	0–0	Rot Weiss Ahlen
CEST (UTC+2)

26 April 2009 29	FC Ingolstadt	3–4	Mainz 05
CEST (UTC+2)

3 May 2009 30	Mainz 05	2–0	TuS Koblenz
CEST (UTC+2)

10 May 2009 31	FC St. Pauli	2–0	Mainz 05
CEST (UTC+2)

13 May 2009 32	Mainz 05	2–1	FSV Frankfurt
CEST (UTC+2)

17 May 2009 33	Greuther Fürth	0–2	Mainz 05
CEST (UTC+2)

24 May 2009 34	Mainz 05	4–0	Rot-Weiß Oberhausen
CEST (UTC+2)

=== DFB-Pokal ===
9 August 2008 First round	SV Babelsberg 03	1–2 (a.e.t.)	Mainz 05	Potsdam-Babelsberg
15:30 CEST (UTC+2)	Moritz 90'	Report	Feulner 90'; Bogavac 107'	Stadium: Karl-Liebknecht-Stadion; Attendance: 3,399; Referee: Holger Henschel

23 September 2008 Second round	Mainz 05	3–1	1. FC Köln	Mainz
19:00 CEST (UTC+2)		Report		Stadium: Bruchwegstadion; Attendance: 19,300; Referee: Herbert Fandel

27 January 2009 Round of 16	SC Freiburg	1–3	Mainz 05	Freiburg
20:30 CET (UTC+1)		Report		Stadium: Schwarzwald-Stadion; Attendance: 13,000; Referee: Peter Sippel

3 March 2009 Quarter-finals	Mainz 05	1–0	Schalke 04	Mainz
20:30 CET (UTC+1)		Report		Stadium: Bruchwegstadion; Attendance: 20,300; Referee: Felix Brych

21 April 2009 Semi-finals	Bayer Leverkusen	4–1 (a.e.t.)	Mainz 05	Leverkusen
20:30 CEST (UTC+2)		Report		Stadium: LTU Arena; Attendance: 35,000; Referee: Michael Weiner
