= Timo Perthel =

German footballer

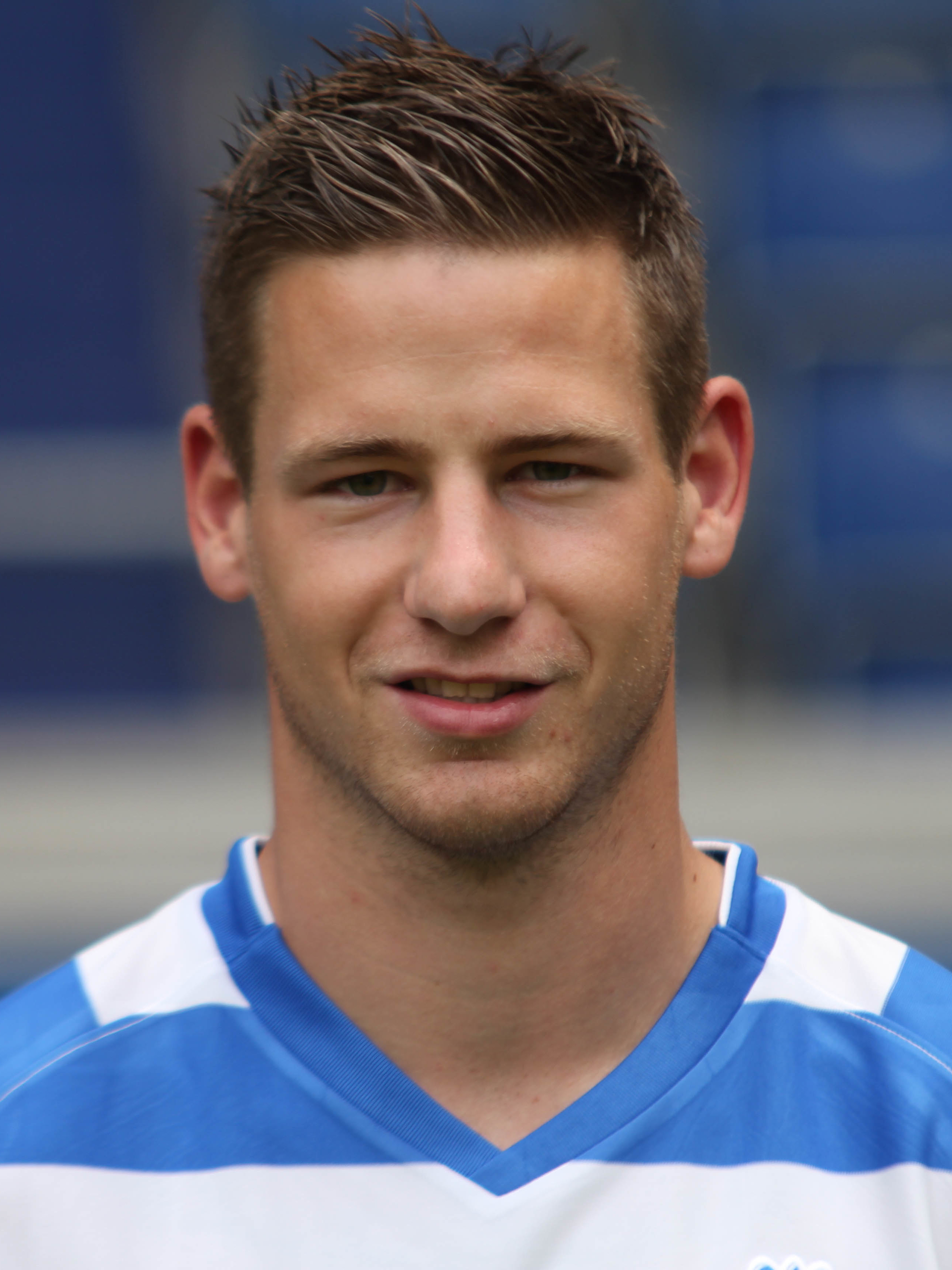
- Perthel with MSV Duisburg in 2012

Personal information
- Full name: Timo Christopher Perthel
- Date of birth: 11 February 1989 (age 37)
- Place of birth: Kaiserslautern, West Germany
- Height: 1.83 m (6 ft 0 in)
- Position: Left-back

Team information
- Current team: DSV Leoben
- Number: 24

Youth career
- 1995–1999: TuS Syke
- 1999–2008: Werder Bremen

Senior career*
Years	Team	Apps	(Gls)
2008–2010	Werder Bremen II	62	(3)
2009–2011	Werder Bremen	1	(0)
2010–2011	→ Sturm Graz (loan)	20	(0)
2011–2012	Hansa Rostock	25	(1)
2012–2013	MSV Duisburg	17	(4)
2013–2014	Eintracht Braunschweig	11	(0)
2014–2019	VfL Bochum	74	(1)
2019–2021	1. FC Magdeburg	42	(1)
2022–	DSV Leoben	52	(3)

International career
2006–2007	Germany U18	5	(1)
2007–2008	Germany U19	5	(0)
2008–2009	Germany U20	3	(1)
Medal record
SK Sturm Graz
Winner	Bundesliga	2010–11
- * Club domestic league appearances and goals as of 28 December 2024

Timo Christopher Perthel (born 11 February 1989) is a German professional footballer who plays as a left-back for DSV Leoben.

== Career ==
=== Werder Bremen ===
Perthel made his Bundesliga debut on 3 May 2009 for Werder Bremen in a match against 1. FC Köln. He was substituted on in the 72nd minute for Peter Niemeyer. In July 2011, he left Werder to join Hansa Rostock.

=== Eintracht Braunschweig ===
In June 2013, he signed a contract with Bundesliga side Eintracht Braunschweig.

== Career statistics ==
As of 1 August 2021

Appearances and goals by club, season and competition
Club	Season	League			Cup		Continental		Total	
Club	Season	Division	Apps	Goals	Apps	Goals	Apps	Goals	Apps	Goals
Werder Bremen II	2008–09	3. Liga	32	2	—		—		32	2
Werder Bremen II	2009–10	3. Liga	26	1	—		—		26	1
Werder Bremen II	2010–11	3. Liga	4	0	—		—		4	0
Werder Bremen II	Total		62	3	0	0	0	0	62	3
Werder Bremen	2008–09	Bundesliga	1	0	0	0	0	0	1	0
Sturm Graz	2010–11	Austrian Bundesliga	20	0	2	0	0	0	22	0
Hansa Rostock	2011–12	2. Bundesliga	25	1	1	0	—		26	1
MSV Duisburg	2012–13	2. Bundesliga	17	4	0	0	—		17	4
Eintracht Braunschweig	2013–14	Bundesliga	11	0	1	1	—		12	1
VfL Bochum	2014–15	2. Bundesliga	26	0	1	0	—		27	0
VfL Bochum	2015–16	2. Bundesliga	25	1	4	0	—		29	1
VfL Bochum	2016–17	2. Bundesliga	14	0	1	0	—		15	0
VfL Bochum	2017–18	2. Bundesliga	0	0	0	0	—		0	0
VfL Bochum	2018–19	2. Bundesliga	9	0	1	0	—		10	0
VfL Bochum	Total		74	1	7	0	0	0	81	1
1. FC Magdeburg	2018–19	2. Bundesliga	13	1	0	0	—		13	1
1. FC Magdeburg	2019–20	3. Liga	21	0	1	0	—		22	0
1. FC Magdeburg	2020–21	3. Liga	8	0	1	0	—		9	0
1. FC Magdeburg	Total		42	1	2	0	0	0	44	1
Career total			252	10	13	1	0	0	265	11
