= Maurice Exslager =

German footballer (born 1991)

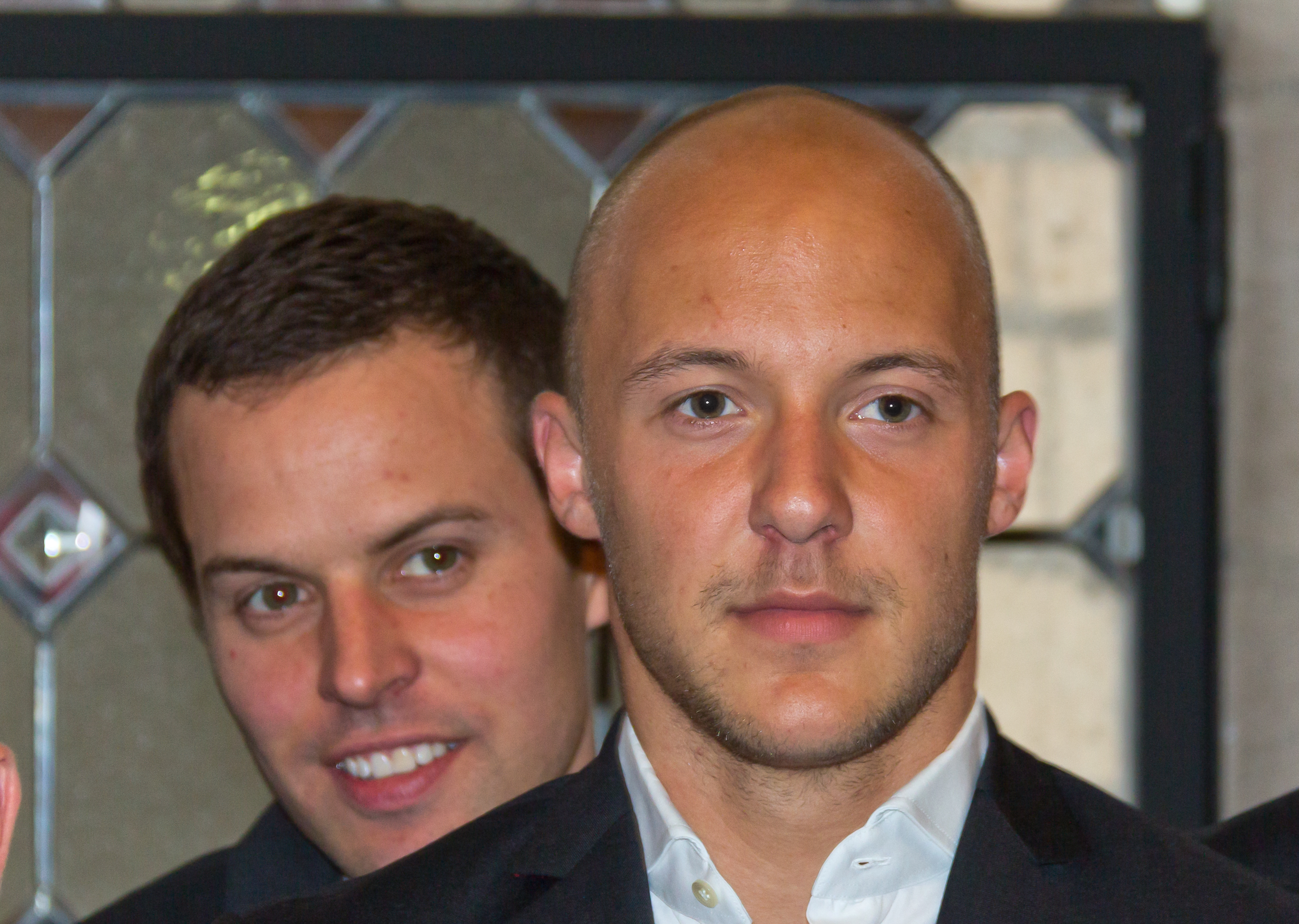
- Exslager with 1. FC Köln, 2014

Personal information
- Date of birth: 12 February 1991 (age 35)
- Place of birth: Bocholt, Germany
- Height: 1.78 m (5 ft 10 in)
- Position: Forward

Team information
- Current team: SC Frintrop
- Number: 9

Youth career
- 1996–2003: SV Biemenhorst
- 2003–2007: FC Bocholt
- 2007–2008: TuB Bocholt
- 2008–2009: MSV Duisburg

Senior career*
Years	Team	Apps	(Gls)
2009–2013	MSV Duisburg	70	(11)
2013–2016	FC Köln	13	(0)
2013–2016	FC Köln II	25	(17)
2014–2015	→ Darmstadt 98 (loan)	12	(0)
2016–2017	FC Magdeburg	8	(0)
2017–2019	Fortuna Köln	11	(0)
2019–2020	1. FC Bocholt	15	(2)
2020–	SC Frintrop	3	(6)

International career
2011	Germany U20	1	(0)
- * Club domestic league appearances and goals as of 18:30, 14 January 2021 (UTC)

Maurice Exslager (born 12 February 1991) is a German footballer who plays as a forward for SC Frintrop 05/21.

== Club career ==
Exslager made his senior debut on 24 April 2010 in a 2. Bundesliga match for MSV Duisburg against SC Paderborn.

In June 2013, he moved to 2. Bundesliga club 1. FC Köln. On 23 June 2014, Exslager was loaned to newly promoted 2. Bundesliga side Darmstadt 98 for a year.
