= Benjamin Kern =

German footballer

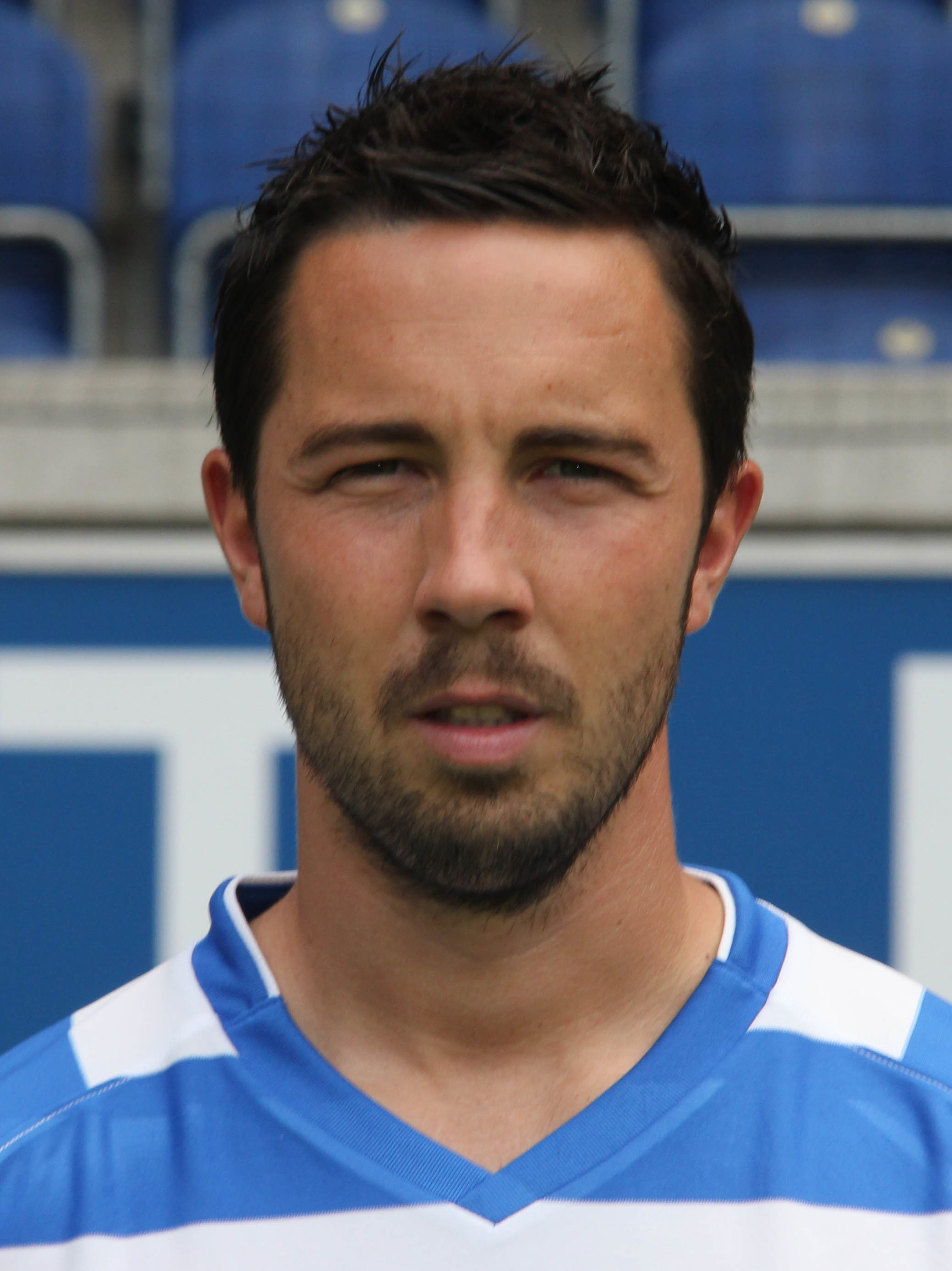
- Kern in 2012

Personal information
- Date of birth: 5 November 1983 (age 42)
- Place of birth: Göppingen, West Germany
- Height: 1.70 m (5 ft 7 in)
- Position: Midfielder

Team information
- Current team: TSG Young Boys

Youth career
- FC Uhingen
- VfB Stuttgart
- SSV Reutlingen
- TSV Schönaich

Senior career*
Years	Team	Apps	(Gls)
–2004	TSV Schönaich		
2004–2006	SV Darmstadt 98	56	(1)
2006–2010	FC Augsburg	63	(1)
2010	→ Rot Weiss Ahlen (loan)	17	(1)
2010–2013	MSV Duisburg	65	(2)
2013–	TSG Young Boys		
- * Club domestic league appearances and goals as of 29 June 2015

Benjamin Kern (born 5 November 1983) is a German footballer, who plays for TSG Young Boys Reutlingen.

== Career ==
He has played for FC Augsburg. After being released he signed a loan contract for Rot Weiss Ahlen in January 2010.
