= Goran Šukalo =

Slovenian footballer

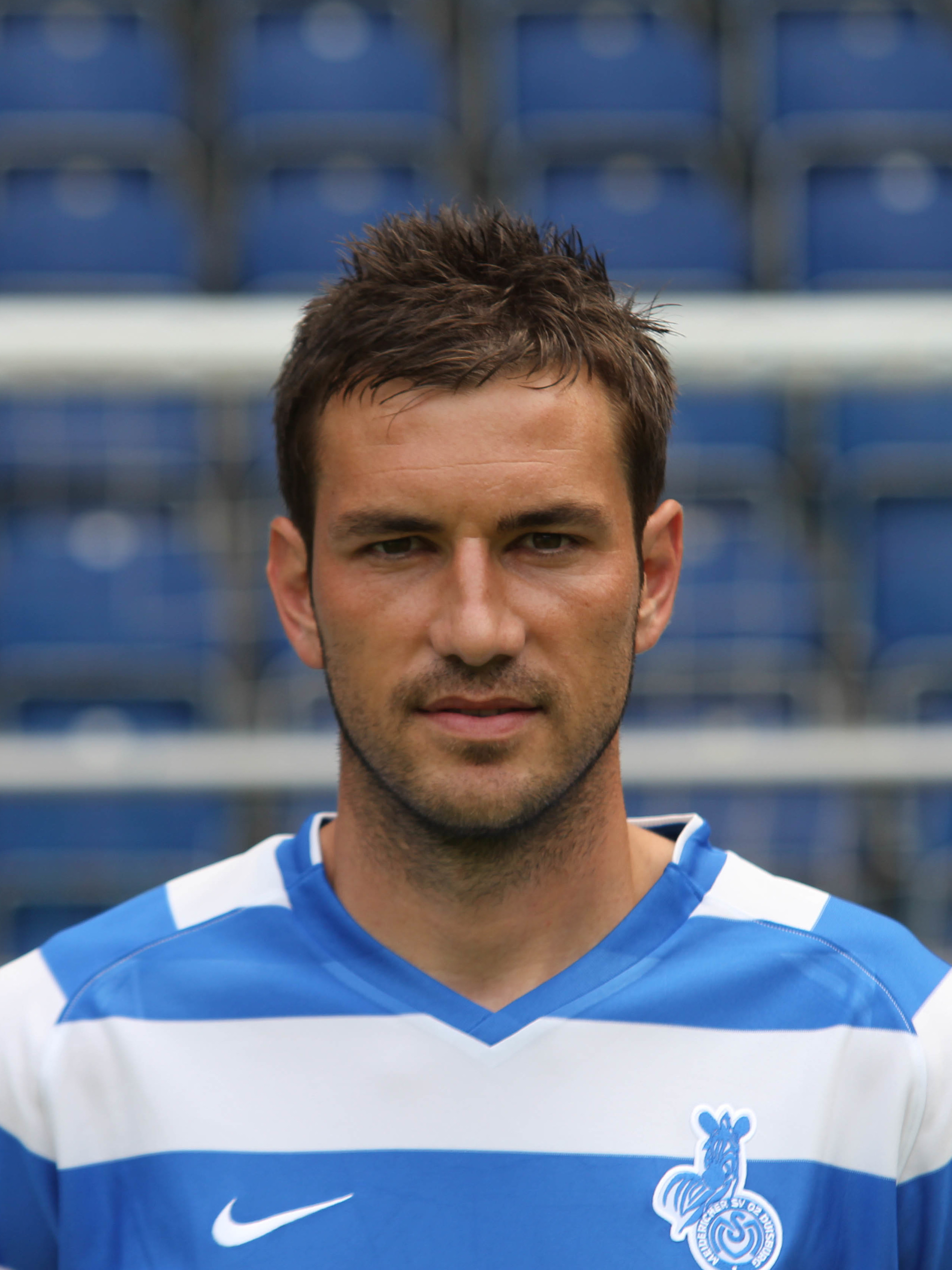
- Šukalo with MSV Duisburg in 2012

Personal information
- Date of birth: 24 August 1981 (age 45)
- Place of birth: Koper, SFR Yugoslavia
- Height: 1.92 m (6 ft 3 1/2 in)
- Position: Midfielder

Youth career
- 1987–2000: Koper

Senior career*
Years	Team	Apps	(Gls)
2000–2001	Koper	42	(3)
2000	→ Jadran Dekani (loan)	5	(3)
2002–2005	SpVgg Unterhaching	91	(10)
2005–2006	Alemannia Aachen	24	(2)
2006–2009	TuS Koblenz	67	(14)
2009–2010	FC Augsburg	2	(0)
2010–2013	MSV Duisburg	88	(15)
2013–2016	Greuther Fürth	54	(11)
2016–2017	1860 Munich	1	(0)

International career
2001–2002	Slovenia U21	7	(2)
2002–2011	Slovenia	34	(2)
2003	Slovenia B	2	(0)
- * Club domestic league appearances and goals

Goran Šukalo (born 24 August 1981) is a Slovenian former footballer who played as a midfielder.

== Club career ==
Šukalo moved to Greuther Fürth in June 2013 on a free transfer. He moved to 1860 Munich on 1 February 2016. His contract was mutually terminated on 3 February 2017.

== International career ==
Šukalo played 34 matches for the Slovenia national team between 2002 and 2011.

== Controversies ==
In April 2011, Pozareport.si revealed that the Maribor police department was investigating an illegal betting organization, with six individuals already detained. The police also revealed that two other collaborators were still at large and that one of those was Goran Šukalo, who allegedly invested over €1.9 million in the organization, the majority of which he collected from other professional players. Šukalo categorically denied his involvement in the matter, however, it was revealed by the media and the police that investigators had been tapping the phones of the four persons in custody at the time and had recorded a conversation between Šukalo and the leader of the illegal organization [Kosta Turner] when Šukalo revealed that another football player, Nastja Čeh, was still owing him €73,000 and was avoiding payment. On 11 May 2011, Šukalo had his first preliminary hearing in Maribor district court where he denied his implications and pleaded not guilty. From the criminal charges, written on 49 pages, it was clear that Šukalo was betting with Kosta Turner frequently and that he had made a total of just under €1.7 million of bets in the illegal betting organization.

In January 2012 the general prosecutor of the District Court in Maribor made an indictment of six individuals, written on 30 pages, one of them being Šukalo. Šukalo was said to be the leader of the German part of the illegal betting organization from Maribor and that he was recruiting new members among other football players and friends from Germany. The organization allegedly accepted a total of €43 million worth of bets in two years with €5.5 million coming from Šukalo, which he placed in his name for him and his customers. Once again Šukalo publicly denied his implications and stated that he had nothing to do with the organization.

On 18 April 2013, the District Court in Maribor announced its decision on the matter and Šukalo was acquitted of all charges. Although Šukalo admitted gambling on football, he was found not guilty in participating in the illegal betting organization.
