= Ghent, Minnesota =

- City
- Location of Ghent, Minnesota
- Coordinates: 44°30′42″N 95°53′33″W
- Country: United States
- State: Minnesota
- County: Lyon
- Named for: Ghent, Belgium

Government
  - Type: Mayor–council
  - Mayor: Ronald Sussner

Area
  - Total: 0.31 sq mi (0.81 km^{2})
  - Land: 0.31 sq mi (0.81 km^{2})
  - Water: 0 sq mi (0.00 km^{2})
- Elevation: 1,165 ft (355 m)

Population (2020)
  - Total: 376
  - Density: 1,201.1/sq mi (463.73/km^{2})
- Time zone: UTC-6 (Central (CST))
  - Summer (DST): UTC-5 (CDT)
- ZIP code: 56239
- Area code: 507
- FIPS code: 27-23660
- GNIS feature ID: 2394887
- Website: https://ghentmn.gov/

Ghent (/ɡɛnt/ GHENT) is a city in Lyon County, Minnesota, United States. The population was 376 at the 2020 census.

== History ==
Ghent was originally called Grand View, and was platted under that name in 1878. The present name is after the Belgian city of Ghent. A post office was established as Grandview in 1874, and renamed Ghent in 1882. The city was incorporated in 1899.

== Geography ==
According to the United States Census Bureau, the city has an area of 0.34 square miles (0.88 km^{2}), all land.

== Demographics ==
Historical population
Census	Pop.	Note	%±
1900	119		—
1910	210		76.5%
1920	316		50.5%
1930	281		−11.1%
1940	341		21.4%
1950	336		−1.5%
1960	326		−3.0%
1970	301		−7.7%
1980	356		18.3%
1990	316		−11.2%
2000	315		−0.3%
2010	370		17.5%
2020	376		1.6%
U.S. Decennial Census

=== 2010 census ===
As of the census of 2010, there were 370 people, 155 households, and 108 families living in the city. The population density was 1,088.2 inhabitants per square mile (420.2/km^{2}). There were 164 housing units at an average density of 482.4 per square mile (186.3/km^{2}). The racial makeup of the city was 97.6% White, 1.4% African American, 0.3% Asian, and 0.8% from two or more races.

There were 155 households, of which 34.2% had children under the age of 18 living with them, 58.7% were married couples living together, 7.1% had a female householder with no husband present, 3.9% had a male householder with no wife present, and 30.3% were non-families. 25.8% of all households were made up of individuals, and 3.9% had someone living alone who was 65 years of age or older. The average household size was 2.39 and the average family size was 2.85.

The median age in the city was 32 years. 25.1% of residents were under the age of 18; 9% were between the ages of 18 and 24; 30.8% were from 25 to 44; 24.3% were from 45 to 64; and 10.8% were 65 years of age or older. The gender makeup of the city was 50.8% male and 49.2% female.

=== 2000 census ===
As of the census of 2000, there were 315 people, 128 households, and 89 families living in the city. The population density was 1,173.0 inhabitants per square mile (452.9/km^{2}). There were 131 housing units at an average density of 487.8 per square mile (188.3/km^{2}). The racial makeup of the city was 97.46% White, 1.90% Native American, 0.32% Asian, and 0.32% from two or more races. Hispanic or Latino of any race were 0.63% of the population.

There were 128 households, out of which 35.9% had children under the age of 18 living with them, 55.5% were married couples living together, 10.2% had a female householder with no husband present, and 29.7% were non-families. 25.0% of all households were made up of individuals, and 10.9% had someone living alone who was 65 years of age or older. The average household size was 2.46 and the average family size was 2.91.

In the city, the population was spread out, with 28.3% under the age of 18, 12.4% from 18 to 24, 25.7% from 25 to 44, 21.9% from 45 to 64, and 11.7% who were 65 years of age or older. The median age was 34 years. For every 100 females, there were 86.4 males. For every 100 females age 18 and over, there were 88.3 males.

The median income for a household in the city was $43,125, and the median income for a family was $47,417. Males had a median income of $31,875 versus $18,625 for females. The per capita income for the city was $17,313. About 6.7% of families and 7.6% of the population were below the poverty line, including 8.1% of those under age 18 and 9.5% of those age 65 or over.
