= MSV Duisburg II =

- Full name: Meidericher Spielverein 02 e.V. Duisburg
- Nickname: Die Zebras (The Zebras)
- Founded: 1902 (club); 1958/1959 (reserve team); 2023 (current)
- Dissolved: 2016 (reserve)
Home colours	Away colours

MSV Duisburg II is a German football team located in Duisburg, North Rhine-Westphalia. They are the reserve team of MSV Duisburg.

== History ==
The reserve team was founded in 1958 by the club direction of Meidericher SV which was the name of MSV Duisburg before the city name "Duisburg" was supplemented in 1967. The intention was the possibility to keep and develop talented players who were not yet on the right level for the first team. In the first year, the reserve team could only take part in friendly games. Its official launch was the beginning of the season 1959–60. They started in the lowest league but were regularly promoted during the following years. An important person was the former player Wilhelm Schmidt who managed the team at this time. In 1968, the team was promoted to Verbandsliga Niederrhein which was the third highest division in the 1960s. This success was followed by the relegation in 1970. The time between 1968 and 1970 was the only period in which the team was on the third highest level of the current league system.

Around 1970, MSV Duisburg played in the Bundesliga and was in a struggle with financial problems which was a reason for severe cuts in the budget of the reserve team. This resulted in a decrease into one of the lowest leagues and was followed by a slight stabilization in the mid-1970s. The team remained however in a local league until there was a new upswing starting in 1985. Under the direction of club president Dieter Fischdick who was elected in 1988 the reserve team regained an important role in the strategy of the club. An example for this is the installation of the first team player Ewald Lienen as coach of the reserve team in 1989. Lienen thereby started a successful coaching career. In 1992, they returned to Verbandsliga Niederrhein which had been degraded to the fourth level and then became the fifth level in 1994. The team changed between fourth and fifth level in the next years and had former European champion Bernard Dietz as a very prominent coach between 2002 and 2006. With the beginning of the season 2005–06 the name was officially modified from MSV Duisburg Amateure into MSV Duisburg II. The club decided to close the team following the 2015–16 season.

The second team's withdrawal from competition in 2016 was met with little approval from members and fans, so there had been calls for its re-registration ever since. For the 2023–24 season, MSV once again registered a second team, which started in the second-lowest division of the Lower Rhine amateur football, the Kreisliga C. The new team consists exclusively of playing fans, who do not receive a salary or bonuses. The recreated reserves' formation does not incur any direct costs or additional expenses for the club. The team is self-organized and financially self-sustaining. MSV II plays its home matches at the MTV Stadium in the Warbruckstraße district sports complex, the home ground of MTV Union Hamborn 02.

=== Former players ===
The following players have made part of the reserve team for a longer time and then started a durable professional career:

- Michael Bella
- Adam Bodzek
- Mirko Boland
- Marius Ebbers
- Horst Gecks
- Joachim Hopp
- Rüdiger Mielke
- Sascha Mölders
- Tanju Öztürk
- Thomas Puschmann
- Franz-Josef Steininger
- Simon Terodde
- Carsten Wolters

Herbert Bella, the brother of former German international Michael Bella, held the record for the greatest number of matches for the reserve team although the precious number is unknown. Nevertheless, he never became part of the professional team of MSV Duisburg. Goalkeeper Rainer Rissel also made part of the team for a long time before he debuted for Duisburg's first team and had his first and only professional match at the age of 40.
