= 2012–13 SV Werder Bremen season =

Werder Bremen
2012–13 season
- Manager: Thomas Schaaf
- Stadium: Weserstadion, Bremen, Bremen
- Bundesliga: 14th
- DFB-Pokal: Round 1
- Top goalscorer: League: Nils Petersen (11); Aaron Hunt (11); All: Nils Petersen (11); Aaron Hunt (11)
Home colours	Away colours	Third colours

The 2012–13 Werder Bremen season was the club's 103rd season in its history. In 2012–13, the club participated in the Bundesliga, the top tier of German football; it is the club's 32nd consecutive season in this league, having been promoted from the 2. Bundesliga in 1981.

The club also took part in the 2012–13 edition of the DFB-Pokal, where it was knocked out by 3. Liga side Preußen Münster in the first round.

== Review and events ==
Werder Bremen presented Wiesenhof as its new shirt sponsor on 13 August 2012. Supporters of the club were outraged over Wiesenhof's sponsorship of the club that several supporters have cancelled their membership in the club. The conduct of Wiesenhof was reported in a documentary in Germany in 2011 where they have been "accused of treating the poultry in its care cruelly and keeping them in inhumane conditions".

The club opened its Bundesliga campaign against Borussia Dortmund, the defending champions. The final score was 2–1 in favour of Borussia Dortmund.

== Matches ==
=== Legend ===
Win Draw Loss Postponed

=== Friendly matches ===
==== Pre-season ====
===== Friendlies =====
11 July 2012	Ostfriesenauswahl	1 – 13	Werder Bremen	Norderney
19:00	Goal		Füllkrug; Avdić; Petersen; Hunt; Arnautović; Junuzović; Trinks

Auswahl Loga/Leer	0 – 11	Werder Bremen
		Petersen; Hunt; Füllkrug; Elia; Naldo; Arnautović; Ekici

17 July 2012	Tirol-Auswahl	–	Werder Bremen	Zell am Ziller
18:00

Werder Bremen	1 – 1	Energie Cottbus
Elia		Adlung

25 July 2012 Friendly	Werder Bremen	1 – 0	{Aberdeen	Bremen
18:00	Elia 24'	Report		Stadium: Weserstadion; Attendance: 8,500

SC Paderborn	2 – 1	Werder Bremen
Yılmaz 35'; Bertels 74'		Junuzović 58'

8 August 2012	Winterthur	–	Werder Bremen
19:00

14 August 2012	OB	1 – 2	Werder Bremen	Faaborg
18:00	N'Koum 84'		Bargfrede 29'; Trinks 52'	Stadium: Horne Idrætscenter

===== Liga-total-Cup =====
4 August 2012 1st Round	Werder Bremen	2–2 (4–2 p)	Bayern Munich	Hamburg
18:35 CEST	Petersen 12'; Füllkrug 43'	Report (in German)	Shaqiri 27'; Kroos 60'	Stadium: Imtech Arena; Attendance: 42,217; Referee: Grudzinski
	Penalties
	Ekici (penalty scored); Fritz (penalty scored); Schmitz (penalty scored); De Bruyne (penalty scored)		(penalty scored) Mandžukić; (penalty scored) Kroos; (penalty missed) Ribéry; (penalty missed) Schweinsteiger

5 August 2012 Final	Borussia Dortmund	3–3 (4–5 p)	Werder Bremen	Hamburg
20:35	Reus 22'; Lewandowski 24', 25'		Füllkrug 3'; Ekici 5'; Hunt 49' (pen.)	Stadium: Imtech Arena; Attendance: 39,175; Referee: Felix Zwayer
	Penalties
	Subotić (penalty missed); Halstenberg (penalty scored); Kehl (penalty scored); Owomoyela (penalty scored); Perišić (penalty scored); Großkreutz (penalty missed)		(penalty scored) Hunt; (penalty missed) Fritz; (penalty scored) Wurtz; (penalty scored) Junuzović; (penalty scored) Füllkrug; (penalty scored) Prödl

=== Bundesliga ===
24 August 2012 1	Borussia Dortmund	2–1	Werder Bremen	Dortmund
20:30	Reus 11'; Gündoğan (yellow card) 21'; Kehl (yellow card) 62'; Götze 81'	Report (in German)	Ignjovski (yellow card) 29'; Junuzović (yellow card) 59'; Gebre Selassie 75'	Stadium: Signal Iduna Park; Attendance: 80,645; Referee: Felix Zwayer

1 September 2012 2	Werder Bremen	2–0	Hamburger SV	Bremen
15:30 CEST (UTC+02:00)	Hunt 52' (pen.); Petersen 67'	Report (in German)	Tesche (yellow card) 80'	Stadium: Weserstadion; Attendance: 42,100; Referee: Knut Kircher

15 September 2012 3	Hannover 96	3–2	Werder Bremen	Hannover
15:30	Haggui (yellow card) 3'; Huszti 6', 90+2' (yellow card) 90+4' (yellow-red card) 90+4'; Andreasen 10'; Schlaudraff (yellow card) 31'; Pinto (yellow card) 88'	Report (in German)	Hunt 26' (pen.); Bergfrede (yellow card) 30'; Papastathopoulos (yellow card) 55'; De Bruyne 74'; Junuzović (yellow card) 75'	Stadium: AWD-Arena; Attendance: 49,000; Referee: Deniz Aytekin

22 September 2012 4	Werder Bremen	2–2	VfB Stuttgart	Bremen
15:30	de Bruyne 23'; Junuzović 34', (yellow card) 40'; Bardfrede (yellow card) 84'; Sokratis (yellow card) 86'; Lukimya-Mulongoti (red card) 90+1'	Report (in German)	Harnik (yellow card) 24' (yellow-red card) 88', (goal) 50'; Hunt (yellow card) 31'; Cacau 81'	Stadium: Weserstadion; Attendance: 40,172; Referee: Guido Winkmann

26 September 2012 5	SC Freiburg	1–2	Werder Bremen	Freiburg
20:00	Diagne (yellow card) 11'; Schmid 36'; Caligiuri (yellow card) 67'	Report (in German)	Akpala 48', (yellow card) 64'; Junuzović (yellow card) 55'; Hunt 59'; Arnautović (yellow card) 90+3'; Mielitz (yellow card) 90+4'	Stadium: Mage Solar Stadion; Attendance: 23,000; Referee: Thomas Kinhöfer

29 September 2012 6	Werder Bremen	0–2	Bayern Munich	Bremen
15:30	Papastathopoulos (yellow card) 14'; Arnautović (yellow card) 80'	Report (in German)	Schweinsteiger (yellow card) 38'; Luiz Gustavo (yellow card) 40', (goal) 81'; Mandžukić 83'	Stadium: Weserstadion; Attendance: 42,100; Referee: Michael Weiner

6 October 2012 7	FC Augsburg	3–1	Werder Bremen	Augsburg
15:30	Werner 2'; Hain 32'; Bancé (yellow card) 58'; Baier 72'; Musano (yellow card) 78'	Report (in German)	De Bruyne 19'; Schmidtz (yellow card) 34'	Stadium: SGL arena Attendance: 28,133; Referee: Knut Kirchner

20 October 2012 8	Werder Bremen	4–0	Borussia Mönchengladbach	Bremen
18:30	Petersen 37'; Arnautović 45'; De Bruyne (yellow card) 54'; Füllkrug 76'; Junuzović 86'	Report (in German)	Nordtveit (yellow card) 59'; Jantschke (yellow card) 60'	Stadium: Weserstadion; Attendance: 42,100; Referee: Günther Perl

27 October 2012 9	Greuther Fürth	1–1	Werder Bremen	Fürth
15:30 CEST	Edu 8'; Fürstner (yellow card) 17'; Prib (yellow card) 53'; Azemi (yellow card) 89'	Report (in German)	Petersen 44'; Gebre Selassie (yellow card) 72'	Stadium: Trolli Arena; Attendance: 18,000; Referee: Tobias Stieler

4 November 2012 10	Werder Bremen	2–1	Mainz 05	Bremen
17:30	Hunt 10', 85'; De Bruyne (yellow card) 68'	Report (in German)	Kirchhoff (yellow card) 21'; Zabavník (yellow card) 55'; Szalai 64', (yellow card) 74'	Stadium: Weserstadion; Attendance: 39,114; Referee: Manuel Gräfe

10 November 2012 11	Schalke 04	2–1	Werder Bremen	Gelsenkirchen
15:30	Neustädter 59', (yellow card) 75'; Draxler 69'	Report (in German)	Hunt 16', (yellow card) 83'	Stadium: Veltins-Arena; Attendance: 61,673; Referee: Florian Meyer

18 November 2012 12	Werder Bremen	2–1	Fortuna Düsseldorf	Bremen
15:30	Lukimya-Mulongoti (yellow card) 36' (yellow-red card) 77'; Petersen 51'; Hunt (yellow card) 78'; De Bruyne 82'	Report (in German)	Langeneke 19' (pen.); Ilsø (yellow card) 37'; Giefer (yellow card) 74'; Lambertz (yellow card) 75'	Stadium: Weserstadion; Attendance: 42,100; Referee: Peter Sippel

24 November 2012 13	VfL Wolfsburg	1–1	Werder Bremen	Wolfsburg
15:30	Olić (yellow card) 26'; Dost 64'; Josué (yellow card) 88'	Report (in German)	Arnautović 35', (yellow card) 82'; Schmitz (yellow card) 40' (yellow-red card) 62'; De Bruyne (yellow card) 87'	Stadium: Volkswagen-Arena; Attendance: 29,723; Referee: Markus Schmidt

28 November 2012 14	Werder Bremen	1–4	Bayer Leverkusen	Bremen
20:00	Ignjovski (yellow card) 48'; Petersen 54'; Junuzović (yellow card) 64'; Fritz (yellow card) 82'	Report (in German)	Castro 31', 52'; Carvajal (yellow card) 41'; Rolfes 74'; Hegeler 79'	Stadium: Weserstadion; Attendance: 37,231; Referee: Thorsten Kinhöfer

2 December 2012 15	1899 Hoffenheim	1–4	Werder Bremen	Sinsheim
15:30	Schipplock (yellow card) 10'; Schröck (yellow card) 21'; Salihović (yellow card) 43', (goal) 50'	Report (in German)	Prödl (yellow card) 9', (goal) 21'; Arnautović 29', 73', 79'	Stadium: Rhein-Neckar-Arena; Attendance: 23,500; Referee: Knut Kircher

8 December 2012 16	Eintracht Frankfurt	4–1	Werder Bremen	Frankfurt
18:30	Aigner (yellow card) 10', (goal) 63'; Zambrano (yellow card) 20'; Inui (yellow card) 40', (goal) 90'; Rode (yellow card) 41'; Meier 47'; Schwegler 62'	Report	Prödl (yellow card) 42'; Petersen 54'; Schmitz (yellow card) 74'	Stadium: Commerzbank-Arena; Attendance: 51,500; Referee: Deniz Aytekin

16 December 2012 17	Werder Bremen	1–1	1. FC Nürnberg	Nuremberg
17:30	Arnautović (yellow card) 45'; Petersen 88'	Report	Gebhart (yellow card) 50', (goal) 82'; Chandler (yellow card) 84'; Pinola (yellow card) 89'; Klose (yellow card) 90'	Stadium: Frankenstadion; Attendance: 38,553

19 January 2013 18	Werder Bremen	0–5	Borussia Dortmund	Bremen
		Report	Reus 19'; Götze 19'; Santana 48'; Lewandowski 81'; Błaszczykowski 85'	Stadium: Weserstadion; Attendance: 42,100

27 January 2013 19	Hamburger SV	3–2	Werder Bremen	Hamburg
	Son 23'; Aogo 46'; Rudņevs 52'	Report	Lukimya-Mulongoti 9'; Papastathopoulos 54'	Stadium: Imtech Arena; Attendance: 54,758

1 February 2013 20	Werder Bremen	2–0	Hannover 96	Bremen
	Petersen 85', 88'	Report		Stadium: Weserstadion; Attendance: 41,600

9 February 2013 21	VfB Stuttgart	1–4	Werder Bremen	Stuttgart
	Traoré 50'	Report	Ekici 34', 74'; Hunt 61'; De Bruyne 90+2'	Stadium: Mercedes-Benz Arena; Attendance: 41,200

16 February 2013 22	Werder Bremen	2–3	SC Freiburg	Bremen
	Petersen 39', 64'	Report	Kruse 36'; Caligiuri 54'; Ginter 71'	Stadium: Weserstadion; Attendance: 38,498

23 February 2013 23	FC Bayern Munich	6–1	Werder Bremen	Munich
	Robben 25'; Martínez 29'; Gebre Selassie 49' (o.g.); Gómez 51', 89'; Ribéry 86'	Report	De Bruyne 58'	Stadium: Allianz Arena; Attendance: 71,000

2 March 2013 24	Werder Bremen	0–1	FC Augsburg	Bremen
		Report	Werner 29'	Stadium: Weserstadion; Attendance: 39,211

9 March 2013 25	Borussia Mönchengladbach	1–1	Werder Bremen	Mönchengladbach
	Mlapa 72'	Report	Ignjovski 77'	Stadium: Borussia-Park; Attendance: 54,010

16 March 2013 26	Werder Bremen	2–2	Greuther Fürth	Bremen
	Hunt 47', 70'	Report	Fürstner 55'; Petsos 62'	Stadium: Weserstadion; Attendance: 39,789

30 March 2013 27	Mainz 05	1–1	Werder Bremen	Mainz
	Szalai 1'	Report	Hunt 69'	Stadium: Coface Arena; Attendance: 33,374

6 April 2013 28	Werder Bremen	0–2	Schalke 04	Bremen
		Report	Draxler 51'; Marica 69'	Stadium: Weserstadion; Attendance: 42,100

13 April 2013 29	Fortuna Düsseldorf	2–2	Werder Bremen	Düsseldorf
	Reisinger 7', 48'	Report	Junuzović 16'; Latka 70' (o.g.)	Stadium: Esprit Arena; Attendance: 54,000

20 April 2013 30	Werder Bremen	0–3	VfL Wolfsburg	Bremen
		Report	Arnold 13'; Olić 27'; Diego 66'	Stadium: Weserstadion; Attendance: 41,000

27 April 2013 31	Bayer Leverkusen	1–0	Werder Bremen	Leverkusen
	Kießling 35'	Report		Stadium: BayArena; Attendance: 30,210

4 May 2013 32	Werder Bremen	2–2	1899 Hoffenheim	Bremen
	Hunt 2'; De Bruyne 24'	Report	Schipplock 85', 90'	Stadium: Weserstadion; Attendance: 41,000

11 May 2013 33	Werder Bremen	1–1	Eintracht Frankfurt	Bremen
	De Bruyne 22'	Report	Lakić 51'	Stadium: Weserstadion; Attendance: 42,100

18 May 2013 34	1. FC Nürnberg	3–2	Werder Bremen	Nuremberg
	Nilsson 61'; Polter 81'; Pekhart 88'	Report	De Bruyne 37', 89'	Stadium: Stadion Nürnberg; Attendance: 46,157

=== DFB-Pokal ===
19 August 2012 1st Round	Preußen Münster	4–2 (a.e.t.)	Werder Bremen	Münster
16:00	Taylor 54', 81', 118'; Nazarov 96'	Report	Elia 45'; Füllkrug 67'	Stadium: Preußenstadion; Attendance: 18,000; Referee: Peter Sippel

== Squad ==
=== Squad and statistics ===
Sources: As of 31 June 2013

No.	Pos	Nat	Player	Total		Bundesliga		DFB-Pokal	
No.	Pos	Nat	Player	Apps	Goals	Apps	Goals	Apps	Goals
1	GK	(Germany) GER	Sebastian Mielitz	35	0	34	0	1	0
20	GK	(Germany) GER	Raphael Wolf	0	0	0	0	0	0
30	GK	(Austria) AUT	Richard Strebinger	0	0	0	0	0	0
33	GK	(Germany) GER	Christian Vander	0	0	0	0	0	0
3	DF	(Switzerland) SUI	François Affolter	0	0	0	0	0	0
5	DF	(Democratic Republic of the Congo) COD	Assani Lukimya-Mulongoti	22	1	17+5	1	0	0
13	DF	(Germany) GER	Lukas Schmitz	23	0	20+3	0	0	0
15	DF	(Austria) AUT	Sebastian Prödl	29	1	23+5	1	1	0
22	DF	(Greece) GRE	Sokratis Papastathopoulos	30	1	29	1	1	0
23	DF	(Czech Republic) CZE	Theodor Gebre Selassie	28	1	24+3	1	1	0
26	DF	(Germany) GER	Florian Hartherz	0	0	0	0	0	0
29	DF	(Germany) GER	Cimo Röcker	0	0	0	0	0	0
6	MF	(Belgium) BEL	Kevin De Bruyne	34	10	33	10	1	0
8	MF	(Germany) GER	Clemens Fritz	23	0	18+4	0	1	0
10	MF	(Turkey) TUR	Mehmet Ekici	9	2	6+3	2	0	0
14	MF	(Germany) GER	Aaron Hunt	29	11	26+2	11	1	0
16	MF	(Austria) AUT	Zlatko Junuzović	30	3	28+2	3	0	0
17	MF	(Serbia) SRB	Aleksandar Ignjovski	21	1	17+3	1	1	0
18	MF	(Germany) GER	Felix Kroos	5	0	5	0	0	0
25	MF	(Germany) GER	Tom Trybull	4	0	4	0	0	0
28	MF	(Germany) GER	Levent Ayçiçek	0	0	0	0	0	0
31	MF	(Serbia) SRB	Predrag Stevanović	0	0	0	0	0	0
32	MF	(Germany) GER	Özkan Yıldırım	8	0	3+5	0	0	0
34	MF	(Germany) GER	Aleksandar Stevanović	2	0	0+2	0	0	0
44	MF	(Germany) GER	Philipp Bargfrede	14	0	7+6	0	0+1	0
7	FW	(Austria) AUT	Marko Arnautović	27	5	21+5	5	0+1	0
11	FW	(Netherlands) NED	Eljero Elia	25	1	22+2	0	1	1
19	FW	(Nigeria) NGR	Joseph Akpala	21	1	3+18	1	0	0
24	FW	(Germany) GER	Nils Petersen	35	11	30+4	11	1	0
27	FW	(Germany) GER	Johannes Wurtz	2	0	0+2	0	0	0
41	FW	(Germany) GER	Niclas Füllkrug	13	1	1+11	1	0+1	0

== Kits ==
Home	Home Alternate	Away	Third
