= 2013–14 SV Werder Bremen season =

Werder Bremen
2013–14 season
- Manager: Robin Dutt
- Stadium: Weserstadion
- Bundesliga: 12th
- DFB-Pokal: Round 1
Home colours	Away colours	Third colours

The 2013–14 SV Werder Bremen season is the 104th season in the club's history. In 2013–14, the club participated in the Bundesliga, the top tier of German football. It is the club's 32nd consecutive season in this league, having been promoted from the 2. Bundesliga in 1981.

The club also took part in the 2013–14 edition of the DFB-Pokal.

== Matches ==
=== Legend ===
Win Draw Loss Postponed

=== Bundesliga ===
==== League results and fixtures ====
10 August 1	Eintracht Braunschweig	0–1	Werder Bremen	Braunschweig
18:30 CEST	Theuerkauf (yellow card) 77'	Report	Junuzović 82'	Stadium: Eintracht-Stadion; Attendance: 23,000; Referee: Deniz Aytekin

17 August 2013 2	Werder Bremen	1–0	FC Augsburg	Bremen
15:30 CEST	Ekici 22', (yellow card) 50'; Prödl (yellow card) 28'; Lukimya (yellow card) 41'	Report	Verhaegh (yellow card) 42'; Morávek (yellow card) 58'; Hanhn (yellow card) 77'; Callsen-Bracker (yellow card) 89'	Stadium: Weserstadion; Attendance: 40,112; Referee: Daniel Siebert

23 August 2013 3	Borussia Dortmund	1–0	Werder Bremen	Dortmund
20:30 CEST	Lewandowski 55'	Report		Stadium: Signal Iduna Park; Attendance: 80,645; Referee: Felix Zwayer

31 August 2013 4	Borussia Mönchengladbach	4–1	Werder Bremen	Mönchengladbach
15:30 CEST	Jantschke (yellow card) 29'; Arango 36'; Xhaka (yellow card) 45+1'; Raffael 53'; Kruse 74'; Kramer (yellow card) 77'; Herrmann 85'	Report	Nordtveit 69' (o.g.)	Stadium: Borussia-Park; Attendance: 53,392; Referee: Günter Perl

14 September 2013 5	Werder Bremen	0–3	Eintracht Frankfurt	Bremen
15:30 CEST	Di Santo (red card) 26'; Caldirola (yellow card) 33'; Makiadi (yellow card) 64'	Report	Kadlec 14', 34'; Prödl 77' (o.g.)	Stadium: Weserstadion; Attendance: 40,060; Referee: Felix Brych

21 September 2013 6	Hamburger SV	0–2	Werder Bremen	Hamburg
15:30 CEST	Beister (yellow card) 29'; Van der Vaart (yellow card) 63'	Report	Petersen 32', 90+4', (yellow card) 90+5'; Fritz (yellow card) 40'; Ignjovski (yellow card) 55'; García (yellow card) 90+4'	Stadium: Volksparkstadion; Attendance: 53,290; Referee: Wolfgang Stark

29 September 2013 7	Werder Bremen	3–3	1. FC Nürnberg	Bremen
15:30 CEST	Dabanlı 8' (o.g.); Elia 34', 66'; Junuzović (yellow card) 42'; Ekici (yellow card) 78'	Report	Chandler (yellow card) 31'; Kiyotake 44'; Stark (yellow card) 45+1'; Drmić 53'; Hloušek 70'	Stadium: Weserstadion; Attendance: 40,048; Referee: Tobias Stieler

5 October 2013 8	VfB Stuttgart	1–1	Werder Bremen	Stuttgart
15:30 CEST	Harnik 6'; Ibišević (yellow card) 13'	Report	Ekici (yellow card) 34'; Petersen 37'; García (yellow card) 90+1'	Stadium: Mercedes-Benz Arena; Attendance: 50,410; Referee: Peter Sippel

19 October 2013 9	Werder Bremen	0–0	SC Freiburg	Bremen
15:30 CEST	García (yellow card) 68'	Report	Höfler (yellow card) 30'; Diagne (yellow card) 67'	Stadium: Weserstadion; Attendance: 40,43; Referee: Florian Meyer

26 October 2013 10	VfL Wolfsburg	3–0	Werder Bremen	Wolfsburg
18:30 CEST	Arnold 7'; Luiz Gustavo (yellow card) 19'; Olić 72'; Perišić 89'	Report	Kroos (yellow card) 38'	Stadium: Volkswagen Arena; Attendance: 29,488; Referee: Deniz Aytekin

3 November 2013 11	Werder Bremen	3–2	Hannover 96	Bremen
17:30 CET	Fritz (yellow card) 19'; Hunt 25' (pen.), (yellow card) 90+3'; Makiadi 39'; García 86', (yellow card) 86'	Report	Huszti 20' (pen.), (yellow card) 66'; Sané (yellow card) 25'; Sakai 41'; Pocognoli (yellow card) 52'; Kadah (yellow card) 84'	Stadium: Weserstadion; Attendance: 40,435; Referee: Thorsten Kinhöfer

9 November 2013 12	Schalke 04	3–1	Werder Bremen	Gelsenkirchen
15:30 CET	Jones (yellow card) 17'; Boateng 64', 85'; Draxler (yellow card) 69'; Farfán 90+1'	Report	Kroos 22'; Gebre Selassie (yellow card) 35'; García (yellow card) 36'; Schmitz (yellow card) 59'; Caldirola (yellow card) 60'	Stadium: Veltins-Arena; Attendance: 61,973; Referee: Felix Brych

24 November 2013 13	Werder Bremen	2–3	Mainz 05	Bremen
17:30 CET	Kroos (yellow card) 13'; Elia 85'; Di Santo 90'	Report	Müller 7', (yellow card) 75'; Okazaki 17', 70'; Soto (yellow card) 43'	Stadium: Weserstadion; Attendance: 38,429; Referee: Peter Sippel

30 November 2013 14	1899 Hoffenheim	4–4	Werder Bremen	Sinsheim
15:30 CET	Salihović 12' (pen.), 18' (pen.), (yellow card) 77'; Schipplock (yellow card) 44'; Volland 49'; Herdling 53'	Report	Elia (yellow card) 14', (goal) 45+1'; Fritz (yellow card) 20'; Makiadi (yellow card) 31'; Hunt 45' (pen.); Petersen 59', (yellow card) 60'; Ekici (yellow card) 62'; Bargfrede 90+1'	Stadium: Rhein-Neckar Arena; Attendance: 25,608; Referee: Wolfgang Stark

7 December 2013 15	Werder Bremen	0–7	Bayern Munich	Bremen
15:30 CET	Caldirola (yellow card) 39'; Makiadi (yellow card) 45'; Di Santo (yellow card) 58'; Lukimya (yellow card) 76'	Report	Lukimya 21' (o.g.); Van Buyten 27', (yellow card) 66'; Boateng (yellow card) 32'; Ribéry 38', 82'; Mandžukić 60'; Müller 68'; Götze 90'	Stadium: Weserstadion; Attendance: 42,100; Referee: Marco Fritz

13 December 2013 16	Hertha BSC	3–2	Werder Bremen	Berlin
20:30 CET	Ramos 17' (pen.), 26'; Ronny 48'; Ciğerci (yellow card) 66'	Report	Petersen 15'; Gebre Selassie (yellow card) 17'; Hunt 32'; García (yellow card) 51'	Stadium: Olympiastadion; Attendance: 48,721; Referee: Christian Dingert

21 December 2013 17	Werder Bremen	1–0	Bayer Leverkusen	Bremen
15:30 CET	Bargfrede (yellow card) 54'; García 74'; Elia (yellow card) 68'	Report	Kruse (yellow card) 42'; Toprak (yellow card) 42'; Wollscheid (yellow card) 90'	Stadium: Weserstadion; Attendance: 39,145; Referee: Robert Hartmann

26 January 2014 18	Werder Bremen	0–0	Eintracht Braunschweig	Bremen
15:30 CET	García (yellow card) 32'; Kroos (yellow card) 35'	Report	Pfitzner (yellow card) 31'; Theuerkauf (yellow card) 75'	Stadium: Weserstadion; Attendance: 41,040; Referee: Felix Brych

1 February 2014 19	FC Augsburg	3–1	Werder Bremen	Augsburg
15:30 CET	Werner 11'; Altıntop 49'; Hahn 55'; Kohr (yellow card) 89'	Report	Callsen-Bracker 3' (o.g.); Kroos (yellow card) 4'; García (yellow card) 18' (yellow-red card) 45+2'; Di Santo (yellow card) 46'; Caldirola (yellow card) 74'	Stadium: SGL Arena; Attendance: 28,313; Referee: Christian Dingert

8 February 2014 20	Werder Bremen	1–5	Borussia Dortmund	Bremen
15:30 CET	Di Santo (yellow card) 13'; Kobylański (yellow card) 70'; Ayçiçek 89'	Report	Friedrich (yellow card) 25', (goal) 48'; Lewandowski 26', 85'; Mkhitaryan 41', 62'; Papastathopoulos (yellow card) 69'	Stadium: Weserstadion; Attendance: 42,100; Referee: Günter Perl

15 February 2014 21	Werder Bremen	1–1	Borussia Mönchengladbach	Bremen
15:30 CET	Obraniak (yellow card) 16', (goal) 88'; Bargfrede (yellow card) 29'; Ignjovski (yellow card) 80'	Report	Raffael 6'; Hrgota (yellow card) 83'	Stadium: Weserstadion; Attendance: 42,100; Referee: Wolfgang Stark

23 February 2014 22	Eintracht Frankfurt	0–0	Werder Bremen	Frankfurt
15:30 CET	Schwegler (yellow card) 20'	Report	Kroos (yellow card) 30' (yellow-red card) 34'; Caldirola (yellow card) 60'; Prödl (yellow card) 73'; Bargfrede (yellow card) 90+2'	Stadium: Commerzbank-Arena; Attendance: 44,300; Referee: Felix Zwayer

1 March 2014 23	Werder Bremen	1–0	Hamburger SV	Bremen
15:30 CET	Junuzović 19', (yellow card) 53'; Di Santo (yellow card) 34'	Report	Lasogga (yellow card) 29'; Çalhanoğlu (yellow card) 40'	Stadium: Weserstadion; Attendance: 42,100; Referee: Florian Meyer

8 March 2014 24	1. FC Nürnberg	0–2	Werder Bremen	Nuremberg
18:30 CET	Angha (yellow card) 53'; Hloušek (yellow card) 66'; Campaña (yellow card) 74'	Report	Bargfrede (yellow card) 33', (goal) 68'; Obraniak (yellow card) 34'; Junuzović (yellow card) 45+1'; Caldirola (yellow card) 83'	Stadium: Stadion Nürnberg; Attendance: 40,608; Referee: Manuel Gräfe

15 March 2014 25	Werder Bremen	1–1	VfB Stuttgart	Bremen
15:30 CET	Lukimya (yellow card) 45'; Hunt 79'; Caldirola (yellow card) 84'	Report	Harnik (yellow card) 23'; Niedermeier (yellow card) 27', (goal) 55'; Schwaab (yellow card) 63'	Stadium: Weserstadion; Attendance: 41,500; Referee: Thorsten Kinhöfer

21 March 2014 26	SC Freiburg	3–1	SV Werder Bremen	Freiburg im Breisgau
20:30 CET	Schuster 15'; Klaus 53', (yellow card) 66'; Mehmedi 59'	Report	Bargfrede (yellow card) 26'; Petersen 70'; Hunt (yellow card) 74'	Stadium: Mage Solar Stadion; Attendance: 24,000; Referee: Michael Weiner

25 March 2014 27	Werder Bremen	1–3	VfL Wolfsburg	Bremen
20:00 CET	Prödl 16'; Fritz (yellow card) 86'; Junuzović (yellow card) 89'	Report	Malanda 2'; Perišić 10', (yellow card) 37'; Arnold 80'	Stadium: Weserstadion; Attendance: 37,270; Referee: Daniel Siebert

30 March 2014 28	Hannover 96	1–2	SV Werder Bremen	Hanover
17:30 CET	Huszti 43'; Stindl (yellow card) 83'	Report	Di Santo 57'; Prödl (yellow card) 60', (goal) 90'	Stadium: HDI-Arena; Attendance: 49,000; Referee: Markus Schmidt

5 April 2014 29	Werder Bremen	1–1	Schalke 04	Bremen
15:30 CEST	Di Santo 15', (yellow card) 27'	Report	Goretzka 33'; Ayhan (yellow card) 43'; Hoogland (yellow card) 77'	Stadium: Weserstadion; Attendance: 42,100; Referee: Peter Sippel

12 April 2014 30	Mainz 05	3–0	Werder Bremen	Mainz
15:30 CEST	Petersen 5' (o.g.); Moritz 16'; Mallı 39'	Report	Elia (yellow card) 11'; Junuzović (yellow card) 20'; Prödl (yellow card) 64'; Bargfrede (yellow card) 75'	Stadium: Coface Arena; Attendance: 33,597; Referee: Deniz Aytekin

19 April 2014 31	Werder Bremen	3–1	1899 Hoffenheim	Bremen
15:30 CEST	Bargfrede 18'; García 78', (yellow card) 85'; Petersen 90+2'	Report	Volland 3'; Rudy (yellow card) 37'; Elyounoussi (yellow card) 44'; Grahl (yellow card) 79'	Stadium: Weserstadion; Attendance: 40,100; Referee: Bastian Dankert

26 April 2014 32	Bayern Munich	5–2	Werder Bremen	Munich
15:30 CEST	Ribéry 20'; Müller (yellow card) 38'; Pizarro 53', 57'; Schweinsteiger 61'; Robben 74'	Report	Gebre Selassie 10'; Hunt 36'; Caldirola (yellow card) 76'	Stadium: Allianz Arena; Attendance: 71,000; Referee: Guido Winkmann

3 May 2014 33	Werder Bremen	2–0	Hertha BSC	Bremen
15:30 CEST	Di Santo (yellow card) 4'; Hunt 49', 90+1'; García (yellow card) 61'; Elia (yellow card) 67'	Report	Brooks (yellow card) 55'	Stadium: Weserstadion; Attendance: 42,100; Referee: Robert Hartmann

10 May 2014 34	Bayer Leverkusen	2–1	Werder Bremen	Leverkusen
15:30 CEST	Castro (yellow card) 11'; Spahić (yellow card) 29'; Toprak 33'; Son 53'	Report	Gebre Selassie 21'	Stadium: BayArena; Attendance: 30,210; Referee: Knut Kircher

==== League table ====
Pos	Team	Pld	W	D	L	GF	GA	GD	Pts
10	Hannover 96	34	12	6	16	46	59	−13	42
11	Hertha BSC	34	11	8	15	40	48	−8	41
12	Werder Bremen	34	10	9	15	42	66	−24	39
13	Eintracht Frankfurt	34	9	9	16	40	57	−17	36
14	SC Freiburg	34	9	9	16	43	61	−18	36

Source: DFB
Rules for classification: 1) points; 2) goal difference; 3) number of goals scored.

==== DFB-Pokal ====
4 August 2013 1st Round	1. FC Saarbrücken	3–1 (a.e.t.)	Werder Bremen	Saarbrücken
20:30 CEST	Eggert (yellow card) 14'; Fischer 45', (yellow card) 47'; Stegerer 105'; Ziemer 112'; Kreuels (yellow card) 113'; Pellowski (yellow card) 114'	Report	Prödl 59', (yellow card) 69'; Fritz (yellow card) 90'; Yıldırım (yellow card) 94'; Arnautović (yellow card) 116'	Stadium: Ludwigsparkstadion; Attendance: 15,424

== Statistics ==
No.	Pos	Nat	Player	Total		Bundesliga		DFB-Pokal	
No.	Pos	Nat	Player	Apps	Goals	Apps	Goals	Apps	Goals
1	GK	(Germany) GER	Sebastian Mielitz	14	0	13	0	1	0
2	DF	(Argentina) ARG	Santiago García	23	0	22	0	1	0
3	DF	(Italy) ITA	Luca Caldirola	33	0	33	0	0	0
5	DF	(Democratic Republic of the Congo) COD	Assani Lukimya-Mulongoti	23	0	23	0	0	0
6	MF	(Democratic Republic of the Congo) COD	Cédric Makiadi	34	1	33	1	1	0
7	FW	(Serbia) SRB	Ludovic Obraniak	10	1	10	1	0	0
8	MF	(Germany) GER	Clemens Fritz	23	0	22	0	1	0
9	FW	(Argentina) ARG	Franco Di Santo	23	4	23	4	0	0
10	FW	(Turkey) TUR	Mehmet Ekici	12	1	11	1	1	0
11	FW	(Netherlands) NED	Eljero Elia	33	4	33	4	0	0
13	DF	(Germany) GER	Lukas Schmitz	3	0	3	0	0	0
14	MF	(Germany) GER	Aaron Hunt	32	7	31	7	1	0
15	DF	(Austria) AUT	Sebastian Prödl	28	3	27	2	1	1
16	MF	(Serbia) SRB	Zlatko Junuzovic	27	2	26	2	1	0
17	DF	(Austria) AUT	Aleksandar Ignjovski	14	0	14	0	0	0
18	MF	(Germany) GER	Felix Kroos	20	1	20	1	0	0
20	GK	(Germany) GER	Raphael Wolf	21	0	21	0	0	0
22	MF	(Uganda) UGA	Melvyn Lorenzen	2	0	2	0	0	0
23	FW	(Czech Republic) CZE	Theodor Gebre Selassie	30	2	29	2	1	0
24	FW	(Germany) GER	Nils Petersen	29	7	28	7	1	0
25	MF	(Germany) GER	Luca Zander	1	0	0	0	1	0
26	MF	(Germany) GER	Julian von Haacke	0	0	0	0	0	0
27	FW	(Germany) GER	David Selke	3	0	3	0	0	0
28	MF	(Germany) GER	Levent Ayçiçek	2	1	2	1	0	0
29	MF	(Turkey) TUR	Cimo Röcker	1	0	0	0	1	0
32	DF	(Turkey) TUR	Özkan Yıldırım	11	0	10	0	1	0
Players are no longer at the club
7	FW	(Austria) AUT	Marko Arnautović	2	0	2	0	0	0
