= 2014–15 SV Werder Bremen season =

Werder Bremen
2014–15 season
- Manager: Victor Skripnik
- Stadium: Weserstadion
- Bundesliga: 10th
- DFB-Pokal: Round 3
Home colours	Away colours	Third colours

The 2014–15 SV Werder Bremen season is the 105th season in the club's football history. In 2014–15 the club plays in the Bundesliga, the top tier of German football. It is the clubs thirty-second consecutive season in this league, having been promoted from the 2. Bundesliga in 1981.

The club also took part in the 2014–15 edition of the DFB-Pokal.

== Competitions ==
=== Bundesliga ===
==== League table ====
Pos	Team	Pld	W	D	L	GF	GA	GD	Pts
8	1899 Hoffenheim	34	12	8	14	49	55	−6	44
9	Eintracht Frankfurt	34	11	10	13	56	62	−6	43
10	Werder Bremen	34	11	10	13	50	65	−15	43
11	Mainz 05	34	9	13	12	45	47	−2	40
12	1. FC Köln	34	9	13	12	34	40	−6	40

Source: DFB
Rules for classification: 1) points; 2) goal difference; 3) number of goals scored

==== Results summary ====
Overall								Home						Away					
Pld	W	D	L	GF	GA	GD	Pts	W	D	L	GF	GA	GD	W	D	L	GF	GA	GD
32	11	10	11	48	60	−12	43	8	4	4	25	22	+3	3	6	7	23	38	−15

Last updated: 9 May 2015.
Source: Competitive matches

==== Results by round ====
Round	1	2	3	4	5	6	7	8	9	10	11	12	13	14	15	16	17	18	19	20	21	22	23	24	25	26	27	28	29	30	31	32	33	34
Ground	A	H	A	A	H	A	H	A	H	A	H	A	H	A	H	A	H	H	A	H	H	A	H	A	H	A	H	A	H	A	H	A	H	A
Result	D	D	D	L	L	L	D	L	L	W	W	L	W	L	D	L	W	W	W	W	W	D	L	W	L	D	D	L	W	D	W	D	L	L
Position	6	9	11	13	16	17	18	18	18	18	16	17	14	17	17	18	16	12	11	8	8	8	9	8	9	9	9	9	7	9	7	8	8	10

Updated to match(es) played on 4 August 2015. Source: Competitive matches
A = Away; H = Home; W = Win; D = Draw; L = Loss

==== Matches ====
Win Draw Lose

23 August 2014 1	Hertha BSC	2–2	Werder Bremen	Berlin
15:30 CEST (UTC+02:00)	Schieber 16', 47'; Wagner (yellow card) 77'	Report	García (yellow card) 52'; Lukimya-Mulongoti 53'; Di Santo 55'; Junuzović (yellow card) 90+2'	Stadium: Olympiastadion; Attendance: 59,672; Referee: Thorsten Kinhöfer

30 August 2014 2	Werder Bremen	1–1	1899 Hoffenheim	Bremen
15:30 CEST (UTC+02:00)	Selke (yellow card) 2'; Junuzović (yellow card) 36'; Gálvez 59', (yellow card) 60'	Report	Firmino 19'	Stadium: Weserstadion; Attendance: 38,900; Referee: Robert Hartmann

12 September 2014 3	Bayer Leverkusen	3–3	Werder Bremen	Leverkusen
20:30 CEST (UTC+02:00)	Jedvaj 17'; Spahić (yellow card) 48'; Çalhanoğlu (yellow card) 52', (goal) 63'; Castro (yellow card) 67'; Son 73'; Reinartz (yellow card) 77'	Report	Bartels 45'; Di Santo 60'; Gálvez (yellow card) 77'; Prödl 84' (yellow card) 89'	Stadium: BayArena; Attendance: 30,210; Referee: Christian Dingert

20 September 2014 4	FC Augsburg	4–2	Werder Bremen	Augsburg
15:30 CEST (UTC+02:00)	Baier 14'; Kohr (yellow card) 15'; Verhaegh 45+3' (pen.); Werner 77'; Matavž 90+3'	Report	Selke 3'; García (yellow card) 36'; Elia (yellow card) 40'; Bartels (yellow card) 45+2'; Di Santo 56' (pen.), (yellow card) 88'	Stadium: SGL arena Attendance: 29,044; Referee: Marco Fritz

23 September 2014 5	Werder Bremen	0–3	Schalke 04	Bremen
20:00 CEST (UTC+02:00)	Di Santo (yellow card) 25'; Selke (yellow card) 36'; García (yellow card) 77'; Junuzović (yellow card) 90'	Report	Huntelaar (yellow card) 16'; Höger (yellow card) 21'; Meyer 48'; Neustädter 51'; Aogo (yellow card) 61'; Barnetta 85'	Stadium: Weserstadion; Attendance: 40,139; Referee: Wolfgang Stark

27 September 2014 6	VfL Wolfsburg	2–1	Werder Bremen	Wolfsburg
18:30 CEST (UTC+02:00)	Rodríguez 15'; Olić 57'	Report	Busch 37'	Stadium: Volkswagen Arena; Attendance: 29,117; Referee: Peter Sippel

4 October 2014 7	Werder Bremen	1–1	SC Freiburg	Bremen
15:30 CEST (UTC+02:00)	Di Santo 31'	Report	Darida 8' (pen.), (yellow card) 70'	Stadium: Weserstadion; Attendance: 40,029; Referee: Knut Kircher

18 October 2014 8	Bayern Munich	6–0	Werder Bremen	Munich
15:30 CEST (UTC+02:00)	Lahm 20', 79'; Alonso 27'; Müller 43' (pen.); Götze 45', 86'	Report	Gálvez (yellow card) 75'	Stadium: Allianz Arena; Attendance: 71,000; Referee: Bastian Dankert

24 October 2014 9	Werder Bremen	0–1	1. FC Köln	Bremen
20:30 CEST (UTC+02:00)	Caldirola (yellow card) 21'; Junuzović (yellow card) 37'; García (yellow card) 86'	Report	Ujah 59'	Stadium: Weserstadion; Attendance: 42,100; Referee: Felix Brych

1 November 2014 10	FSV Mainz 05	1–2	Werder Bremen	Mainz
15:30 CET (UTC+01:00)	Okazaki 3'; Karius (yellow card) 43'; Geis (yellow card) 44'; Mallı (yellow card) 72'; Đuričić (yellow card) 74'	Report	Kroos (yellow card) 18'; Gálvez (yellow card) 21'; Di Santo 44', 49'; Wolf (yellow card) 69'	Stadium: Coface Arena; Attendance: 31,017; Referee: Wolfgang Stark

8 November 2014 11	Werder Bremen	2–0	VfB Stuttgart	Bremen
18:30 CET (UTC+01:00)	Prödl 30'; Bartels 57'; Obraniak (yellow card) 90+2'	Report	Romeu (yellow card) 31'	Stadium: Weserstadion; Attendance: 40,284; Referee: Guido Winkmann

23 November 2014 12	Hamburger SV	2–0	Werder Bremen	Hamburg
15:30 CET (UTC+01:00)	Diekmeier (yellow card) 32'; Westermann (yellow card) 37'; Van der Vaart (yellow card) 62'; Ostrzolek (yellow card) 80'; Rudņevs 84'; Wolf 90+3' (o.g.)	Report	García (yellow card) 20'; Fritz (yellow card) 72' (yellow-red card) 89'; Makiadi (yellow card) 89'; Bartels (yellow card) 90+5'	Stadium: Imtech Arena; Attendance: 57,000; Referee: Felix Zwayer

29 November 2014 13	Werder Bremen	4–0	SC Paderborn 07	Bremen
15:30 CET (UTC+01:00)	Junuzović 10'; Selke 48'; Bartels 50'; Gálvez (yellow card) 69'; Ayçiçek 80'; Prödl (yellow card) 88'	Report	Ziegler (yellow card) 32'	Stadium: Weserstadion; Attendance: 41,800; Referee: Knut Kircher

7 December 2014 14	Eintracht Frankfurt	5–2	Werder Bremen	Frankfurt
17:30 CET (UTC+01:00)	Inui (yellow card) 31'; Meier 34', 68'; Seferovic 52'; Aigner 76'; Stendera 80'; Chandler (yellow card) 85'	Report	Prödl (yellow card) 21'; Gebre Selassie 45'; Caldirola 79'; Fritz (yellow card) 90+1'	Stadium: Commerzbank-Arena; Attendance: 46,800; Referee: Christian Dingert

13 December 2014 15	Werder Bremen	3–3	Hannover 96	Bremen
15:30 CET (UTC+01:00)	Kroos (yellow card) 20'; Junuzović 36'; Lorenzen 55'; Caldirola (yellow card) 68'; Selke 88'; Bartels (yellow card) 90+2'	Report	Stindl 12'; Sakai (yellow card) 35'; Joselu 62'; Kiyotake 64'; Schmiedebach (yellow card) 65'; Gülselam (yellow card) 83'	Stadium: Weserstadion; Attendance: 40,932; Referee: Tobias Welz

17 December 2014 16	Borussia Mönchengladbach	4–1	Werder Bremen	Mönchengladbach
20:00 CET (UTC+01:00)	Kruse 32' (pen.); Brouwers (yellow card) 37'; Wendt 38'; Kramer 64'; Hrgota 88'	Report	Junuzović 51'; Caldirola (yellow card) 63' (yellow-red card) 66'; Fritz (yellow card) 69'	Stadium: Borussia-Park; Attendance: 44,513; Referee: Robert Hartmann

20 December 2014 17	Werder Bremen	2–1	Borussia Dortmund	Bremen
15:30 CET (UTC+01:00)	Selke 3'; Bartels 62'	Report	Hummels 69'	Stadium: Weserstadion; Attendance: 42,100; Referee: Manuel Gräfe

1 February 2015 18	Werder Bremen	2–0	Hertha BSC	Bremen
15:30 CET (UTC+01:00)	Selke (yellow card) 13'; Gálvez (yellow card) 37'; Di Santo 43', 69'; Sternberg (yellow card) 55'; Junuzović (yellow card) 61'	Report	Niemeyer (yellow card) 31'; Hegeler (yellow card) 39'; Van den Bergh (yellow card) 48'	Stadium: Weserstadion; Attendance: 40,187; Referee: Felix Brych

4 February 2015 19	1899 Hoffenheim	1–2	Werder Bremen	Sinsheim
19:00 CET (UTC+01:00)	Bičakčić 34'; Rudy (yellow card) 82'	Report	Di Santo 8' (yellow card) 72'; Kroos (yellow card) 47'; Bargfrede 52'; García (yellow card) 65'; Bartels (yellow card) 90+3'	Stadium: Rhein-Neckar Arena; Attendance: 23,631; Referee: Guido Winkmann

8 February 2015 20	Werder Bremen	2–1	Bayer Leverkusen	Bremen
15:30 CET (UTC+01:00)	Selke 17'; Junuzović 29'; Fritz (yellow card) 53'	Report	Toprak (yellow card) 28'; Castro (yellow card) 33'; Çalhanoğlu 43'; Wendell (yellow card) 78'	Stadium: Weserstadion; Attendance: 39,653; Referee: Peter Sippel

14 February 2015 21	Werder Bremen	3–2	FC Augsburg	Bremen
15:30 CET (UTC+01:00)	Lukimya 16'; Di Santo 23', (yellow card) 26'; Gebre Selassie 45'; Ayçiçek (yellow card) 72'	Report	Klavan 21'; Bobadilla (yellow card) 25'; Werner 79'; Feulner (yellow card) 90+4'	Stadium: Weserstadion; Attendance: 39,746; Referee: Christian Dingert

21 February 2015 22	Schalke 04	1–1	Werder Bremen	Gelsenkirchen
15:30 CET (UTC+01:00)	Nastasić (yellow card) 48'; Meyer 61'	Report	García (yellow card) 82'; Bartels (yellow card) 84'; Prödl 90+2'	Stadium: Veltins-Arena; Attendance: 61,973; Referee: Manuel Gräfe

1 March 2015 23	Werder Bremen	3–5	VfL Wolfsburg	Bremen
15:30 CET (UTC+01:00)	Junuzović 9'; Di Santo 16'; Vieirinha 28' (o.g.); Kroos (yellow card) 69'; Vestergaard (yellow card) 79'	Report	Caligiuri 10', 53'; Arnold 18'; Dost 48', 51'; Guilavogui (yellow card) 58'	Stadium: Weserstadion; Attendance: 40,126; Referee: Marco Fritz

7 March 2015 24	SC Freiburg	0–1	Werder Bremen	Freiburg im Breisgau
15:30 CET (UTC+01:00)	Schuster (yellow card) 28'; Frantz (yellow card) 60'	Report	Di Santo (yellow card) 17', (goal) 35'	Stadium: Dreisamstadion; Attendance: 24,000; Referee: Deniz Aytekin

14 March 2015 25	Werder Bremen	0–4	Bayern Munich	Bremen
15:30 CET (UTC+01:00)	Prödl (yellow card) 62'; Junuzović (yellow card) 66'; García (yellow card) 67'	Report	Müller 24'; Rafinha (yellow card) 29'; Alaba 45'; Benatia (yellow card) 62'; Boateng (yellow card) 67'; Lewandowski 76', 90+1'	Stadium: Weserstadion; Attendance: 42,100; Referee: Thorsten Kinhöfer

21 March 2015 26	1. FC Köln	1–1	Werder Bremen	Cologne
15:30 CET (UTC+01:00)	Deyverson (yellow card) 73'; Lehmann (yellow card) 84', (goal) 88' (pen.)	Report	Selke 27'; Di Santo (yellow card) 71'; Fritz (yellow card) 82'	Stadium: RheinEnergieStadion; Attendance: 50,000; Referee: Robert Hartmann

4 April 2015 27	Werder Bremen	0–0	FSV Mainz 05	Bremen
15:30 CEST (UTC+02:00)	Di Santo (yellow card) 15'; Vestergaard (yellow card) 29'; Prödl (yellow card) 58'; Bargfrede (yellow card) 87'	Report	Baumgartlinger (yellow card) 68'; Bungert (yellow card) 79'	Stadium: Weserstadion; Attendance: 41,000; Referee: Michael Weiner

12 April 2015 28	VfB Stuttgart	3–2	Werder Bremen	Stuttgart
17:30 CEST (UTC+02:00)	Gentner 15'; Rüdiger (yellow card) 16'; Ginczek 70', 90+1'; Harnik (yellow card) 73' (yellow-red card) 84'	Report	Di Santo (yellow card) 16'; Selke 50', (yellow card) 90'; Bargfrede (yellow card) 52'; Vestergaard 86'	Stadium: Mercedes-Benz Arena; Attendance: 51,400; Referee: Günter Perl

19 April 2015 29	Werder Bremen	1–0	Hamburger SV	Bremen
15:30 CEST (UTC+02:00)	Di Santo 84' (pen.); Öztunalı (yellow card) 90+4'	Report	Westermann (yellow card) 36'; Behrami (red card) 82'; Müller (yellow card) 84'; Holtby (yellow card) 90+2'	Stadium: Weserstadion; Attendance: 42,100; Referee: Wolfgang Stark

26 April 2015 30	SC Paderborn 07	2–2	Werder Bremen	Paderborn
15:30 CEST (UTC+02:00)	Vrančić 25', (yellow card) 72'; Stoppelkamp 27'; Heinloth (yellow card) 33' (yellow-red card) 78'	Report	Bargfrede (yellow card) 35'; Selke 45'; Hajrović 75'	Stadium: Benteler Arena; Attendance: 15,000; Referee: Florian Meyer

2 May 2015 31	Werder Bremen	1–0	Eintracht Frankfurt	Bremen
15:30 CEST (UTC+02:00)	Lukimya-Mulongoti (yellow card) 52'; Selke 66'; Sternberg (yellow card) 71'	Report	Stendera (yellow card) 39'; Inui (yellow card) 65'	Stadium: Weserstadion; Attendance: 42,100; Referee: Robert Hartmann

9 May 2015 32	Hannover 96	1–1	Werder Bremen	Hanover
15:30 CEST (UTC+02:00)	Stindl 21', (yellow card) 89'; Marcelo (yellow card) 34'; Briand (yellow card) 55'; Sané (yellow card) 85'	Report	Vestergaard (yellow card) 65'; Junuzović 78'	Stadium: Niedersachsenstadion; Attendance: 49,000; Referee: Deniz Aytekin

16 May 2015 33	Werder Bremen	0–2	Borussia Mönchengladbach	Bremen
15:30 CEST (UTC+02:00)		Report	Jantschke (yellow card) 31'; Raffael 53', 85'	Stadium: Weserstadion; Attendance: 42,100; Referee: Christian Dingert

23 May 2015 34	Borussia Dortmund	3–2	Werder Bremen	Dortmund
15:30 CEST (UTC+02:00)	Kagawa 15'; Aubameyang 17'; Mkhitaryan 42'	Report	Öztunalı 26'; Gebre Selassie 85'	Stadium: Westfalenstadion; Attendance: 80,667; Referee: Manuel Gräfe

=== DFB-Pokal ===
Win Draw Lose

17 August 2014 Round 1	FV Illertissen	2–3 (a.e.t.)	Werder Bremen	Ulm
14:30 CEST (UTC+02:00)	Nebel 24'; Passer (yellow card) 48'; Enderle (yellow card) 53'; Schaller (yellow card) 61'; Hämmerle (yellow card) 80', (goal) 102'; Spann (yellow card) 115'	Report	Hajrović 4' (pen.); Bartels (yellow card) 24'; Fritz (yellow card) 77'; Lukimya 93'; Selke 99'	Stadium: Donaustadion; Attendance: 10,205; Referee: Timo Gerach

28 October 2014 Round 2	Chemnitzer FC	0–2	Werder Bremen	Chemnitz
19:00 CET (UTC+01:00)	Fink (yellow card) 79'; Kehl-Gómez (yellow card) 88'	Report	Bartels 31'; Di Santo 49'; Fritz (yellow card) 69'	Stadium: Stadion an der Gellertstraße; Attendance: 10,161; Referee: Markus Schmidt

4 March 2015 Round 3	Arminia Bielefeld	3–1	Werder Bremen	Bielefeld
19:00 CET (UTC+01:00)	Junglas 32', 84'; Schuppan 57'; Börner (yellow card) 63'	Report	García (yellow card) 17'; Fritz (yellow card) 67' (yellow-red card) 89', (goal) 76'; Bartels (yellow card) 90+2'	Stadium: Bielefelder Alm; Attendance: 26,601; Referee: Bastian Dankert

== Squad ==
=== Squad and statistics ===
Sources: As of 1 November 2014

No.	Pos	Nat	Player	Total		Bundesliga		DFB-Pokal	
No.	Pos	Nat	Player	Apps	Goals	Apps	Goals	Apps	Goals
1	GK	(Germany) GER	Raphael Wolf	12	0	10	0	2	0
30	GK	(Austria) AUT	Richard Strebinger	0	0	0	0	0	0
40	GK	(Germany) GER	Raif Husić	0	0	0	0	0	0
2	DF	(Argentina) ARG	Santiago García	12	0	10	0	2	0
3	DF	(Italy) ITA	Luca Caldirola	4	0	3	0	1	0
4	DF	(Spain) ESP	Álex Gálvez	11	1	7+2	1	2	0
5	DF	(Democratic Republic of the Congo) COD	Assani Lukimya	9	2	8	1	1	1
15	DF	(Austria) AUT	Sebastian Prödl	9	1	8	1	1	0
19	DF	(Germany) GER	Luca-Milan Zander	0	0	0	0	0	0
23	DF	(Czech Republic) CZE	Theodor Gebre Selassie	3	0	1+1	0	1	0
25	DF	(Germany) GER	Oliver Hüsing	0	0	0	0	0	0
38	DF	(Germany) GER	Marnon-Thomas Busch	8	1	3+4	1	0+1	0
6	MF	(Democratic Republic of the Congo) COD	Cédric Makiadi	6	0	5	0	1	0
7	MF	(Poland) POL	Ludovic Obraniak	2	0	1	0	0+1	0
8	MF	(Germany) GER	Clemens Fritz	8	0	7	0	1	0
11	MF	(Netherlands) NED	Eljero Elia	8	0	7	0	1	0
14	MF	(Bosnia and Herzegovina) BIH	Izet Hajrović	9	1	4+3	0	2	1
16	MF	(Austria) AUT	Zlatko Junuzović	11	0	10	0	1	0
17	MF	(Germany) GER	Özkan Yıldırım	0	0	0	0	0	0
18	MF	(Germany) GER	Felix Kroos	8	0	3+3	0	1+1	0
21	MF	(Germany) GER	Levent Ayçiçek	2	0	0+1	0	1	0
22	MF	(Germany) GER	Fin Bartels	11	2	8+1	1	2	1
26	MF	(Germany) GER	Julian von Haacke	0	0	0	0	0	0
44	MF	(Germany) GER	Philipp Bargfrede	0	0	0	0	0	0
9	FW	(Argentina) ARG	Franco Di Santo	11	7	10	6	1	1
24	FW	(Germany) GER	Nils Petersen	7	0	1+5	0	0+1	0
27	FW	(Germany) GER	Davie Selke	10	2	4+4	1	0+2	1
