= 2011–12 SV Werder Bremen season =

Werder Bremen
2011–12 season
- Manager: Thomas Schaaf
- Bundesliga: 9th
- DFB-Pokal: Round 1
- Top goalscorer: League: Claudio Pizarro (18); All: Claudio Pizarro (18)
Home colours	Away colours	Third colours

The 2011–12 Werder Bremen season began on 30 July against 1. FC Heidenheim.

== Review and events ==
=== Friendlies ===
Werder Bremen started the 2011–12 season by beating lower division German side Meppen by 13–1. They then however lost against Danish side Midtjylland 5–4. They then beat Rot-Weiß Erfurt 2–1. They then drew 0–0 against Chemnitzer then beat SC Freiburg 4–3. They were held to a draw against Greek side Olympiacos and then lost to 3. Liga side Heidenheim 2-1. They then went on to beat Everton 1–0 and went past FC St. Pauli 5–4. They lost though against Fenerbahçe 1–0 and drew 2–2 to Union Berlin. In October, they beat VfL Osnabrück 3–0. They lost to Eintracht Braunschweig 2–1 and lost to Ajax and Hansa Rostock, but beat AZ 2–1.

=== Transfers Summer ===
Bremen lost Torsten Frings and Petri Pasanen on free transfers to Toronto FC and Red Bull Salzburg respectively. The club also lost Peter Niemeyer, who joined Hertha BSC permanently after having been on loan during the 2010–11 season. German international Per Mertesacker also departed, joining Arsenal for a £11 million transfer fee.

Bremen signed Mehmet Ekici from Bayern Munich and Tom Trybull from Hansa Rostock. The club also signed Lukas Schmitz from Schalke 04, Andreas Wolf from 1. FC Nürnberg, while Sokratis Papastathopoulos signed on loan from Genoa. Bremen also signed Florian Hartherz from VfL Wolfsburg and Aleksandar Ignjovski from 1860 Munich.

=== Transfers Winter ===
During the winter transfer window, Bremen sold Andreas Wolf and sent Sandro Wagner out on loan, while signing 2010 Austrian Player of the Year Zlatko Junuzović from Austria Wien. Bremen also signed François Affolter from Young Boys on loan.

== Competitions ==
=== Bundesliga ===
6 August 2011 1	Werder Bremen	2–0	1. FC Kaiserslautern	Bremen
15:30 CEST (UTC+02)	Rosenberg 60', 81'; Wesley (yellow card) 71'	Report	Sukuta-Pasu (yellow card) 17'; Dick (yellow card) 73'	Stadium: Weserstadion; Attendance: 41,100; Referee: Günter Perl; Man of the Match: Clemens Fritz

14 August 2011 2	Bayer Leverkusen	1–0	Werder Bremen	Leverkusen
17:30 CEST (UTC+02)	Kießling (yellow card) 44'; Kadlec 85'	Report	Papastathopoulos (yellow card) 47'; Schmitz (yellow card) 83'	Stadium: BayArena; Attendance: 30,210; Referee: Felix Brych; Man of the Match: Tim Wiese

20 August 2011 3	Werder Bremen	5–3	SC Freiburg	Bremen
CEST (UTC+02)	Fritz 30'; Pizarro 34'; Arnautović 65'; Schmitz (yellow card) 71'; Hunt 87' (pen.); Wesley 90+3'	Report	Cissé 7', 48'; Schuster (yellow card) 60'; Flum (yellow card) 64'; Reisinger (yellow card) 75', (goal) 84'; Krmaš (yellow card) 86'	Stadium: Weserstadion; Attendance: 39,201; Referee: Peter Sippel; Man of the Match: Marko Marin

27 August 2011 4	1899 Hoffenheim	1–2	Werder Bremen	Sinsheim
15:30 CEST (UTC+02)	Roberto Firmino 37'	Report	Arnautović 38'; Rosenberg 83'; Ekici (yellow card) 85'	Stadium: Rhein-Neckar Arena; Attendance: 28,750; Referee: Babak Rafati; Man of the Match: Tim Wiese

10 September 2011 5	Werder Bremen	2–0	Hamburger SV	Bremen
18:30 CEST (UTC+02)	Pizarro (yellow card) 25', (goal) 52', 78'; Marin (yellow card) 45'; Bargfrede (yellow card) 68'	Report	Rajković (yellow card) 22'; Guerrero (yellow card) 23'; Mancienne (yellow card) 28'; Jansen (yellow card) 70'; Jarolím (yellow card) 72'	Stadium: Weserstadion; Attendance: 41,600; Referee: Manuel Gräfe; Man of the Match: Claudio Pizarro

17 September 2011 6	1. FC Nürnberg	1–1	Werder Bremen	Nuremberg
15:30 CEST (UTC+02)	Eigler (yellow card) 45'; Wollscheid 62'	Report	Wiese (red card) 17'; Ekici 24'; Ignjovski (yellow card) 90+3'	Stadium: Easy-Credit-Stadion; Attendance: 43,121; Referee: Jochen Drees; Man of the Match: Timmy Simons

25 September 2011 7	Werder Bremen	2–1	Hertha BSC	Bremen
17:30 CEST (UTC+02)	Pizarro 23', 90+3', (yellow card) 76'; Fritz (yellow card) 67'	Report	Ramos 3', (yellow card) 10' (yellow-red card) 63'; Lell (yellow card) 12' (yellow-red card) 57'; Janker (yellow card) 74'; Mijatović (yellow card) 89'	Stadium: Weserstadion; Attendance: 40,760; Referee: Felix Brych; Man of the Match: Claudio Pizarro

2 October 2011 8	Hannover 96	3–2	Werder Bremen	Hanover
15:30 CEST (UTC+02)	Abdellaoue 2' (pen.), 38', 60'; Stindl (yellow card) 44'; Schulz (yellow card) 55'; Pinto (yellow card) 56'; Cherundolo (yellow card) 74'; Schmiedebach (yellow card) 84'	Report	Wolf (yellow card) 30'; Marin (yellow card) 42'; Bargfrede (yellow card) 45'; Arnautović 45+3', (red card) 78'; Pizarro 84'	Stadium: AWD-Arena; Attendance: 49,000; Referee: Guido Winkmann; Man of the Match: Mohammed Abdellaoue

14 October 2011 9	Werder Bremen	0–2	Borussia Dortmund	Bremen
20:30 CEST (UTC+02)	Wolf (yellow card) 15'	Report	Perišić (yellow card) 38' (yellow-red card) 47', (goal) 42'; Subotić (yellow card) 45+1'; Owomoyela 71'	Stadium: Weserstadion; Attendance: 42,068; Referee: Florian Meyer; Man of the Match: Mats Hummels

21 October 2011 10	FC Augsburg	1–1	Werder Bremen	Augsburg
20:30 CEST (UTC+02)	Baier (yellow card) 6'; Bellinghausen 49'; Callsen-Bracker (yellow card) 90'; Jentzsch (yellow card) 90+2'	Report	Papastathopoulos (yellow card) 14'; Pizarro (yellow card) 56', (goal) 68'	Stadium: SGL arena Attendance: 30,660; Referee: Knut Kircher; Man of the Match: Simon Jentzsch

29 October 2011 11	Mainz 05	1–3	Werder Bremen	Mainz
18:30 CEST (UTC+02)	Kirchhoff (yellow card) 6'; Bungert 23'; Soto (yellow card) 89'	Report	Pizarro 29', (yellow card) 76'; Hunt 47'; Ignjovski (yellow card) 50'; Wagner (yellow card) 76'; Prödl 78'; Schmitz (yellow card) 89'	Stadium: Coface Arena; Attendance: 34,000; Referee: Deniz Aytekin

5 November 2011 12	Werder Bremen	3–2	1. FC Köln	Bremen
15:30 CET (UTC+01)	Papastathopoulos (yellow card) 20'; Fritz (yellow card) 45'; Bargfrede (yellow card) 47'; Pizarro 49', 54' (pen.), 86'	Report	Clemens 3'; Riether (yellow card) 42'; Podolski 45'; Sereno (red card) 53'; Rensing (yellow card) 78'; Lanig (yellow card) 89'	Stadium: Weserstadion; Attendance: 41,500; Referee: Michael Weiner; Man of the Match: Claudio Pizarro

19 November 2011 13	Borussia Mönchengladbach	5–0	Werder Bremen	Mönchengladbach
15:30 CET (UTC+01)	Herrmann 16'; Reus 23', 38', 51'; Arango 53'	Report	Papastathopoulos (yellow card) 37' (yellow-red card) 76'	Stadium: Borussia-Park; Attendance: 53,465; Referee: Felix Brych; Man of the Match: Marco Reus

27 November 2011 14	Werder Bremen	2–0	VfB Stuttgart	Bremen
15:30 CET (UTC+01)	Hunt 57'; Naldo 67'; Wolf (yellow card) 90'	Report	Tasci (yellow card) 44'; Gentner (yellow card) 57'; Boulahrouz (yellow card) 66'; Kvist (yellow card) 90+1'	Stadium: Weserstadion; Attendance: 40,800; Referee: Thorsten Kinhöfer; Man of the Match: Naldo

3 December 2011 15	Bayern Munich	4–1	Werder Bremen	Munich
15:30 CET (UTC+01)	Ribéry 22', 77'; Robben 69' (pen.), 83' (pen.); Kroos (yellow card) 84'	Match Report	Rosenberg 52'; Wolf (yellow card) 62'; Hunt (red card) 81'; Papastathopoulos (yellow card) 83'	Stadium: Allianz Arena; Attendance: 69,000; Referee: Florian Meyer; Man of the Match: Franck Ribéry

10 December 2011 16	Werder Bremen	4–1	VfL Wolfsburg	Bremen
15:30 CET (UTC+01)	Papastathopoulos 18', (yellow card) 46'; Pizarro 45'; Rosenberg 55'; Arnautović 71'	Report	Josué (yellow card) 21'; Chris (yellow card) 27'; Träsch (yellow card) 74'; Schäfer 86'	Stadium: Weserstadion; Attendance: 39,124; Referee: Knut Kircher; Man of the Match: Claudio Pizarro

17 December 2011 17	Schalke 04	5–0	Werder Bremen	Gelsenkirchen
18:30 CET (UTC+01)	Raúl 16', 20', 63', (yellow card) 43'; Papadopoulos 67'; Huntelaar 70'; Höwedes (yellow card) 76'	Match Report	Schmitz (yellow card) 26'; Fritz (yellow card) 65'	Stadium: Veltins-Arena; Attendance: 61,673; Referee: Manuel Gräfe; Man of the Match: Raúl

21 January 2012 18	1. FC Kaiserslautern	0–0	Werder Bremen	Kaiserslautern
18:30 CET (UTC+01)	Świerczok (yellow card) 58'; Tiffert (yellow card) 59'		Papastathopoulos (yellow card) 39'; Bargfrede (yellow card) 71'; Schmitz (yellow card) 75'	Stadium: Fritz-Walter-Stadion; Attendance: 40,381; Referee: Robert Hartmann

28 January 2012 19	Werder Bremen	1–1	Bayer Leverkusen	Bremen
15:30 CET (UTC+01)	Pizarro 29'; Rosenberg (yellow card) 52'; Ignjovski (yellow card) 89'; Bargfrede (yellow card) 90+1'		Castro (yellow card) 15'; Kadlec (yellow card) 44'; Reinartz 57'	Stadium: Weserstadion; Attendance: 40,060; Referee: Deniz Aytekin

5 February 2012 20	SC Freiburg	2–2	Werder Bremen	Freiburg
15:30 CET (UTC+01)	Makiadi 32'; Schmid 70'; Jendrišek (yellow card) 75'; Caligiuri (yellow card) 79'		Pizarro (yellow card) 28', (goal) 30', 48'; Ekici (yellow card) 53'	Stadium: Badenova-Stadion; Attendance: 22,000

11 February 2012 21	Werder Bremen	1–1	1899 Hoffenheim	Bremen
15:30 CET (UTC+01)	Ekici (yellow card) 45'; Wiese (yellow card) 63'; Papastathopoulos (yellow card) 82'; Arnautović 89'		Vestergaard 4', (yellow card) 36'; Weis (yellow card) 54'; Roberto Firmino (yellow card) 88'; Compper (yellow card) 90+3'	Stadium: Weserstadion; Attendance: 39,176; Referee: Michael Weiner

18 February 2012 22	Hamburger SV	1–3	Werder Bremen	Hamburg
15:30 (UTC+01)	Petrić 75'; Jarolím (yellow card) 71'		Marin 9'; Bargfrede (yellow card) 33'; Trybull 45', (yellow card) 84'; Fritz (yellow card) 54'; Arnautović 86'	Stadium: Imtech Arena; Attendance: 56,553; Referee: Thorsten Kinhöfer

25 February 2012 23	Werder Bremen	0–1	1. FC Nürnberg	Bremen
18:30 (UTC+01)	Junuzović (yellow card) 19'; Fritz (yellow card) 75'; Papastathopoulos (yellow card) 90+4'	Report	Balitsch (yellow card) 5'; Esswein 65'; Feulner (yellow card) 70'; Schäfer (yellow card) 90+4'	Stadium: Weserstadion; Attendance: 40,204; Referee: Felix Zwayer

3 March 2012 24	Hertha BSC	1–0	Werder Bremen	Berlin
	Raffael (yellow card) 29'; Rukavytsya 63'; Mijatović (yellow card) 86'	Report	Affolter (yellow card) 45'	Stadium: Olympiastadion; Attendance: 52,744; Referee: Günter Perl

11 March 2012 25	Werder Bremen	3–0	Hannover 96	Bremen
	Pizarro 31'; Prödl 49'; Rosenberg 56'	Report	Sobiech (yellow card) 67'; Stindl (yellow card) 71'; Royer (yellow card) 72'; Lala (yellow card) 90+1'	Stadium: Weserstadion; Attendance: 41,500; Referee: Christian Dingert

17 March 2012 26	Borussia Dortmund	1–0	Werder Bremen	Dortmund
	Kagawa 8'; Piszczek (yellow card) 29'	Report	Ignjovski (yellow card) 32'; Affolter (yellow card) 61'; Fritz (yellow card) 89'	Stadium: Westfalenstadion; Attendance: 80,720; Referee: Deniz Aytekin

24 March 2012 27	Werder Bremen	1–1	FC Augsburg	Bremen
	Fritz (yellow card) 18'; Füllkrug 61'; Affolter (yellow card) 86'; Rosenberg (yellow card) 90+2'	Report	Davids (yellow card) 53'; Verhaegh (yellow card) 66', (goal) 90+2'; Baier (yellow card) 81'	Stadium: Weserstadion; Attendance: 40,208; Referee: Markus Wingenbach

31 March 2012 28	Werder Bremen	0–3	Mainz 05	Bremen
	Fritz (yellow card) 54'	Report	Szalai 18'; Choupo-Moting 48', 74'; Zabavník (yellow card) 62'; Soto (yellow card) 63'	Stadium: Weserstadion; Attendance: 40,132; Referee: Knut Kircher

7 April 2012 29	1. FC Köln	1–1	Werder Bremen	Cologne
	Peszko (yellow card) 27'; Jemal 39'; Riether (yellow card) 58'; Jajalo (yellow card) 75'	Report	Fritz (yellow card) 22'; Rosenberg 24'; Papastathopoulos (yellow card) 35'	Stadium: RheinEnergieStadion; Attendance: 50,000; Referee: Günter Perl

10 April 2012 30	Werder Bremen	2–2	Borussia Mönchengladbach	Bremen
	Rosenberg 18'; Boenisch (red card) 27'; Naldo 74'	Report	Neustädter (yellow card) 36'; Reus (yellow card) 39'; Brouwers (yellow card) 49'; Hanke 52', 67'; Arango (yellow card) 60'	Stadium: Weserstadion; Attendance: 42,100; Referee: Marco Fritz

13 April 2012 31	VfB Stuttgart	4–1	Werder Bremen	Stuttgart
	Gentner 37'; Harnik 45+1', 53'; Niedermeier (yellow card) 87'; Cacau 89'	Report	Rosenberg 25'; Schmitz (yellow card) 76'; Papastathopoulos (yellow card) 81'; Fritz (yellow card) 88'	Stadium: Mercedes-Benz Arena; Attendance: 59,000; Referee: Tobias Welz

21 April 2012 32	Werder Bremen	1–2	Bayern Munich	Bremen
	Naldo 51'	Report	Naldo 75' (o.g.); Ribéry 90'	Stadium: Weserstadion; Attendance: 42,100; Referee: Manuel Gräfe

21 April 2012 33	VfL Wolfsburg	3–1	Werder Bremen	Wolfsburg
	Salihamidžić 40', (yellow card) 79'; Helmes 66', 89'; Josué (yellow card) 84'	Report	Stevanović (yellow card) 42'; Rosenberg 45+1', (yellow card) 86'; Papastathopoulos (yellow card) 62'	Stadium: Volkswagen Arena; Attendance: 30,000; Referee: Felix Brych

5 May 2012 34	Werder Bremen	2–3	Schalke 04	Bremen
	Papastathopoulos (yellow card) 27'; Pizarro 41' (pen.), 82'; Fritz (yellow card) 89'	Report	Draxler 30'; Moritz (yellow card) 32'; Huntelaar 65', 74'	Stadium: Weserstadion; Attendance: 42,100; Referee: Deniz Aytekin

=== DFB-Pokal ===
30 July 1st Round	1. FC Heidenheim	2–1	Werder Bremen	Heidenheim
15:30 CEST (UTC+02)	Sauter 56'; Schnatterer 58'	Match Report	Rosenberg 3'	Stadium: Voith-Arena; Attendance: 10,000 (sell-out); Referee: Jochen Drees

== Player information ==
=== Roster and statistics ===
As of 23 December 2011

Squad Season 2011–12
Player					Bundesliga		DFB-Pokal		Totals	
Player	Nat.	Birthday	at Werder since	Previous club	Matches	Goals	Matches	Goal	Matches	Goals
Goalkeepers
Tim Wiese	(Germany)	17 December 1981	2005	1. FC Kaiserslautern	13	0	1	0	14	0
Sebastian Mielitz	(Germany)	18 July 1989	2005	Energie Cottbus	5	0	0	0	5	0
Christian Vander	(Germany)	24 October 1980	2005	VfL Bochum	0	0	0	0	0	0
Defenders
Leon Balogun	(Germany)	28 June 1988	2010	Hannover 96	0	0	0	0	0	0
Sebastian Boenisch	(Poland)	18 July 1989	2007	Schalke 04	0	0	0	0	0	0
Clemens Fritz	(Germany)	7 December 1980	2006	Bayer Leverkusen	17	1	1	0	18	1
Florian Hartherz	(Germany)	29 May 1993	2011	VfL Wolfsburg	10	0	0	0	10	0
Naldo	(Brazil)	10 September 1982	2005	Juventude	12	1	0	0	12	1
Sebastian Prödl	(Austria)	21 June 1987	2008	Sturm Graz	11	1	0	0	11	1
Lukas Schmitz	(Germany)	13 October 1988	2011	Schalke 04	14	0	1	0	15	0
Mikaël Silvestre	(France)	9 August 1977	2010	Arsenal	0	0	0	0	0	0
Sokratis Papastathopoulos	(Greece)	9 June 1988	2011	Milan	14	1	1	0	15	1
Andreas Wolf	(Germany)	12 June 1982	2011	1. FC Nürnberg	15	0	1	0	16	0
Per Mertesacker	(Germany)	29 September 1984	2006	Hannover 96	4	0	0	0	4	0
Midfielders
Philipp Bargfrede	(Germany)	3 March 1989	2004	TuS Heeslingen	15	0	1	0	16	1
Tim Borowski	(Germany)	2 May 1980	2009	Bayern Munich	0	0	1	0	1	0
Mehmet Ekici	(Turkey)	25 March 1990	2011	Bayern Munich	14	1	1	0	15	1
Aaron Hunt	(Germany)	4 September 1986	2001	Goslarer SC 08	15	3	1	0	16	3
Aleksandar Ignjovski	(Serbia)	27 January 1991	2011	OFK Beograd	12	0	0	0	12	0
Felix Kroos	(Germany)	12 March 1991	2010	Hansa Rostock	0	0	0	0	0	0
Marko Marin	(Germany)	13 March 1989	2010	Borussia Mönchengladbach	11	0	1	0	12	0
Aleksandar Stevanović	(Serbia)	16 February 1992	2011	Schalke 04	1	0	0	0	1	0
Predrag Stevanović	(Serbia)	3 March 1991	2011	Schalke 04	0	0	0	0	0	0
Florian Trinks	(Germany)	29 September 1984	2006	Carl Zeiss Jena	3	0	0	0	3	0
Tom Trybull	(Germany)	9 March 1993	2011	Hansa Rostock	0	0	0	0	0	0
Wesley	(Brazil)	24 June 1987	2010	Santos	5	1	0	0	5	1
Özkan Yıldırım	(Germany)	10 April 1993	2003	TuS Sulingen	0	0	0	0	0	0
Forwards
Marko Arnautović	(Austria)	19 April 1989	2010	Internazionale	13	4	1	0	14	4
Denni Avdić	(Sweden)	5 September 1988	2011	Elfsborg	0	0	0	0	0	0
Onur Ayık	(Turkey)	28 January 1990	2004	Viktoria Rethem	0	0	0	0	0	0
Claudio Pizzaro	(Peru)	10 March 1978	2009	Chelsea	15	12	0	0	15	12
Markus Rosenberg	(Sweden)	27 September 1982	2011	Racing Santander	16	5	1	1	17	6
Lennart Thy	(Germany)	25 February 1992	2007	JFV Norden	2	0	1	0	3	0
Sandro Wagner	(Germany)	29 November 1987	2010	MSV Duisburg	7	0	1	0	8	0

=== Transfers ===
==== In ====
No.	Pos.	Nat.	Name	Age	EU	Moving from	Type	Transfer window	Ends	Transfer fee	Source
11	FW	(Sweden)	Markus Rosenberg	29	EU	Racing Santander (Spain)	End of loan	Summer	2012		
13	DF	(Germany)	Lukas Schmitz	23	EU	Schalke 04 (Germany)	Transfer	Summer	2015		
17	MF	(Serbia)	Aleksandar Ignjovski	20	Non-EU	OFK Beograd (Serbia)	Transfer	Summer			
20	MF	(Turkey)	Mehmet Ekici	20	Non-EU	Bayern Munich (Germany)	Transfer	Summer		€5,000,000	
22	DF	(Greece)	Sokratis Papastathopoulos	23	EU	Milan (Italy)	Loan	Summer	2012	€600,000	
23	DF	(Germany)	Andreas Wolf	29	EU	1. FC Nürnberg (Germany)	Transfer	Summer			

==== Out ====
No.	Pos.	Nat.	Name	Age	EU	Moving to	Type	Transfer window	Transfer fee	Source
3	DF	(Germany)	Per Mertesacker	27	EU	Arsenal (England)	Transfer	Summer	£8,000,000	
3	MF	(Germany)	Torsten Frings	35	EU	Toronto FC (Canada)	Free	Summer	N/A	
3	DF	(Finland)	Petri Pasanen	31	EU	Red Bull Salzburg (Austria)	Free	Summer	N/A	
3	MF	(Germany)	Peter Niemeyer	28	EU	Hertha BSC	Transfer	Summer	£700,000	
3	DF	(Germany)	Andreas Wolf	29	EU	Monaco (France)	Transfer	Winter	£1,000,000	
