= Sebastian Prödl =

Austrian footballer (born 1987)

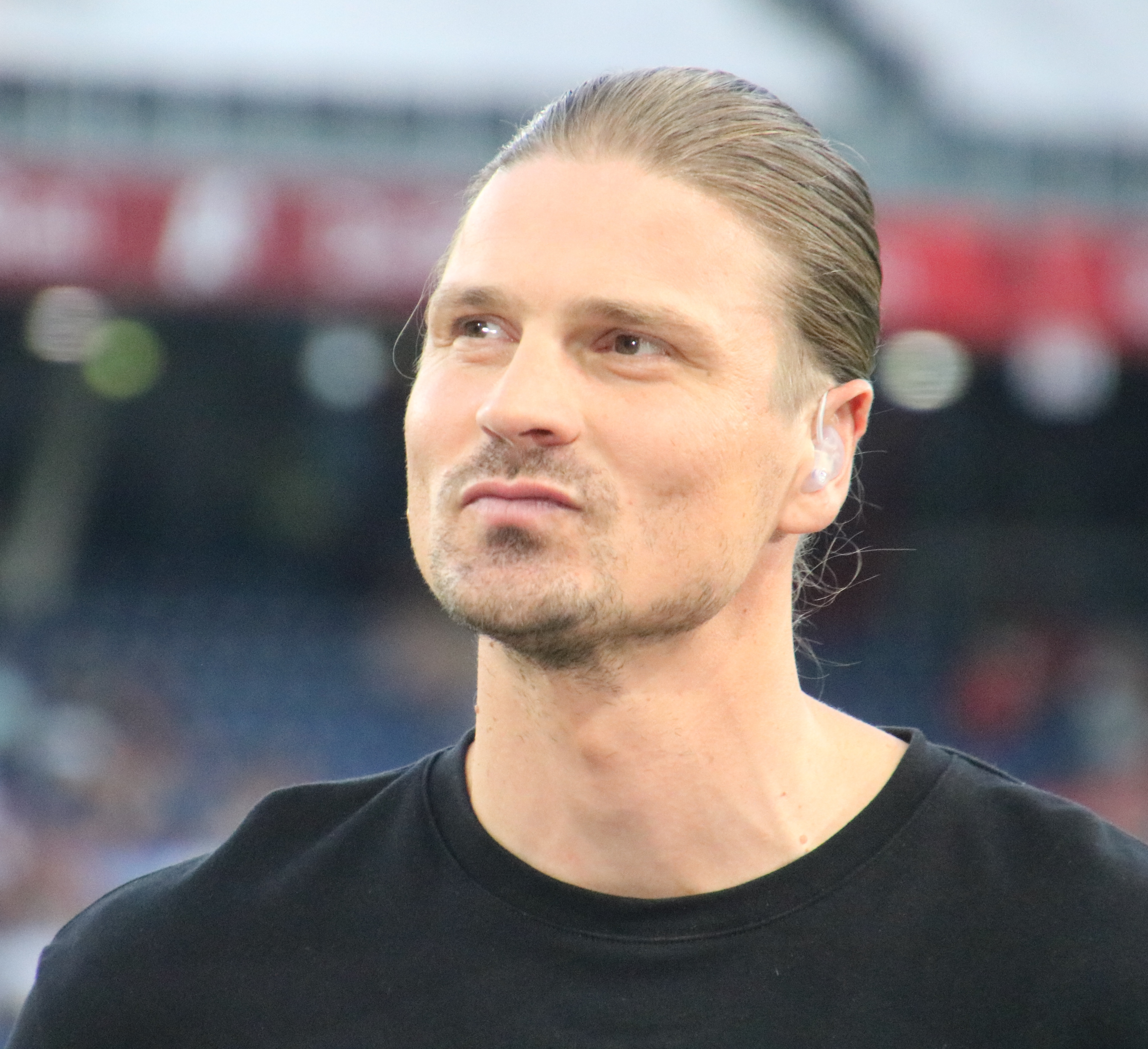
- Prödl in 2024

Personal information
- Full name: Sebastian Prödl
- Date of birth: 21 June 1987 (age 39)
- Place of birth: Graz, Styria, Austria
- Height: 1.96 m (6 ft 5 in)
- Position: Centre-back

Youth career
- 1993–1997: SV Kirchberg
- 1997–2002: SV Feldbach
- 2002–2006: Sturm Graz

Senior career*
Years	Team	Apps	(Gls)
2006–2008	Sturm Graz	43	(4)
2008–2015	Werder Bremen	149	(10)
2010	Werder Bremen II	1	(0)
2015–2020	Watford	77	(3)
2020–2021	Udinese	0	(0)
Total		270	(17)

International career
	Austria U19	5	(0)
	Austria U20	8	(1)
2007–2018	Austria	73	(4)
- * Club domestic league appearances and goals

Sebastian Prödl (born 21 June 1987) is an Austrian former professional footballer who played as a centre-back. A full international from 2007 to 2018, he represented the Austria national team at UEFA Euro 2008 and UEFA Euro 2016.

Having started his career at Sturm Graz in 2006 he moved to Germany two years later where he played for Werder Bremen until 2015, and then Premier League club Watford F.C. for five years, before landing at Udinese in Italy.

== Club career ==
=== Sturm Graz ===
Aged 19, Prödl began his professional career playing for Sturm Graz in the Austrian Bundesliga making his debut on 9 December 2006 in a 3–0 loss against SV Mattersburg. He scored his first Sturm Graz goal against Rheindorf Altach on 9 May 2007 in a 1–0 win. Prödl went on to make sixteen appearances and scoring once in his first season.

Prödl soon established himself in the first team at Sturm Graz and despite the international commitment and injury, He went on to score three goals in 27 appearances against SV Mattersburg, Red Bull Salzburg and Austria Kärnten. His performances soon attracted attention from Serie A and Bundesliga clubs. In response to the transfer speculation Sturm Graz placed a price tag of €5 million on him.

=== Werder Bremen ===
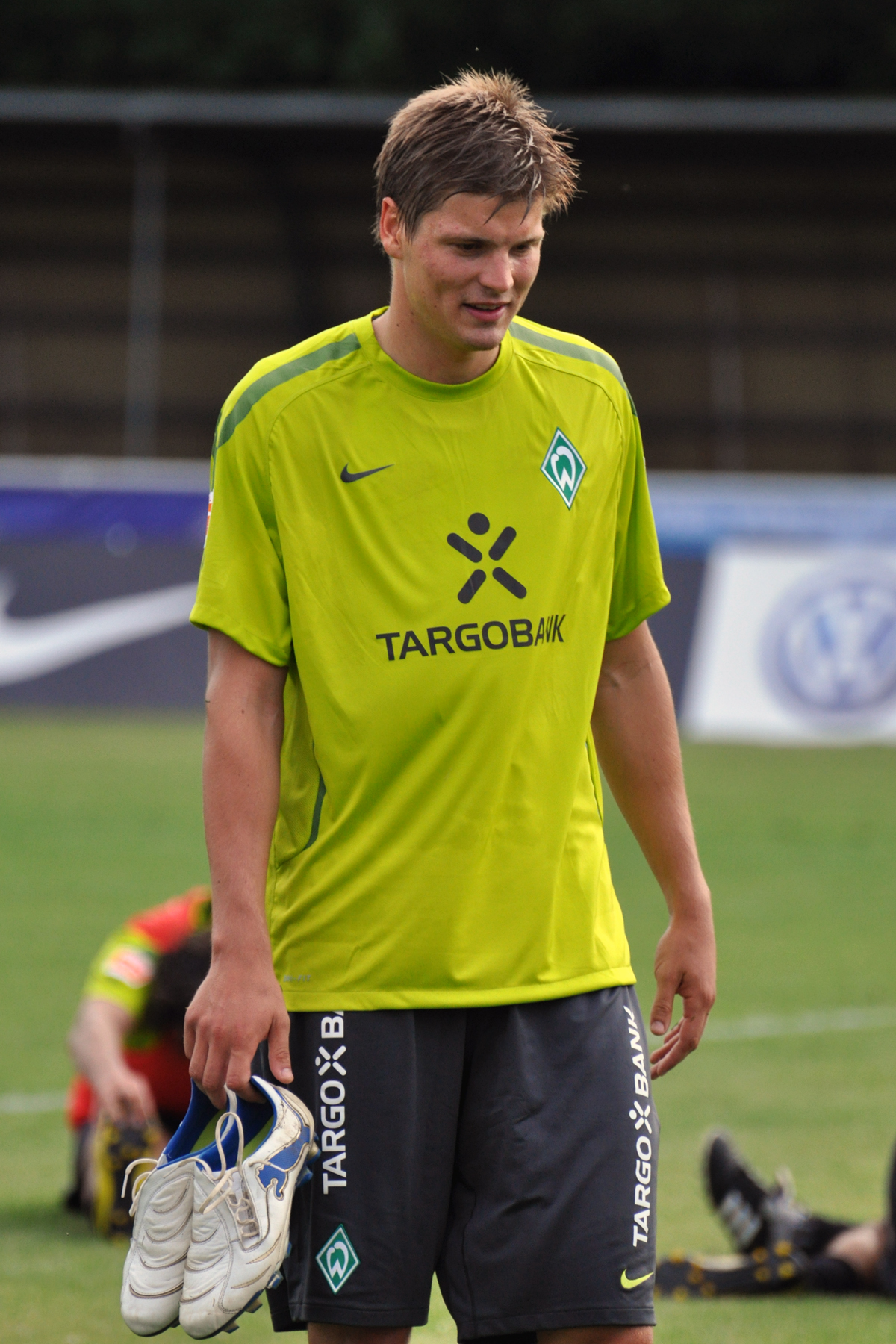
Prödl in training during his time at Werder Bremen

On 15 July 2008, Prödl moved to Germany to play for Werder Bremen for a transfer fee of €2.5 million, signing a contract until 2012. Upon joining Werder Bremen, he said his aim at the club was to win trophies.

Prödl made his Werder Bremen debut in the first round of the DFB-Pokal in a 9–3 win over Eintracht Nordhorn on 9 August 2008. A week later, he made his league debut for the club, in a 2–2 draw against Arminia Bielefeld. He made his Champions League debut, playing as a right-back, in a 1–1 draw against Inter Milan on 1 October 2008. By the first half of the season, he had appeared in 13 of 17 league matches, also playing in the unfamiliar right-back role in absence of Clemens Fritz. In the last match of the first half of the season he injured his ankle which saw him out for two months. On 7 March 2009, after making the bench in three matches, Prödl returned to the first team in a 0–0 draw against Hoffenheim. He scored his first Werder Bremen goal in the second leg of the last 16 of the UEFA Cup in a 2–2 draw against Saint-Étienne, from which the club progressed winning 3–2 on aggregate. Upon his return he reverted to centre-back going on to make a total of 22 appearances in his first season. Prödl formed a partnership with Naldo in central defence when they beat Bayer Leverkusen 1–0 in the DFB-Pokal Final. He also featured in the UEFA Cup final, playing the full 120 minutes in a 3–2 loss against Shakhtar Donetsk.

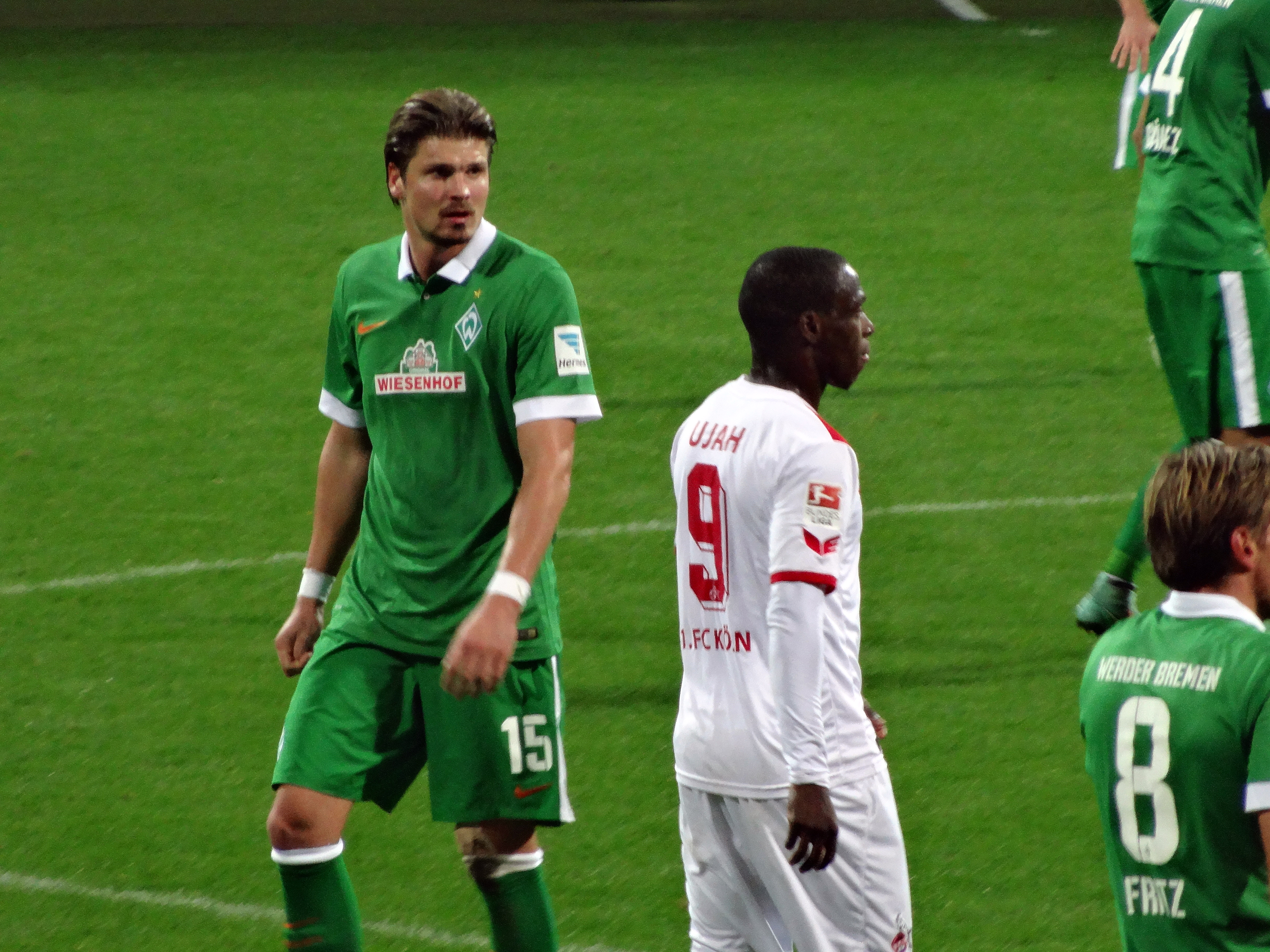
Prödl in his last season at Werder Bremen

In the opening game of the 2009–10 season, Prödl played as a centre-back in a 3–2 loss against Eintracht Frankfurt and was sent-off in the last minutes after a second bookable offence. Soon after, he suffered a knee injury. After three months on the sidelines, he appeared on the substitution bench and made his return to the first team coming on for Naldo in the 76th minute of a 6–0 win over Freiburg on 21 November 2009. He scored his first Werder Bremen league goal on 27 February 2010, in a 2–1 win over Mainz 05. Prödl spent most of the season on the substitution bench making nine appearances for the club.

In the 2010–11 season, Prödl became a regular starter following Naldo's injury at the start of the season and formed a partnership in central defence with Per Mertesacker. He scored his first European goal on matchday 6 of the Champions League group stage in a 3–0 win over Inter Milan on 7 December 2010. He scored his first league goal of the season on 27 February 2011 in a 2–2 draw against Bayer Leverkusen. Having suffered a knee injury and undergone surgery it was announced in March 2011 that Prödl would miss the remainder of the 2010–11 season. He ended season with 25 appearances.

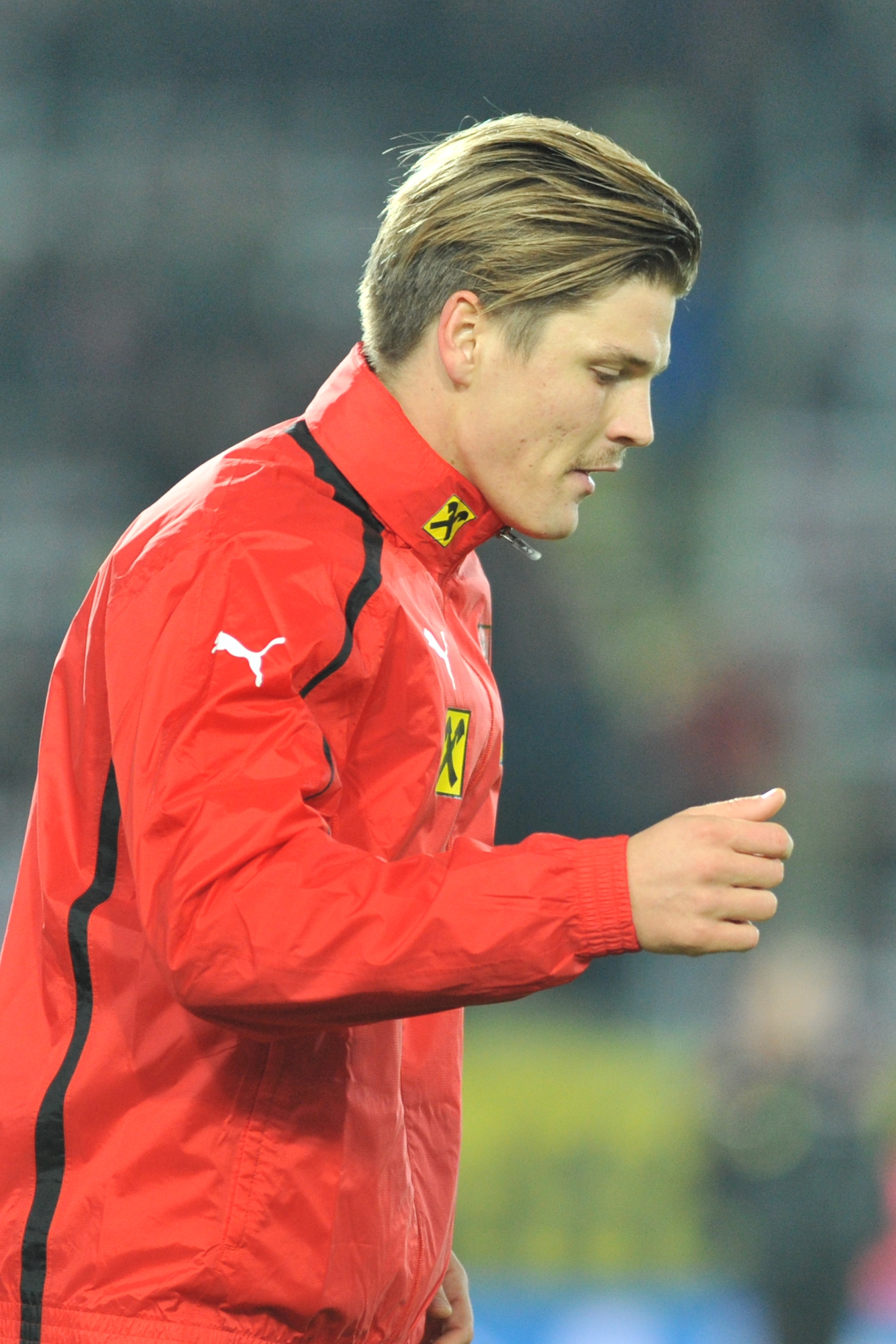
Prödl on international duty

At the start of the 2011–12 season, Prödl remained a regular starter. He scored his first goal of the season in a 3–1 win over Mainz on 29 October 2011. On 21 January 2012, during a match against Kaiserslautern, he was substituted off with an injury in the 29th minute. After a successful surgery, it was announced that he would be out for six weeks. Prödl made his return against Hannover 96 on 11 March 2012 scoring in a 3–0 win. However, his return was short-lived as he suffered a hamstring injury which kept him out for two weeks. He made his return to the first team on 28 April 2012, in a 3–1 loss against Wolfsburg. Having made 16 appearances in the 2011–12 season, it was announced that Prödl had signed a new three-year contract with the club, which would keep him at the club until summer 2015.

After playing two matches of the 2012–13 season, Prödl suffered injuries first to his thigh and then his head. Upon his return, he scored his first goal of the season in a 4–1 win over Hoffenheim on 2 December 2012. On 23 February 2013, he was sent-off in the 44th minute of a match against Bayern Munich for a foul on Mario Gómez; Werder Bremen went on to lose 6–1. He was given a two-match ban for the red card. In a match against Fortuna Düsseldorf on 13 April 2013 he was appointed captain and played the full 90 minutes of a 2–2 draw. Prödl finished the 2012–13 season with 28 caps.

In the 2013–14 season, Prödl scored in the club's first match without Thomas Schaaf, which Werder Bremen lost 3–1 to Saarbrücken in the first round of DFB Pokal. In the opening game of the season against Eintracht Braunschweig, he provided the assist for compatriot Zlatko Junuzović to score the only goal in the game. He then suffered a muscle injury which kept him out for two weeks. By 21 November 2013, his recovery was delayed by three weeks. After making his return, Prödl captained four matches between 1 February 2014 and 1 March 2014. He scored two goals in two matches against Wolfsburg and Hannover 96. In March 2014, he stated he would let his contract run out in 2015 if his contract would not be renewed in the summer. At the end of the season, Prödl had made 27 appearances helping the club avoid relegation and finish in 14th place.

After missing two games at the start of the 2014–15 season due to a hamstring injury, Prödl scored his first goal of the season on 12 September 2014, in a 3–3 draw against Bayer Leverkusen. He then missed one match, due to injury, first suffering the flu, then a hip problem. His hip injury came after scoring his second goal of the season, in a 2–0 win over Stuttgart on 8 November 2014. In a 5–2 defeat to Frankfurt, Prödl was substituted off in the first half and it was announced after the match that he would be out for six to eight weeks. He scored on his return on 21 February 2015, in a 1–1 draw against Schalke 04. During the season, he captained his team on five occasions and made 22 league appearances, scoring three goals.

On 12 May 2015, it was announced that Prödl would leave Bremen at the end of the 2014–15 season, as his contract had come to an end. The club previously offered him a new contract at the start of the season. During his time at Bremen he scored 10 goals, playing predominately in the central defence role.

=== Watford ===
On 1 June 2015, Prödl signed for Watford on a five-year contract after his contract at Werder Bremen had ended. He became Watford's first signing on their return to the Premier League. Upon joining the club, he was given number five shirt ahead of a new season. Prödl made his Watford debut in the opening game of the season, making his first start in a 2–2 draw against Everton. He remained as a first team regular at the start of the season until he was dropped to the bench in late October ahead of a match against Stoke City, and soon suffered a calf injury during international duty with Austria. As the 2015–16 season progressed towards the end, Prödl would be often be in and out of both in the starting eleven and substitute bench. He scored his first goal for Watford in a 3–1 defeat to West Ham United on 20 April 2016. In the last game of the season, he scored his second goal of the season, in a 2–2 draw against Sunderland. Despite being linked with a move to Serie A side Udinese, Prödl remained at the club and regained his first team place under the management of Walter Mazzarri. In a 3–1 win over Manchester United on 18 September 2016, he was praised for his performance and was named Man of the Match. In May 2017, he was named Watford's player of the season. In the 2018–19 and 2019–20 seasons he struggled with injuries and was unable to hold down a place in the starting lineup. On 31 January 2020, the last day of the 2019–20 winter transfer period, Prödl agreed the termination of his contract with Watford which was due to end in summer 2021.

=== Udinese ===
On 4 February 2020, he signed a 1.5-year contract with Italian Serie A club Udinese. He did not make any appearances in official games for Udinese throughout his contract, appearing only in pre-season friendlies in the summer of 2020.

Prödl announced his retirement from playing on 1 June 2022.

== International career ==
In 2007, he was called to play for Austria. He served as captain of Austria's U-20 national team at the 2007 U-20 World Cup in Canada where he helped his team to a fourth-place finish. After the tournament was over he was the only Austrian voted into the U-20 World Cup line-up by Italian magazine Gazzetta dello Sport.

After being called up to the national team for the first team in May 2007, Prödl made his senior debut for Austria on 30 May 2007 against Scotland. On 26 March 2008, Prödl scored two goals in an international friendly against the Netherlands. On 12 June 2008 during the Euro 2008 Austria vs. Poland game he was fouled in the 92nd minute in the penalty area and the referee, Howard Webb, awarded Austria a penalty kick, resulting in their only goal of the tournament.

He represented the national team at Euro 2016.

== Personal life ==
Prödl's cousin Viktoria Schnaderbeck is also a footballer who last played for Arsenal Women and still plays for the Austria women's national football team.

== Career statistics ==
=== Club ===
Appearances and goals by club, season and competition
Club	Season	League			National cup		League cup		Other		Total	
Club	Season	Division	Apps	Goals	Apps	Goals	Apps	Goals	Apps	Goals	Apps	Goals
Sturm Graz	2006–07	Austrian Bundesliga	16	1	0	0	—		—		16	1
Sturm Graz	2007–08	Austrian Bundesliga	27	2	0	0	—		—		27	2
Sturm Graz	Total		43	3	0	0	0	0	0	0	43	3
Werder Bremen	2008–09	Bundesliga	22	0	0	0	—		8	1	30	1
Werder Bremen	2009–10	Bundesliga	9	1	0	0	—		2	0	11	1
Werder Bremen	2010–11	Bundesliga	25	1	2	0	—		8	1	35	1
Werder Bremen	2011–12	Bundesliga	16	2	0	0	—		—		16	2
Werder Bremen	2012–13	Bundesliga	28	1	1	0	—		—		29	1
Werder Bremen	2013–14	Bundesliga	27	2	1	1	—		—		28	3
Werder Bremen	2014–15	Bundesliga	22	3	2	0	—		—		24	3
Werder Bremen	Total		149	10	6	1	0	0	18	2	173	13
Werder Bremen II	2009–10	3. Liga	1	0	—		—		—		1	0
Watford	2015–16	Premier League	21	2	3	0	—		—		24	2
Watford	2016–17	Premier League	33	1	1	0	—		—		34	1
Watford	2017–18	Premier League	21	0	0	0	0	0	0	0	21	0
Watford	2018–19	Premier League	1	0	0	0	1	0	0	0	2	0
Watford	2019–20	Premier League	1	0	0	0	2	0	0	0	3	0
Watford	Total		77	3	4	0	3	0	0	0	84	3
Career total			270	16	10	1	3	0	18	2	301	19

=== International ===
Appearances and goals by national team and year
National team	Year	Apps	Goals
Austria	2007	6	0
Austria	2008	12	2
Austria	2009	3	0
Austria	2010	7	1
Austria	2011	4	0
Austria	2012	6	0
Austria	2013	6	1
Austria	2014	4	0
Austria	2015	7	0
Austria	2016	5	0
Austria	2017	4	0
Austria	2018	9	0
Total		73	4

Scores and results list Austria's goal tally first, score column indicates score after each Prödl goal.

List of international goals scored by Sebastian Prödl
No.	Date	Venue	Opponent	Score	Result	Competition
1	26 March 2008	Ernst-Happel-Stadion, Vienna, Austria	Netherlands	2–0	3–4	Friendly
2	26 March 2008	Ernst-Happel-Stadion, Vienna, Austria	Netherlands	3–0	3–4	Friendly
3	8 October 2010	Ernst-Happel-Stadion, Vienna, Austria	Azerbaijan	1–0	3–0	UEFA Euro 2012 qualifying
4	15 October 2013	Tórsvøllur, Tórshavn, Faroe Islands	Faroe Islands	2–0	3–0	2014 FIFA World Cup qualification
