= 2010–11 SV Werder Bremen season =

Werder Bremen
2010–11 season
- Manager: Thomas Schaaf
- Bundesliga: 13th
- DFB-Pokal: Second round
- Champions League: Group stage
- Top goalscorer: League: Claudio Pizarro, Hugo Almeida (9); All: Claudio Pizarro (14)
Home colours	Away colours	Third colours

The 2010–11 SV Werder Bremen season began on 5 July with their first training session. Werder Bremen will play its matches at Weserstadion.

== Season ==
Approximately 250 angry Werder Bremen supporters confronted Werder Bremen coaches and players after a 4–0 loss to Hamburger SV. The fans prevented the team bus from entering the stadium; they demanded, and received, a face-to-face confrontation with the coach and players.

Werder Bremen's 13th-place finish was the worst in more than a decade.

== Matches ==
Win Draw Loss

=== Bundesliga ===
21 August 2010 1	Hoffenheim	4–1	Werder Bremen	Sinsheim, BW
15:30	Ba 20'; Mlapa 37'; Ibišević 41'; Salihović 43'	Report	Frings 3' (pen.)	Stadium: Rhein-Neckar-Arena; Attendance: 30,150; Referee: Günter Perl

28 August 2010 2	Werder Bremen	4–2	Köln	Bremen, HB
15:30	Frings 33' (pen.); Arnautović 35', 90+1'; Almeida 74'		Podolski 37'; McKenna 90+4'	Stadium: Weserstadion; Attendance: 35,500; Referee: Marco Fritz

11 September 2010 3	Bayern Munich	0–0	Werder Bremen	Munich, BY
18:30				Stadium: Allianz Arena; Attendance: 69,000; Referee: Knut Kircher

18 September 2010 4	Werder Bremen	0–2	Mainz	Bremen, HB
15:30			Risse 53'; Schürrle 61'	Stadium: Weserstadion; Attendance: 34,023; Referee: Markus Schmidt

21 September 2010 5	Hannover	4–1	Werder Bremen	Hanover, NI
20:00	Fritz 11' (o.g.); Konan 53'; Schulz 79'; Abdellaoue 90+2'		Frings 36' (pen.)	Attendance: 43,127; Referee: Felix Brych

25 September 2010 6	Werder Bremen	3–2	Hamburg	Bremen, HB
18:30	Demel 25' (o.g.); Almeida 28', 85'		Van Nistelrooy 59'; Pitroipa 63'	Stadium: Weserstadion; Attendance: 35,000; Referee: Thorsten Kinhöfer

3 October 2010 7	Bayer Leverkusen	2–2	Werder Bremen	Leverkusen, NW
17:30	Helmes 16'; Derdiyok 78'		Almeida 53'; Marin 62'	Stadium: BayArena; Attendance: 30,210; Referee: Manuel Gräfe

16 October 2010 8	Werder Bremen	2–1	Freiburg	Bremen, HB
15:30	Hunt 33'; Almeida 73'		Schuster 62'	Stadium: Weserstadion; Attendance: 34,500; Referee: Babak Rafati

23 October 2010 9	Borussia Mönchengladbach	1–4	Werder Bremen	Mönchengladbach, NW
15:30	Mertesacker 67' (o.g.)		Marin 5'; Wesley 12'; Hunt 51'; Pizarro 75'	Stadium: Borussia-Park; Attendance: 53,511; Referee: Günter Perl

30 October 2010 10	Werder Bremen	2–3	Nürnberg	Bremen, HB
15:30	Almeida 5'; Pizarro 90+2'		Gündoğan 45', 73'; Ekici 47'	Stadium: Weserstadion; Attendance: 35,500; Referee: Christian Dingert

7 November 2010 11	Stuttgart	6–0	Werder Bremen	Stuttgart, BW
17:30	Marica 10'; Cacau 31', 45'; Gentner 68'; Niedermeier 73'; Boka 86'			Stadium: Mercedes-Benz Arena; Attendance: 39,500; Referee: Thorsten Kinhöfer

13 November 2010 12	Werder Bremen	0–0	Eintracht Frankfurt	Bremen, HB
15:30				Stadium: Weserstadion; Attendance: 34,000; Referee: Manuel Gräfe

20 November 2010 13	Schalke 04	4–0	Werder Bremen	Gelsenkirchen, NW
15:30	Metzelder 22'; Raúl 45+2', 56', 71'		Bargfrede (yellow card) 82' (yellow-red card) 85'	Stadium: Arena AufSchalke; Attendance: 61,673; Referee: Knut Kircher

28 November 2010 14	Werder Bremen	3–0	St. Pauli	Bremen, HB
15:30	Almeida 1', 20', 64', (red card) 80'		Thorandt (red card) 90'	Stadium: Weserstadion; Attendance: 36,400; Referee: Felix Brych

4 December 2010 15	Wolfsburg	0–0	Werder Bremen	Wolfsburg, NI
15:30				Stadium: Volkswagen Arena; Attendance: 26,000; Referee: Deniz Aytekin

11 December 2010 16	Borussia Dortmund	2–0	Werder Bremen	Dortmund, NW
18:30	Şahin 9'; Kagawa 70'			Stadium: Signal Iduna Park; Attendance: 80,720; Referee: Florian Meyer

18 December 2010 17	Werder Bremen	1–2	Kaiserslautern	Bremen, HB
15:30	Hunt 34' (pen.); Wagner (yellow card) 46' (yellow-red card) 84'		Lakić 1', 52'; Bugera (yellow card) 31' (yellow-red card) 73'	Stadium: Weserstadion; Attendance: 32,000; Referee: Michael Weiner

15 January 2011 18	Werder Bremen	2–1	Hoffenheim	Bremen, HB
15:30	Pizarro 36'; Frings 90+2'		Vukčević 87'	Stadium: Weserstadion; Attendance: 30,000; Referee: Felix Zwayer

22 January 2011 19	Köln	3–0	Werder Bremen	Cologne, NW
18:30	Podolski 7', 84'; Matuschyk 33'			Stadium: RheinEnergieStadion; Attendance: 48,000; Referee: Peter Sippel)

29 January 2011 20	Werder Bremen	1–3	Bayern Munich	Bremen, HB
15:30	Mertesacker 47'; Wiese (red card) 88'		Robben 65'; Mertesacker 76' (o.g.); Klose 86'	Stadium: Weserstadion; Attendance: 40,500; Referee: Thorsten Kinhöfer

5 February 2011 21	Mainz	1–1	Werder Bremen	Mainz, RP
15:30	Schürrle 19'		Pizarro 90+2'	Stadium: Stadion am Bruchweg; Attendance: 20,300; Referee: Markus Schmidt

13 February 2011 22	Werder Bremen	1–1	Hannover 96	Bremen, HB
17:30	Mertesacker 50'		Konan 26'	Stadium: Weserstadion; Attendance: 39,500; Referee: Felix Brych

19 February 2011 23	Hamburg	4–0	Werder Bremen	Hamburg
15:30	Petrić 42'; Guerrero 64', 79'; Ben-Hatira 87'			Stadium: Imtech Arena; Attendance: 54,000; Referee: Florian Meyer

27 February 2011 24	Werder Bremen	2–2	Bayer Leverkusen	Bremen
17:30	Kießling 82' (o.g.); Prödl 90+1'		Derdiyok 42'; Rolfes 67'; Vidal (yellow card) 23' (yellow-red card) 87'	Stadium: Weserstadion; Attendance: 37,500; Referee: Deniz Aytekin

6 March 2011 25	Freiburg	1–3	Werder Bremen	Freiburg, BW
15:30	Cissé 49'		Wagner 12'; Pizarro 76'; Marin 90+1'	Stadium: Badenova-Stadion

12 March 2011 26	Werder Bremen	1–1	Borussia Mönchengladbach	Bremen
18:30 CET (UTC+01)	Wagner 39'	Match report	Dante 90+2'	Stadium: Weserstadion; Attendance: 40,500; Referee: Manuel Gräfe (Berlin)

19 March 2011 27	Nürnberg	1–3	Werder Bremen	Nuremberg
15:30 CET (UTC+01)	Gündoğan 30'; Chandler (yellow card) 54' (yellow-red card) 72'	Match report	Wagner 27' (pen.), 89' (pen.); Pizarro 50'	Stadium: Easy Credit Stadion; Attendance: 48,548; Referee: Michael Weiner (Giesen)

2 April 2011 28	Werder Bremen	1–1	VfB Stuttgart	Bremen
15:30 CEST (UTC+02)	Frings 34'	Match report	Hajnal 13'	Stadium: Weserstadion; Attendance: 40,500; Referee: Günter Perl (Pullach)

8 April 2011 29	Eintracht Frankfurt	1–1	Werder Bremen	Frankfurt
20:30 CEST (UTC+01)	Fenin 83'	Match report	Altıntop 58' (o.g.)	Stadium: Commerzbank-Arena; Attendance: 51,500; Referee: Florian Meyer (Burgdorf)

16 April 2011 30	Werder Bremen	1–1	FC Schalke 04	Bremen
15:30 CEST (UTC+02)	Wagner 59'	Match report	Edu 63'	Stadium: Weserstadion; Attendance: 40,500; Referee: Knut Kircher (Rottenburg)

23 April 2011 31	FC St. Pauli	1–3	Werder Bremen	Hamburg
15:30 CEST (UTC+01)	Bartels 29'	Match report	Thorandt 50' (o.g.); Pizarro 73', 74'	Stadium: Millerntor-Stadion; Attendance: 24,487; Referee: Michael Weiner (Giesen)

29 April 2011 32	Werder Bremen	0–1	VfL Wolfsburg	Bremen
20:30 CEST (UTC+02)		Match report	Riether 22'	Stadium: Weserstadion; Attendance: 40,000; Referee: Manuel Gräfe (Berlin)

7 May 2011 33	Werder Bremen	2–0	Borussia Dortmund	Bremen
15:30 CEST (UTC+02)	Silvestre 6'; Pizarro 64'	Match report		Stadium: Weserstadion; Attendance: 40,600; Referee: Günter Perl (Pullach)

14 May 2011 34	1. FC Kaiserslautern	3–2	Werder Bremen	Kaiserslautern
15:30 CEST (UTC+01)	Nemec 7'; Rodnei 9'; Lakić 30'	Match report	Frings 43'; Arnautović 55'	Stadium: Fritz-Walter-Stadion; Attendance: 49,780; Referee: Robert Hartmann (Wangen)

=== DFB-Pokal ===
14 August 2010 Round 1	Rot Weiss Ahlen	0–4	Werder Bremen	Ahlen
15:30		Report (in German)	Pizarro 28'; Almeida 63'; Borowski 68'; Marin 82'	Stadium: Wersestadion; Attendance: 9,120; Referee: Markus Wingenbach

26 October 2010 Round 2	Bayern Munich	2–1	Werder Bremen	Munich
20:30	Schweinsteiger 27', 75'	Report (in German)	Pizarro 2'	Stadium: Allianz Arena; Attendance: 64,000; Referee: Michael Weiner

=== UEFA Champions League ===
==== Play-off round ====
18 August 2010 First leg	Werder Bremen (Germany)	3–1	(Italy) Sampdoria	Bremen, Germany
20:45	Fritz 51'; Frings 67' (pen.); Pizarro 69'	Report	Pazzini 90'	Stadium: Weserstadion; Attendance: 25,276; Referee: Stéphane Lannoy (France)

24 August 2010 Second leg	Sampdoria (Italy)	3–2 (a.e.t.)	(Germany) Werder Bremen	Genoa, Italy
20:45	Pazzini 8', 13'; Cassano 85'	Report	Rosenberg 90+3'; Pizarro 100'	Stadium: Stadio Luigi Ferraris; Attendance: 27,574; Referee: Viktor Kassai (Hungary)

==== Group stage ====
Group A
Team	Pld	W	D	L	GF	GA	GD	Pts
(England) Tottenham Hotspur	6	3	2	1	18	11	+7	11
(Italy) Internazionale	6	3	1	2	12	11	+1	10
(Netherlands) Twente	6	1	3	2	9	11	−2	6
(Germany) Werder Bremen	6	1	2	3	6	12	−6	5

14 September 2010 1	Werder Bremen (Germany)	2–2	(England) Tottenham Hotspur	Bremen, Germany
20:45	Almeida 43'; Marin 47'	Report	Pasanen 12' (o.g.); Crouch 18'	Stadium: Weserstadion; Attendance: 30,344; Referee: Massimo Busacca (Switzerland)

29 September 2010 2	Internazionale (Italy)	4–0	(Germany) Werder Bremen	Milan, Italy
20:45	Eto'o 21', 27', 81'; Sneijder 34'	Report		Stadium: San Siro; Attendance: 48,126; Referee: Alberto Undiano Mallenco (Spain)

20 October 2010 3	Twente (Netherlands)	1–1	(Germany) Werder Bremen	Enschede, Netherlands
20:45	Janssen 75'	Report	Arnautović 80'	Stadium: De Grolsch Veste; Attendance: 23,248; Referee: Claus Bo Larsen (Denmark)

2 November 2010 4	Werder Bremen (Germany)	0–2	(Netherlands) Twente	Bremen, Germany
20:45		Report	Chadli 81'; De Jong 84'	Stadium: Weserstadion; Attendance: 30,200; Referee: Alain Hamer (Luxembourg)

24 November 2010 5	Tottenham Hotspur (England)	3–0	(Germany) Werder Bremen	London, England
20:45	Kaboul 6'; Modrić 45+1'; Crouch 79'	Report		Stadium: White Hart Lane; Attendance: 33,546; Referee: Olegário Benquerença (Portugal)

7 December 2010 6	Werder Bremen (Germany)	3–0	(Italy) Internazionale	Bremen, Germany
20:45	Prödl 39'; Arnautović 49'; Pizarro 88'	Report		Stadium: Weserstadion; Attendance: 30,400; Referee: Cüneyt Çakır (Turkey)

== Squad information ==
=== Transfers ===
In:

No.	Pos.	Nation	Player
7	FW	AUT	Marko Arnautović
16	DF	FRA	Mikaël Silvestre
17	MF	BIH	Said Husejinović
18	MF	GER	Felix Kroos
19	FW	GER	Sandro Wagner

Out:

No.	Pos.	Nation	Player
23	FW	POR	Hugo Almeida

=== First-team squad ===
Squad at end of season
Note: Flags indicate national team as defined under FIFA eligibility rules; some limited exceptions apply. Players may hold more than one non-FIFA nationality.

No.	Pos.	Nation	Player
1	GK	GER	Tim Wiese
2	DF	POL	Sebastian Boenisch (Note: Boenisch was born in Gliwice, Poland, but was raised in Germany from the age of 1 and represented Germany at U-20 and U-21 level before making his international debut for Poland in September 2010.)
3	DF	FIN	Petri Pasanen
4	DF	BRA	Naldo
5	MF	BRA	Wesley
6	MF	GER	Tim Borowski
7	FW	AUT	Marko Arnautović
8	DF	GER	Clemens Fritz
9	FW	SWE	Denni Avdić
10	MF	GER	Marko Marin (Note: Marin was born in Bosanska Gradiška, SFR Yugoslavia (now Bosnia and Herzegovina), but was raised in Germany from the age of 2 and represented Germany at U-16, U-17, U-18 and U-21 level before making his international debut for Germany in May 2008.)
14	MF	GER	Aaron Hunt
15	DF	AUT	Sebastian Prödl
16	DF	FRA	Mikaël Silvestre
17	MF	BIH	Said Husejinović
18	MF	GER	Felix Kroos
19	FW	GER	Sandro Wagner
20	MF	DEN	Daniel Jensen
21	GK	GER	Sebastian Mielitz

No.	Pos.	Nation	Player
22	MF	GER	Torsten Frings (captain)
24	FW	PER	Claudio Pizarro
25	DF	BRA	Samuel
27	DF	GER	Niklas Andersen
28	FW	GER	Kevin Schindler
29	DF	GER	Per Mertesacker (vice-captain)
31	MF	SRB	Predrag Stevanović
32	MF	GER	José-Alex Ikeng (Note: Ikeng was born in Bafia, Cameroon, but also qualified to represent Germany internationally and represented Germany at U-18 level.)
33	GK	GER	Christian Vander
35	MF	GER	Florian Trinks
36	FW	GER	Lennart Thy
37	DF	GER	Leon Balogun (Note: Balogun was born in West Berlin, West Germany (now Berlin, Germany), but also qualified to represent Nigeria internationally through his father and made his international debut for Nigeria in March 2014.)
41	DF	GER	Dominik Schmidt
42	GK	GER	Felix Wiedwald
43	FW	GER	Pascal Testroet
44	MF	GER	Philipp Bargfrede
46	FW	TUR	Onur Ayık (Note: Ayık was born in Walsrode, West Germany (now Germany), but also qualified to represent Turkey internationally and represented Turkey at U-16, U-18, U-19 and U-23 level.)

=== Left club during season ===
Note: Flags indicate national team as defined under FIFA eligibility rules; some limited exceptions apply. Players may hold more than one non-FIFA nationality.

No.	Pos.	Nation	Player
9	FW	SWE	Markus Rosenberg (on loan to Racing Santander)
23	FW	POR	Hugo Almeida (to Beşiktaş)

No.	Pos.	Nation	Player
45	DF	GER	Timo Perthel (on loan to Sturm Graz)
