= Assani Lukimya-Mulongoti =

Congolese footballer

Assani Lukimya
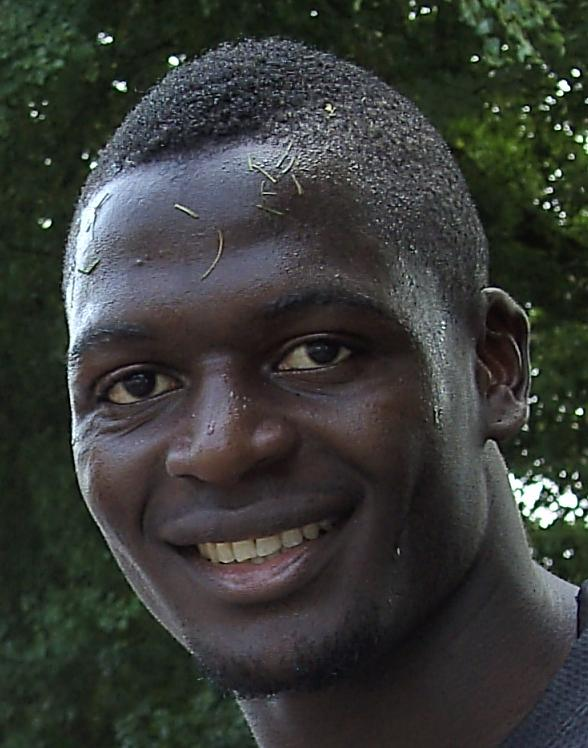
- Lukimya after practice with Werder in 2012

Personal information
- Date of birth: 25 January 1986 (age 40)
- Place of birth: Uvira, Zaire
- Height: 1.89 m (6 ft 2 in)
- Position: Centre-back

Team information
- Current team: 1. FC Monheim
- Number: 5

Youth career
- 1997–2000: SV Norden Nordwest 1898
- 2000–2004: Tasmania-Gropiusstadt

Senior career*
Years	Team	Apps	(Gls)
2004–2007	Hertha BSC II	54	(2)
2007–2009	Hansa Rostock II	28	(5)
2007–2009	Hansa Rostock	12	(0)
2009–2010	Carl Zeiss Jena	32	(3)
2010–2012	Fortuna Düsseldorf	64	(2)
2012–2015	Werder Bremen	79	(3)
2016–2018	Liaoning Whowin	69	(12)
2019–2021	Uerdingen 05	82	(7)
2022–2023	MSV Düsseldorf	50	(20)
2023–2025	1. FC Monheim	58	(14)
Total		528	(68)

International career
2008–2011	DR Congo	3	(0)
- * Club domestic league appearances and goals

Assani Lukimya-Mulongoti (born 25 January 1986) is a Congolese professional footballer who plays as a centre-back for German Oberliga Niederrhein club 1. FC Monheim.

== Club career ==
Lukimya began his career in Berlin with SV Norden Nordwest 1898, before moving to SV Tasmania-Gropiusstadt 73. In 2004, he was scouted by Hertha BSC, where he played for the reserve team.

After three years with Hertha, he initially signed a one-year contract with FC Hansa Rostock. In Rostock, he played for the reserves during his first year, before being promoted to the first team in 2008. In February 2008 he was rewarded with a professional contract running from July 2008 till 2010. On 9 March 2009, he was suspended from the senior team, and returned to play for the reserve team. On 18 August 2009, he was released from his contract and became a free agent.

He subsequently signed with FC Carl Zeiss Jena until 2010. On 20 April 2010, he announced his departure for the end of the season and signed for Fortuna Düsseldorf on a two-year contract the same day.

On 24 May 2012, Lukimya joined Werder Bremen, signing a contract until 30 June 2015. On 26 January 2016, Bremen announced Lukimya would leave the club for Liaoning Whowin. The reported transfer fee was €2 million.

On 31 January 2019, Lukimya returned to Germany, joining Uerdingen 05 on a free transfer.

== International career ==
His first game for the DR Congo national team was on 20 August 2008 against Togo in a friendly game.

== Personal life ==
Lukimya holds a German passport.

== Career statistics ==
=== Club ===
Appearances and goals by club, season and competition
Club	Season	League			Cup		Continental		Other		Total	
Club	Season	Division	Apps	Goals	Apps	Goals	Apps	Goals	Apps	Goals	Apps	Goals
Hertha BSC II	2004–05	Regionalliga Nord	1	0	—		—		—		1	0
Hertha BSC II	2005–06	Regionalliga Nord	21	0	—		—		—		21	0
Hertha BSC II	2006–07	Regionalliga Nord	32	2	—		—		—		32	2
Hertha BSC II	Total		54	2	—		—		—		54	2
Hansa Rostock II	2007–08	NOFV-Oberliga Nord	14	1	—		—		—		14	1
Hansa Rostock II	2008–09	Regionalliga Nord	14	4	—		—		—		14	4
Hansa Rostock II	Total		28	5	—		—		—		28	5
Hansa Rostock	2007–08	Bundesliga	7	0	0	0	—		—		7	0
Hansa Rostock	2008–09	2. Bundesliga	5	0	1	0	—		—		6	0
Hansa Rostock	Total		12	0	1	0	—		—		13	0
Carl Zeiss Jena	2009–10	3. Liga	32	3	0	0	—		2	0	34	3
Fortuna Düsseldorf	2010–11	2. Bundesliga	30	0	1	0	—		—		31	0
Fortuna Düsseldorf	2011–12	2. Bundesliga	34	2	3	0	—		2	0	39	2
Fortuna Düsseldorf	Total		64	2	4	0	—		2	0	70	2
Werder Bremen	2012–13	Bundesliga	22	1	0	0	—		—		22	1
Werder Bremen	2013–14	Bundesliga	23	0	0	0	—		—		23	0
Werder Bremen	2014–15	Bundesliga	22	2	1	1	—		—		23	3
Werder Bremen	2015–16	Bundesliga	12	0	3	0	—		—		15	0
Werder Bremen	Total		79	3	4	1	—		—		83	4
Liaoning Whowin	2016	Chinese Super League	28	6	0	0	—		—		28	6
Liaoning Whowin	2017	Chinese Super League	28	6	0	0	—		—		28	6
Liaoning Whowin	2018	China League One	13	0	0	0	—		—		13	0
Liaoning Whowin	Total		69	12	0	0	—		—		69	12
Uerdingen 05	2018–19	3. Liga	14	0	—		—		2	0	16	0
Uerdingen 05	2019–20	3. Liga	35	3	1	0	—		2	0	38	3
Uerdingen 05	2020–21	3. Liga	33	4	—		—		0	0	33	4
Uerdingen 05	Total		82	7	1	0	—		4	0	87	7
MSV Düsseldorf	2021–22	Landesliga Niederrhein	11	13	—		—		—		16	0
MSV Düsseldorf	2022–23	Oberliga Niederrhein	39	7	—		—		—		39	7
MSV Düsseldorf	Total		50	20	—		—		—		50	20
1. FC Monheim	2023–24	Landesliga Niederrhein	28	5	—		—		2	0	11	13
1. FC Monheim	2024–25	Oberliga Niederrhein	30	9	—		—		2	2	39	7
1. FC Monheim	Total		58	14	—		—		4	2	62	16
Career total			528	68	10	1	0	0	10	2	548	71
