= Aaron Hunt =

German footballer (born 1986)

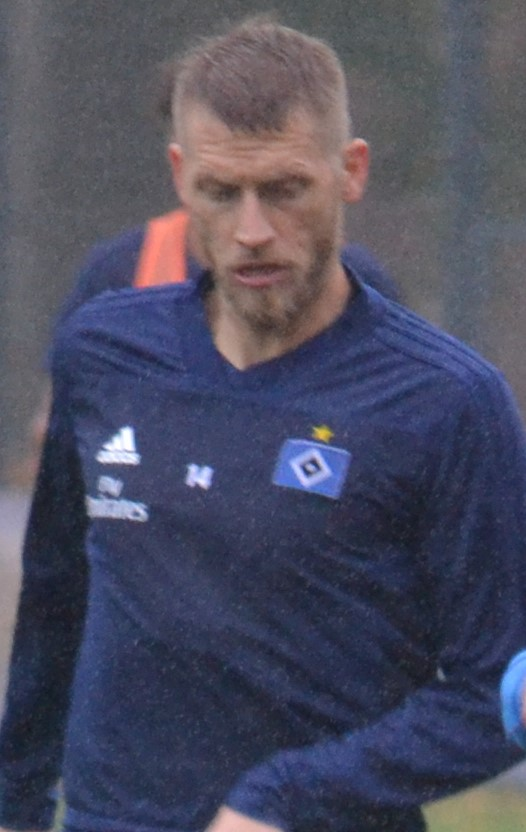
- Hunt in 2018

Personal information
- Date of birth: 4 September 1986 (age 40)
- Place of birth: Goslar, West Germany
- Height: 1.83 m (6 ft 0 in)
- Position: Attacking midfielder

Youth career
- 1993–1997: VfL Oker
- 1997–2001: Goslarer SC
- 2001–2003: Werder Bremen

Senior career*
Years	Team	Apps	(Gls)
2003–2007	Werder Bremen II	37	(9)
2004–2014	Werder Bremen	215	(46)
2014–2015	VfL Wolfsburg	17	(2)
2015–2021	Hamburger SV	144	(25)
Total		413	(82)

International career
2002	Germany U16	4	(1)
2002–2003	Germany U17	10	(6)
2005–2009	Germany U21	13	(3)
2009–2013	Germany	3	(0)
- * Club domestic league appearances and goals

Aaron Hunt (born 4 September 1986) is a German former professional footballer who played as an attacking midfielder.

He spent most of his career at Werder Bremen, making his first-team debut at the age of 18. In the Bundesliga, he also represented VfL Wolfsburg and Hamburger SV, winning the DFB-Pokal with the first club as well as the second.

Hunt won three caps for Germany, his first coming in 2009.

== Club career ==
=== Werder Bremen ===
Hunt was born in Goslar, Lower Saxony. After spending his first season at Werder Bremen in the reserves the year the first team achieved the double, he made his Bundesliga debut on 18 September 2004, coming on as a substitute in a 3–0 home win against Hannover 96. On his first appearance in the starting line-up, against Borussia Mönchengladbach on 12 February 2005, he scored his first goal, becoming the club's youngest-ever goalscorer at the age of 18 years and 161 days.

Early in 2006, Hunt suffered a mysterious knee injury, which after some months was found to be bursitis. As a result, he missed the remainder of the season following the winter break. In November, he renewed his contract until 2010 and, on 3 March 2007, netted a hat-trick in the 3–0 league victory over VfL Bochum. He finished that campaign with nine goals, and his team eventually ranked third behind VfB Stuttgart and Schalke 04.

Hunt scored a career-best 11 goals in 2012–13, but Werder could only finish in 14th place. In March 2014, after being awarded a penalty during a match against 1. FC Nürnberg, he successfully asked the referee to reverse his decision, because the opposition player had not touched him.

=== VfL Wolfsburg ===
On 26 May 2014, Hunt signed for VfL Wolfsburg. He made his debut for his new club on 17 August in a 5–4 penalty shoot–out win against Darmstadt 98 in the DFB-Pokal, being replaced at the start of extra time. His first league appearance came five days later, in a 2–1 loss at Bayern Munich.

Hunt scored his first goal for the Wolves on 21 September 2014, in a 4–1 defeat of Bayer Leverkusen at the Volkswagen Arena. He made his European debut the following week in a 4–1 loss to Everton, and netted for the first time in the UEFA Europa League on 6 November of that year, his brace helping the hosts to a 5–1 rout of Krasnodar; he finished the season with four goals in 22 competitive appearances.

=== Hamburger SV ===
On 31 August 2015, having already played the two first matches of the new season with Wolfsburg, Hunt joined Hamburger SV. He finished his first year at Volksparkstadion with one goal in 21 matches, scoring four goals from 26 total games the following campaign.

Hunt made 30 appearances in all competitions in 2017–18 (29 in the league), netting three times as the club was relegated to the 2. Bundesliga for the first time in its history. In the ensuing off-season, he was made new team captain after stripping Gōtoku Sakai of that role.

After Hunt's contract was not extended, he announced his retirement in February 2022 at the age of 35. He played over 400 league matches in the top three tiers of the German league pyramid.

== International career ==
Having a German father and an English mother, Hunt was eligible to play for both Germany or England. His mother's family all hailed from the London area, and his grandfather went to the same north-east school as Bobby Charlton. However, Hunt stated that he would only play for his birth nation. When asked which team he would represent at international level, he said he was '... honoured about this. But I have decided to play for Germany. ...', adding that he was steadfast on his decision.

In October 2006, Hunt appeared for the German under-21s in a 1–0 loss against England in Coventry for the 2007 UEFA European Championship qualification playoff (eventually 3–0 on aggregate). In November 2006, Hunt was charged by UEFA for serious unsporting behaviour, after complaints of racist remarks in the second leg of the under-21 playoff against England. He was banned for two games but, following an appeal, the decision was reversed.

On 6 November 2009, he was called up to the full side for two friendlies with Chile and Ivory Coast to be held during that month, making his debut in the latter after coming on late in the game for Bastian Schweinsteiger (the former had been cancelled following Robert Enke's suicide). His third and last international was the friendly against Ecuador in May 2013. The German national team won in Boca Raton against the South Americans 4-2.

== Career statistics ==
Appearances and goals by club, season and competition
Club	Season	League			DFB-Pokal		Continental		Other		Total		Ref.
Club	Season	Division	Apps	Goals	Apps	Goals	Apps	Goals	Apps	Goals	Apps	Goals	Ref.
Werder Bremen II	2003–04	Regionalliga Nord	7	2	—		—		—		7	2	
Werder Bremen II	2004–05	Regionalliga Nord	22	6	—		—		—		22	6	
Werder Bremen II	2005–06	Regionalliga Nord	6	1	—		—		—		6	1	
Werder Bremen II	2006–07	Regionalliga Nord	2	0	—		—		—		2	0	
Werder Bremen II	Total		37	9	—						37	9	—
Werder Bremen	2004–05	Bundesliga	10	1	3	0	1	0	0	0	14	1	
Werder Bremen	2005–06	Bundesliga	7	0	3	2	6	0	1 (Note: Appearance in DFB-Ligapokal)	0	17	2	
Werder Bremen	2006–07	Bundesliga	28	9	1	0	12	0	1	0	42	9	
Werder Bremen	2007–08	Bundesliga	14	1	1	0	5	1	0	0	20	2	
Werder Bremen	2008–09	Bundesliga	18	2	2	0	8	0	—		28	2	
Werder Bremen	2009–10	Bundesliga	32	9	6	1	8	1	—		46	11	
Werder Bremen	2010–11	Bundesliga	29	3	2	0	7	0	—		38	3	
Werder Bremen	2011–12	Bundesliga	18	3	1	0	—		—		19	3	
Werder Bremen	2012–13	Bundesliga	28	11	1	0	—		—		29	11	
Werder Bremen	2013–14	Bundesliga	31	7	1	0	—		—		32	7	
Werder Bremen	Total		215	46	21	3	47	2	2	0	285	51	—
VfL Wolfsburg	2014–15	Bundesliga	15	2	2	0	5	2	—		22	4	
VfL Wolfsburg	2015–16	Bundesliga	2	0	0	0	0	0	0	0	0	0	
VfL Wolfsburg	Total		17	2	2	0	5	2	0	0	24	4	—
Hamburger SV	2015–16	Bundesliga	21	1	0	0	—		—		21	1	
Hamburger SV	2016–17	Bundesliga	22	4	4	0	—		—		26	4	
Hamburger SV	2017–18	Bundesliga	29	3	1	0	—		—		30	3	
Hamburger SV	2018–19	2. Bundesliga	22	5	2	0	—		—		24	5	
Hamburger SV	2019–20	2. Bundesliga	23	7	1	1	—		—		24	8	
Hamburger SV	2020–21	2. Bundesliga	27	5	1	0	—		—		28	5	
Hamburger SV	Total		144	25	9	1	—				153	26	—
Career total			413	82	32	4	52	4	2	0	499	90	—

== Honours ==
Werder Bremen

- DFB-Pokal: 2008–09
- DFB-Ligapokal: 2006
- UEFA Cup runner-up: 2008–09

VfL Wolfsburg

- DFB-Pokal: 2014–15
