= Clemens Fritz =

German footballer (born 1980)

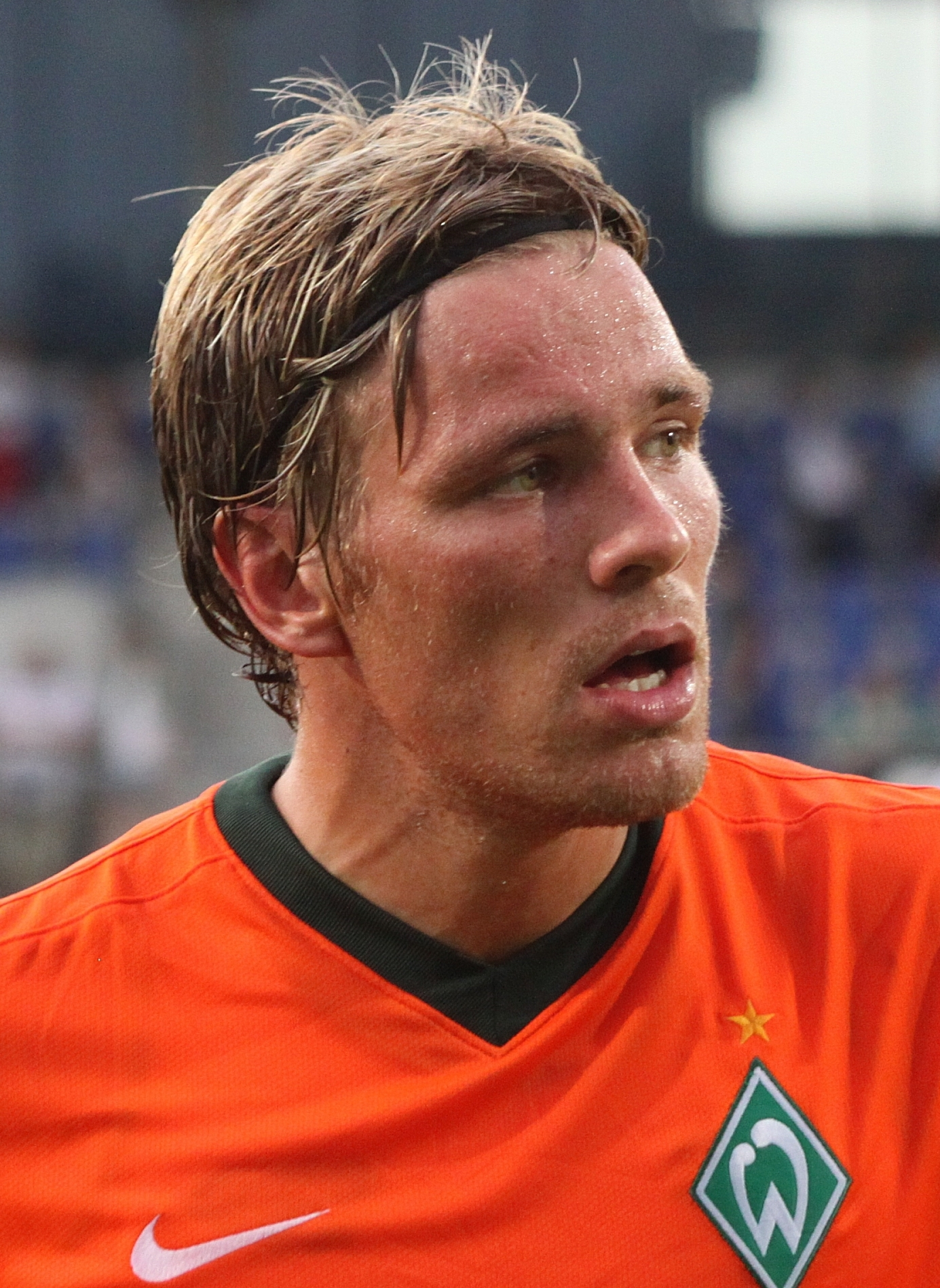
- Fritz playing for Werder in 2009

Personal information
- Date of birth: 7 December 1980 (age 45)
- Place of birth: Erfurt, East Germany
- Height: 1.83 m (6 ft 0 in)
- Positions: Right-back; defensive midfielder

Senior career*
Years	Team	Apps	(Gls)
1999–2001	Rot-Weiß Erfurt	57	(14)
2001–2003	Karlsruher SC	61	(7)
2003–2006	Bayer Leverkusen	43	(2)
2006–2017	Werder Bremen	288	(5)
Total		431	(28)

International career
2001	Germany U-21	1	(0)
2002	Germany Team 2006	1	(0)
2006–2008	Germany	22	(2)
- * Club domestic league appearances and goals

Clemens Fritz (born 7 December 1980) is a German former professional footballer who played as a right-back and as a defensive midfielder. He is mostly known for his 11-year spell at Werder Bremen.

Having begun his career at Rot-Weiß Erfurt and Karlsruher SC, he joined Bayer Leverkusen in 2003, playing sparingly across his three seasons at the Bundesliga club. In 2006, he moved to Werder Bremen, winning the DFB-Pokal and helping them to the UEFA Cup final in 2009. Across all competitions, he has played over 300 matches for Bremen.

In a two-year international career for Germany starting in 2006, he earned 22 caps and scored two goals. He was part of their team which finished as runners-up at UEFA Euro 2008.

He retired at the end of the 2016–17 season.

== Club career ==
=== Rot-Weiß Erfurt ===
Born in Erfurt, then in East Germany, Fritz started his footballing career playing for hometown club Rot-Weiß Erfurt in the Regionalliga.

=== Karlsruher SC ===
In the summer of 2001, he joined 2. Bundesliga club Karlsruher SC and scored five goals in 32 games. When he was signed by Bayer Leverkusen in 2003, he was loaned back to Karlsruhe to play first team football.

=== Bayer Leverkusen ===
He became part of Leverkusen's first team in the 2003–04 season second half after showing his capabilities for their reserve team. Fritz played 14 more first team games for Leverkusen that season, gaining them a UEFA Champions League place. In 2004, he broke his leg during a pre-season game against Rot-Weiss Essen, ruling him out the entire season.

=== Werder Bremen ===
In 2006, Fritz joined Werder Bremen on a free transfer, signing a three-year contract.

He announced his retirement at the end of the 2015–16 season on 14 January 2016, but signed a new one-year contract on 28 April 2016.

On 4 March 2017, in a match against Darmstadt 98, he suffered an ankle injury and underwent surgery, which ruled him out for the rest of the 2016–17 season. Having struggled with injuries towards the latter part of his career, he announced the end of his playing career on 8 May 2017.

== International career ==
Having played for the Germany U-18s and U-21s, Fritz debuted with the senior team on 7 October 2006, playing the entirety of a 2–0 friendly win over Georgia at the Ostseestadion in Rostock.

On 2 June of the following year, he scored his first international goal, concluding a 6–0 rout of minnows San Marino in UEFA Euro 2008 qualifying in Nuremberg, eight minutes after entering as a substitute. He added a second on 17 November, opening a 4–0 win over Cyprus in another qualifier in Hannover by heading in Lukas Podolski's cross after two minutes.

Fritz was selected in the 23-man squad for the European Championship in Austria and Switzerland in 2008. He played in the first four of their six games as they reached the final before defeat to Spain.

== Career statistics ==
=== Club ===
Appearances and goals by club, season and competition
Club	Season	League			Cup		Europe		Total	
Club	Season	Division	Apps	Goals	Apps	Goals	Apps	Goals	Apps	Goals
Rot-Weiß Erfurt	2000–01	Regionalliga Süd	32	10	1	0	–		33	10
Karlsruher SC	2001–02	2. Bundesliga	31	5	1	0	–		32	5
Karlsruher SC	2002–03	2. Bundesliga	30	2	1	0	–		31	2
Karlsruher SC	Total		61	7	2	0	–		63	7
Bayer Leverkusen	2003–04	Bundesliga	14	1	1	0	–		15	1
Bayer Leverkusen	2004–05	Bundesliga	0	0	0	0	1	0	1	0
Bayer Leverkusen	2005–06	Bundesliga	29	1	1	0	2	0	32	0
Bayer Leverkusen	Total		43	2	2	0	3	0	48	2
Werder Bremen	2006–07	Bundesliga	32	1	0	0	12	1	44	2
Werder Bremen	2007–08	Bundesliga	23	1	0	0	8	0	31	1
Werder Bremen	2008–09	Bundesliga	24	0	6	0	12	0	42	0
Werder Bremen	2009–10	Bundesliga	30	1	6	0	18	0	54	1
Werder Bremen	2010–11	Bundesliga	29	0	2	0	6	1	37	1
Werder Bremen	2011–12	Bundesliga	32	1	1	0	–		33	1
Werder Bremen	2012–13	Bundesliga	22	0	1	0	–		23	0
Werder Bremen	2013–14	Bundesliga	22	0	1	0	–		23	0
Werder Bremen	2014–15	Bundesliga	27	0	3	1	–		30	1
Werder Bremen	2015–16	Bundesliga	29	1	4	0	–		33	1
Werder Bremen	2016–17	Bundesliga	18	0	1	0	–		19	0
Werder Bremen	Total		288	5	25	1	56	2	369	8
Career total			406	24	29	1	59	2	494	27

=== International ===
Appearances and goals by national team and year
National team	Year	Apps	Goals
Germany	2006	3	0
Germany	2007	8	2
Germany	2008	11	0
Total		22	2

Scores and results list Germany's goal tally first, score column indicates score after each Fritz goal.

List of international goals scored by Clemens Fritz
No.	Date	Venue	Opponent	Score	Result	Competition
1	2 June 2007	Frankenstadion, Nuremberg, Germany	San Marino	6–0	6–0	UEFA Euro 2008 qualifying
2	17 November 2007	AWD Arena, Hannover, Germany	Cyprus	1–0	4–0	UEFA Euro 2008 qualifying

== Honours ==
Werder Bremen

- Bundesliga runner-up: 2007–08
- DFL-Ligapokal: 2006
- DFB-Pokal: 2008–09; runner-up 2009–10
- UEFA Cup: runner-up 2008–09

Germany U16

- UEFA European Under-16 Championship third place: 1997

Germany

- UEFA European Football Championship runner-up: 2008
