= Peter Sippel =

German football referee

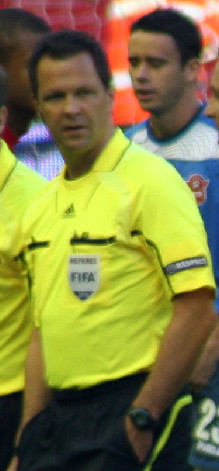
- Sippel in 2010
- Born: 6 October 1969 (age 57); Würzburg, West Germany
- Other occupation: Business administrator

Domestic
Years	League	Role
1996–2016	DFB	Referee
1997–2016	2. Bundesliga	Referee
2000–2016	Bundesliga	Referee

International
Years	League	Role
2003–2011	FIFA listed	Referee

Peter Sippel (born 6 October 1969) is a former German football referee who is based in Munich. He refereed for FC Würzburger Kickers of the Bavarian Football Association.

== Refereeing career ==
From 2004 until 2011, Peter Sippel has refereed quite a few European matches, mainly UEFA Cup matches and qualifiers.

Sippel retired from officiating in 2016 because of personal reasons. His final Bundesliga match officiated was between Darmstadt 98 and Borussia Mönchengladbach.

== Personal life ==
Sippel has a professional diploma in business administration, and lives in Munich.
