= 2010–11 FK Austria Wien season =

Austria Wien
2010–11 season
- Austrian Bundesliga: 3rd
- Austrian Cup: Quarterfinals
- Europa League: PO-Round

The 2010–11 season of Austria Wien was the 99th season in the club's history. They competed in the Austrian Bundesliga.

The club finished in third place in the league table.

== Matches ==
=== Legend ===
Win Draw Loss

=== Bundesliga ===
18 July 2010 Matchday 1	Austria Wien	2–0	SV Mattersburg	Vienna
18:30 CET	Liendl 12'; Linz 55'	Match Report		Stadium: Franz Horr Stadium; Attendance: 6,947; Referee: Dietmar Drabek

25 July 2010 Matchday 2	LASK Linz	3–4	Austria Wien	Linz
16:00 CET	Aufhauser 72', 74'; Mayrleb 84'	Match Report	Linz 32', 53'; Klein 38'; Ortlechner 77'	Stadium: Linzer Stadion; Attendance: 7,463; Referee: Thomas Einwaller

1 August 2010 Matchday 3	SC Wiener Neustadt	0–0	Austria Wien	Wiener Neustadt
16:00 CET		Match Report		Stadium: Stadion Wiener Neustadt; Attendance: 5,866; Referee: Thomas Prammer

8 August 2010 Matchday 4	Austria Wien	0–1	SV Ried	Vienna
18:30 CET		Match Report	Hackmair 73'	Stadium: Franz Horr Stadium; Attendance: 7,780; Referee: Alexander Harkam

21 August 2010 Matchday 5	Kapfenberger SV	1–1	Austria Wien	Kapfenberg
18:30 CET	Alar 4'	Match Report	Linz 19'	Stadium: Franz Fekete Stadion; Attendance: 5,926; Referee: Bernhard Brugger

29 August 2010 Matchday 6	Austria Wien	0–3	Wacker Innsbruck	Vienna
18:30 CET		Match Report	Schreter 68'; Perstaller 76'; Prokopič 80'	Stadium: Franz Horr Stadium; Attendance: 8,183; Referee: Oliver Drachta

12 September 2010 Matchday 7	Rapid Wien	0–1	Austria Wien	Vienna
16:00 CET		Match Report	Linz 63'	Stadium: Gerhard Hanappi Stadium; Attendance: 17,500; Referee: Robert Schörgenhofer

22 September 2010 Matchday 8	Austria Wien	0–0	Red Bull Salzburg	Vienna
20:30 CET		Match Report		Stadium: Franz Horr Stadium; Attendance: 9,700; Referee: Thomas Einwaller

25 September 2010 Matchday 9	Sturm Graz	0–2	Austria Wien	Graz
16:00 CET		Match Report	Junuzović 30', 64'	Stadium: UPC-Arena; Attendance: 11,431; Referee: Bernhard Brugger

2 October 2010 Matchday 10	Austria Wien	2–3	Sturm Graz	Vienna
18:30 CET	Hlinka 35'; Linz 71'	Match Report	Hölzl 12'; Szabics 74'; Kienast 80'	Stadium: Franz Horr Stadium; Attendance: 8,621; Referee: Thomas Gangl

17 October 2010 Matchday 11	SV Mattersburg	0–3	Austria Wien	Mattersburg
16:00 CET		Match Report	Stanković 15', 44'; Junuzović 71'	Stadium: Pappelstadion; Attendance: 4,985; Referee: Alexander Harkam

23 October 2010 Matchday 12	Austria Wien	4–1	LASK Linz	Vienna
18:30 CET	Hlinka 20'; Tadić 31', 35'; Stanković 85'	Match Report	Piermayr 47'	Stadium: Franz Horr Stadium; Attendance: 8,986; Referee: Manfred Krassnitzer

30 October 2010 Matchday 13	Austria Wien	1–1	SC Wiener Neustadt	Vienna
16:00 CET	Linz 15'	Match Report	Kostal 38'	Stadium: Franz Horr Stadium; Attendance: 8,325; Referee: Rene Eisner

6 November 2010 Matchday 14	SV Ried	2–1	Austria Wien	Ried im Innkreis
18:30 CET	Mader 17'; Royer 48'	Match Report	Linz 28'	Stadium: Keine Sorgen Arena; Attendance: 5,808; Referee: Christian Dintar

13 November 2010 Matchday 15	Austria Wien	5–1	Kapfenberger SV	Vienna
18:30 CET	Fukal 29' (o.g.); Linz 80'; Junuzović 82'; Baumgartlinger 86'; Suttner 89'	Match Report	Alar 90'	Stadium: Franz Horr Stadium; Attendance: 7,048; Referee: Bernhard Brugger

21 November 2010 Matchday 16	Wacker Innsbruck	0–1	Austria Wien	Innsbruck
16:00 CET		Match Report	Junuzović 52'	Stadium: Tivoli-Neu; Attendance: 10,263; Referee: Oliver Drachta

28 November 2010 Matchday 17	Austria Wien	0–1	Rapid Wien	Vienna
16:00 CET		Match Report	Salihi 51'	Stadium: Franz Horr Stadium; Attendance: 11,825; Referee: Louis Hofmann

4 December 2010 Matchday 18	Red Bull Salzburg	1–1	Austria Wien	Salzburg
18:30 CET	Mendes da Silva 28'	Match Report	Dragović 85'	Stadium: Red Bull Arena; Attendance: 5,500; Referee: Alexander Harkam

11 December 2010 Matchday 19	SV Mattersburg	1–2	Austria Wien	Mattersburg
16:00 CET	Pöllhuber 10'	Match Report	Tadić 43'; Stanković 77'	Stadium: Pappelstadion; Attendance: 4,061; Referee: Oliver Drachta

12 February 2011 Matchday 20	Austria Wien	1–0	SV Ried	Vienna
16:00 CET	Margreitter 61'	Match Report		Stadium: Franz Horr Stadium; Attendance: 9,001; Referee: Bernhard Brugger

19 February 2011 Matchday 21	Austria Wien	4–0	SC Wiener Neustadt	Vienna
18:30 CET	Linz 13', 90'; Suttner 64'; Barazite 71'	Match Report		Stadium: Franz Horr Stadium; Attendance: 7,659; Referee: Alexander Harkam

26 February 2011 Matchday 22	LASK Linz	0–4	Austria Wien	Linz
18:30 CET		Match Report	Liendl 9'; Barazite 37'; Junuzović 54'; Linz 90'	Stadium: Linzer Stadion; Attendance: 4,482; Referee: Rene Eisner

2 March 2011 Matchday 23	Austria Wien	2–2	Sturm Graz	Vienna
20:30 CET	Klein 73'; Ortlechner 79'	Match Report	Muratović 32'; Weinberger 47'	Stadium: Franz Horr Stadium; Attendance: 9,171; Referee: Oliver Drachta

5 March 2011 Matchday 24	Wacker Innsbruck	0–3	Austria Wien	Innsbruck
18:30 CET		Match Report	Jun 45'; Linz 60'; Junuzović 79'	Stadium: Tivoli-Neu; Attendance: 6,013; Referee: Thomas Gangl

13 March 2011 Matchday 25	Austria Wien	0–1	Rapid Wien	Vienna
16:00 CET		Match Report	Salihi 72'	Stadium: Franz Horr Stadium; Attendance: 112,200; Referee: Harald Lechner

20 March 2011 Matchday 26	Red Bull Salzburg	1–1	Austria Wien	Salzburg
16:00 CET	Dudić 8'	Match Report	Junuzović 51'	Stadium: Red Bull Arena; Attendance: 13,323; Referee: Robert Schörgenhofer

2 April 2011 Matchday 27	Austria Wien	2–0	Kapfenberger SV	Vienna
18:30 CET	Jun 75', 91'	Match Report		Stadium: Franz Horr Stadium; Attendance: 9,165; Referee: Manuel Schüttengruber

10 April 2011 Matchday 28	Kapfenberger SV	3–3	Austria Wien	Kapfenberg
18:30 CET	Alar 5'; Mavrič 33' (pen.); Felfernig 73'	Match Report	Linz 28', 65'; Stanković 75'	Stadium: Franz Fekete Stadion; Attendance: 3,957; Referee: Bernhard Brugger

16 April 2011 Matchday 29	Austria Wien	0–1	SV Mattersburg	Vienna
18:30 CET		Match Report	Waltner 53'	Stadium: Franz Horr Stadium; Attendance: 9,044; Referee: Rene Eisner

24 April 2011 Matchday 30	SV Ried	1–1	Austria Wien	Ried im Innkreis
16:00 CET	Hammerer 42'	Match Report	Linz 91'	Stadium: Keine Sorgen Arena; Attendance: 6,557; Referee: Robert Schörgenhofer

30 April 2011 Matchday 31	SC Wiener Neustadt	4–2	Austria Wien	Wiener Neustadt
18:30 CET	Aigner 21', 46'; Šimkovič 54'; Grünwald 66'	Match Report	Stanković 17'; Tadić 72'	Stadium: Stadion Wiener Neustadt; Attendance: 4,200; Referee: Oliver Drachta

7 May 2011 Matchday 32	Austria Wien	5–0	LASK Linz	Vienna
16:00 CET	Liendl 53'; Linz 54', 69'; Tadić 88'; Barazite 91'	Match Report		Stadium: Franz Horr Stadium; Attendance: 9,373; Referee: Alexander Harkam

11 May 2011 Matchday 33	Sturm Graz	1–1	Austria Wien	Graz
20:30 CET	Kienast 37'	Match Report	Linz 40'	Stadium: UPC-Arena; Attendance: 15,255; Referee: Thomas Gangl

14 May 2011 Matchday 34	Austria Wien	1–0	Wacker Innsbruck	Vienna
18:30 CET	Jun 54'	Match Report		Stadium: Franz Horr Stadium; Attendance: 9,307; Referee: Manfred Krassnitzer

22 May 2011 Matchday 35	Rapid Wien	0–3	Austria Wien	Vienna
16:00 CET	Match awarded to Austria after suspension	Match Report		Stadium: Gerhard Hanappi Stadium; Attendance: 17,500; Referee: Thomas Einwaller

25 May 2011 Matchday 36	Austria Wien	2–4	Red Bull Salzburg	Vienna
20:30 CET	Linz 32'; Barazite 73'	Match Report	Jantscher 33'; Alan 76', 83'; Wallner 79'	Stadium: Franz Horr Stadium; Attendance: 11,200; Referee: Robert Schörgenhofer

==== League table ====
Pos	Team	Pld	W	D	L	GF	GA	GD	Pts	Qualification or relegation
1	Sturm Graz (C)	36	19	9	8	66	33	+33	66	Qualification to Champions League second qualifying round
2	Red Bull Salzburg	36	17	12	7	53	31	+22	63	Qualification to Europa League second qualifying round
3	Austria Wien	36	17	10	9	65	37	+28	61	Qualification to Europa League second qualifying round
4	Ried	36	16	10	10	51	38	+13	58	Qualification to Europa League third qualifying round (Note: As winners of the 2010–11 Austrian Cup.)
5	Rapid Wien	36	14	11	11	52	42	+10	53 (Note: According to the competition rules of the Austrian FA, Rapid will always be ranked below any club with equal points due to the forced suspension of a match by the club.)	

Source: weltfussball.de (in German)
Rules for classification: 1) points; 2) goal difference; 3) number of goals scored.
(C) Champions

=== ÖFB-Cup ===
14 August 2010 round 1	SG SV Neuhofen/SV Ried Reserves	0–3	Austria Wien	Ried im Innkreis
19:00 CET		Match Report	Linz 32'; Stanković 57', 68'	Stadium: Keine Sorgen Arena; Referee: Thorsten Obwurzer

18 September 2010 Round 2	Kapfenberger SV II	0–3	Austria Wien	Kapfenberg
16:00 CET		Match Report	Stanković 42'; Linz 59'; Junuzović 71'	Stadium: Sportplatz SV Austria Kapfenberg Schirmitz; Attendance: 520; Referee: Dieter Muckenhammer

10 November 2010 Round 3	Austria Wien	2–1 (a.e.t.)	Wacker Innsbruck	Vienna
19:00 CET	Stanković 18'; Ortlechner 103'	Match Report	Schreter 21' 65'	Stadium: Franz Horr Stadium; Attendance: 3,000; Referee: Thomas Prammer

19 April 2011 Quarterfinals	Austria Wien	0–4	Austria Lustenau	Vienna
19:00 CET	Liendl 12'; Linz 55'	Match Report	Roth 21', 36'; Pöllhuber 49'; Karatay 65'	Stadium: Franz Horr Stadium; Attendance: 2,312; Referee: Markus Hameter

=== UEFA Europa League ===
15 July 2010 Second Qualifying Round First Leg	Austria Wien	2–2	Široki Brijeg	Vienna, Austria
20:30 CET	Linz 50'; Schumacher 57'	Match Report	Wagner 26'; Topić 54'	Stadium: Franz Horr Stadium; Referee: Artyom Kuchin (Kazakhstan)

22 July 2010 Second Qualifying Round Second Leg	Široki Brijeg	0–1	Austria Wien	Široki Brijeg, Bosnia-Herzegovina
18:00 CET		Match Report	Junuzović 80'	Stadium: Stadion Pecara; Referee: César Muñiz Fernández (Spain)

=== 3rd Round ===
Team 1	Agg.	Team 2	1st leg	2nd leg
Ruch Chorzów (Poland)	1–6	Austria Wien	1–3	0–3

29 July 2010
18:00

Ruch Chorzów (Poland)	1–3	Austria Wien
Pulkowski 4'	Report	Linz 8'; Hlinka 43'; Jun 73'

Stadion Miejski, Chorzów
Attendance: 8,000
Referee: Michael Koukoulakis (Greece)

=== Play-off-round ===
Team 1	Agg.	Team 2	1st leg	2nd leg
Aris (Greece)	2–1	Austria Wien	1–0	1–1
