= 2010–11 Austrian Cup =

2010–11 Austrian FA Cup
Öfb Cup (German)

Tournament details
- Country: Austria
- Teams: 64 (first round)

Final positions
- Champions: SV Ried
- Runners-up: Austria Lustenau
- UEFA Europa League: SV Ried

Tournament statistics
- Top goal scorer: Hamdi Salihi (6)

The 2010–11 Austrian Cup (German: ÖFB-Cup) was the 77th season of Austria's nationwide football cup competition. It commenced with the matches of the preliminary round in July 2010 and concluded with the Final on 29 May 2011. The winners of the competition qualified for the third qualifying round of the 2011–12 UEFA Europa League.

== Preliminary round ==
The Preliminary Round involved 68 amateur clubs from all regional federations, divided into smaller groups according to the Austrian federal states. The draw for this round was conducted in Vienna on 7 July 2010. After the draw, SV Bad Aussee had to withdraw from the competition after going into administration, earning their opponents USV Allerheiligen a walkover. The remaining thirty-three matches were played between mid-July and 1 August 2009, with the winners of these matches advancing to the first round.

Team 1	Score	Team 2
23 July 2010
SVG Bleiburg	0–2	SV Austria Klagenfurt
24 July 2010
FC Höchst	3–0	FC Hard
SV Seekirchen 1945	1–0	TSV St. Johann im Pongau
SV Bad Aussee	w/o	USV Allerheiligen
25 July 2010
SK Sturm Graz II	2–0	SC Weiz
27 July 2010
SC Rheindorf Altach II	2–2 (a.e.t.) (2–4 p)	FC Dornbirn 1913
WSG Wattens	3–1	Union Innsbruck
FC Wacker Innsbruck II	5–0	SC Schwaz
SVG Reichenau	3–0	SPG Axams/Götzens
SV Austria Salzburg	2–0	TSV Neumarkt
UFC SV Hallwang	2–2 (a.e.t.) (2–3 p)	FC Red Bull Salzburg II
SK Treibach	0–1	SAK Klagenfurt
SV Feldkirchen	3–1	FC Lendorf
30 July 2010
ASK Voitsberg	3–2	Grazer AK
SVL Flavia Solva	0–6	Kapfenberger SV II
DSV Leoben	2–3	SV Union Gleinstätten
FC Wels	1–2	SPG Neuhofen Ried
LASK Linz II	2–1	Union Dietach
FC Blau-Weiß Linz	3–1	SV Bad Ischl
Union Vöcklamarkt	2–1	FC Pasching
Union St. Florian	1–3	SV Sierning
SKU Amstetten	4–1	FC Admira Wacker Mödling II
SC Zwettl	0–2	SC Retz
SV Langenrohr	0–4	SV Horn
SV Stegersbach	2–1	ASKÖ Stinatz
SK Rapid Wien II	5–0	Admira Technopool
Wiener Sportklub	0–1	FK Austria Wien II
SV Mattersburg II	1–0	SV Neuberg
1. SC Sollenau	2–1	UFC Purbach
31 July 2010
USC Wallern	3–1	ASK Horitschon
SV Würmla	1–6	FC Waidhofen/Ybbs
SV Gaflenz	3–1	FC Mistelbach
1 August 2010
1. Simmeringer SC	3–4 (a.e.t.)	Favoritner AC
FAC Team für Wien	4–2	FC Stadlau

== First round ==
The draw for this round was conducted on 3 August 2010. The draw involved the 34 winners of the preliminary round, the 20 professional teams from the 2010–11 Bundesliga and First League, SC-ESV Parndorf 1919 as losing team of the 2009–10 Regionalliga promotion play-offs and nine regional cup winners. The matches of this round were played between 12 and 17 August 2010.

Team 1	Score	Team 2
12 August 2010
SV Mattersburg II	0–1	FK Austria Wien II
13 August 2010
SV Sierning	1–3	TSV Hartberg
SKN St. Pölten II	1–4	FC Red Bull Salzburg
SC Bregenz	1–2	FC Lustenau 07
WSG Wattens	1–2	First Vienna FC
FC Wacker Innsbruck II	3–5	SV Grödig
FAC Team für Wien	1–2	Kapfenberger SV
SV Seekirchen 1945	3–2	Post SV Wien
FC Kufstein	4–4 (a.e.t.) (5–4 p)	USK Anif
SC-ESV Parndorf 1919	4–0	SV Feldkirchen
SV Horn	1–2	SK Sturm Graz
SKU Amstetten	2–1	FC Trenkwalder Admira
1. SC Sollenau	4–2	Favoritner AC
14 August 2010
SVG Reichenau	0–8	SC Rheindorf Altach
FC Dornbirn 1913	1–0	SC Wiener Neustadt
SAK Klagenfurt	2–2 (a.e.t.) (4–6 p)	WAC St. Andrä
SV Austria Salzburg	0–3	SC Austria Lustenau
SK Rapid Wien II	2–5	SK Rapid Wien
SC Retz	2–2 (a.e.t.) (4–6 p)	FC Gratkorn
SV Gaflenz	2–1	FC Illmitz
ASK Voitsberg	7–1	USC Wallern
Kapfenberger SV II	3–1	LASK Linz II
FC Höchst	1–1 (a.e.t.) (5–4 p)	FC Red Bull Salzburg II
Union Vöcklamarkt	0–3	Fußballclub Wacker Innsbruck
SK Vorwärts Steyr	1–0	SKN St. Pölten
SV Union Gleinstätten	5–3	Villacher SV
TUS Paldau	1–4	FC Waidhofen/Ybbs
SV Austria Klagenfurt	1–2	LASK Linz
SPG Neuhofen Ried	0–3	FK Austria Wien
15 August 2010
SK Sturm Graz II	0–5	SV Ried
17 August 2010
USV Allerheiligen	2–3	FC Blau-Weiß Linz
SV Stegersbach	1–5	SV Mattersburg

== Second round ==
The draw for this round was conducted on 18 August 2010. The draw involved the 32 winners of the first round. The matches of this round were played on 16–18 September 2010.

Team 1	Score	Team 2
16 September 2010
Amstetten	0–2	Rheindorf Altach
17 September 2010
Dornbirn 1913	1–2	Mattersburg
Waidhofen/Ybbs	0–4	Ried
Kufstein	0–3	Grödig
Seekirchen 1945	2–6	Hartberg
Vorwärts Steyr	3–2	WAC St. Andrä
Kapfenberger SV	3–1	Gratkorn
Sollenau	2–4	LASK Linz
18 September 2010
Kapfenberger SV II	0–3	Austria Wien
Voitsberg	0–1	First Vienna
Höchst	0–3	Austria Lustenau
Gaflenz	1–5	Wacker Innsbruck
Parndorf 1919	1–2	Sturm Graz
19 September 2010
Blau-Weiß Linz	3–1	Red Bull Salzburg
FK Austria Wien II	1–1 (a.e.t.) (4–5 p)	Rapid Wien
20 September 2010
Union Gleinstätten	2–4	Lustenau 07

== Third round ==
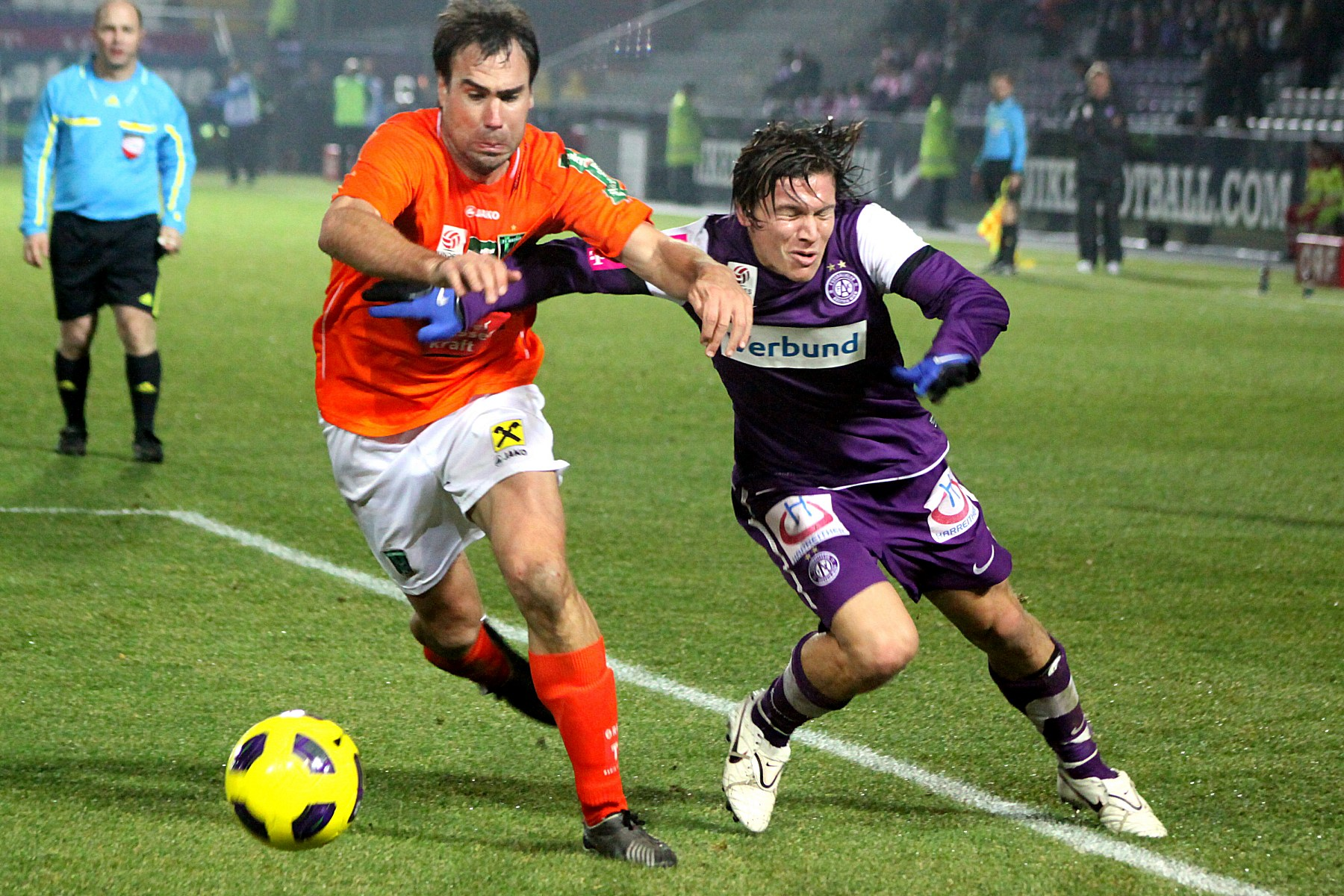
Austria Wien vs. Wacker Innsbruck 2:1: Iñaki Bea Jauregi (left) against Marko Stanković.

The 16 winners from the previous round competed in this stage of the competition.

Team 1	Score	Team 2
9 November 2010
Austria Lustenau	0–0 (a.e.t.) (5–4 p)	Grödig
First Vienna	2–1 (a.e.t.)	Rheindorf Altach
Kapfenberger SV	2–0 (a.e.t.)	Lustenau 07
LASK Linz	0–1	Ried
10 November 2010
Austria Wien	2–1 (a.e.t.)	Wacker Innsbruck
Rapid Wien	3–0	Hartberg
Blau-Weiß Linz	0–1	Mattersburg
Vorwärts Steyr	0–1 (a.e.t.)	Sturm Graz

== Quarter-finals ==
19 April 2011	Austria Wien	0–4	Austria Lustenau	Vienna
19:00 CET			Roth 21', 36'; Soares 48'; Karatay 65'	Stadium: Franz Horr Stadium

19 April 2011	First Vienna	0–2	Kapfenberger SV	Vienna
20:30 CET			Pavlov 65'; Wendler 90+3'; Welnicki (yellow card) 56' (yellow-red card) 90'	Stadium: Hohe Warte Stadium; Referee: Thomas Prammer

20 April 2011	Ried	2–1	Sturm Graz	Ried im Innkreis
18:15 CET	Royer 17'; Hadžić 90+4'		Glasner 90+5' (o.g.)	Stadium: Fill Metallbau Stadion; Referee: Bernhard Brugger

20 April 2011	Rapid Wien	2–0	Mattersburg	Hütteldorf
20:30 CET	Vennegoor of Hesselink 11'; Katzer 89'			Stadium: Gerhard Hanappi Stadium; Referee: Alexander Harkam

== Semi-finals ==
4 May 2011	Ried	2–1	Rapid Wien	Ried im Innkreis
CET	Hammerer 72'; Lexa 84'		Salihi 36'	Stadium: Fill Metallbau Stadion

3 May 2011	Kapfenberger SV	1–2	Austria Lustenau	Kapfenberg
CET	Schönberger 39'		Roth 16'; Boller 35'	Stadium: Franz-Fekete-Stadion

== Final ==
29 May 2011
16:30 CET

Ried	2–0	Austria Lustenau
Hammerer 42', 68'

Ernst-Happel-Stadion, Vienna
Attendance: 14,500
Referee: Manfred Krassnitzer

== See also ==
- 2010–11 Bundesliga
- 2010–11 First League
