= Lukas Hinterseer =

Austrian footballer (born 1991)

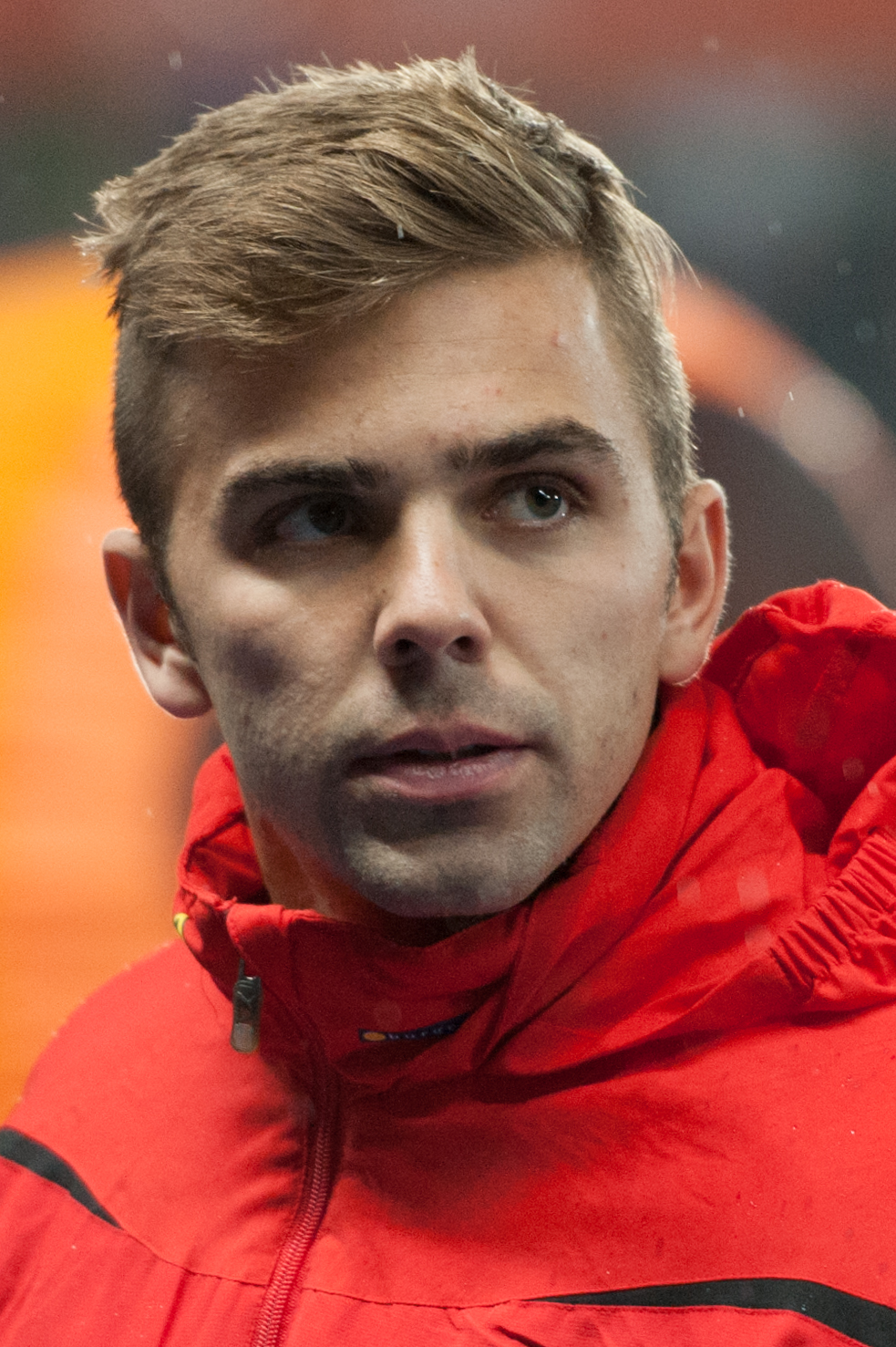
- Hinterseer with Austria in 2014

Personal information
- Full name: Lukas Hinterseer
- Date of birth: 28 March 1991 (age 35)
- Place of birth: Kitzbühel, Austria
- Height: 1.92 m (6 ft 4 in)
- Position: Forward

Team information
- Current team: WSG Tirol
- Number: 16

Youth career
- 2001–2008: FC Kitzbühel
- 2008–2009: Wacker Innsbruck

Senior career*
Years	Team	Apps	(Gls)
2008–2011	Wacker Innsbruck II	62	(27)
2009–2014	Wacker Innsbruck	60	(18)
2012	→ Lustenau (loan)	15	(3)
2012	→ First Vienna (loan)	18	(2)
2014–2017	FC Ingolstadt	88	(18)
2017–2019	VfL Bochum	62	(32)
2019–2021	Hamburger SV	33	(9)
2021	Ulsan Hyundai	20	(6)
2021–2022	Hannover 96	16	(0)
2022–2024	Hansa Rostock	29	(2)
2024	Hansa Rostock II	0	(0)
2024–	WSG Tirol	51	(5)

International career^{‡}
2007	Austria U17	3	(0)
2008	Austria U18	1	(0)
2009	Austria U19	3	(0)
2013–2019	Austria	13	(0)
- * Club domestic league appearances and goals as of 10 June 2026 ‡ National team caps and goals as of 17 January 2021

Lukas Hinterseer (born 28 March 1991) is an Austrian professional footballer who plays as a forward for WSG Tirol.

Born in Kitzbühel, Tyrol, Hinterseer began his career at local club FC Kitzbühel before signing for FC Wacker Innsbruck in 2008. After initially struggling to make the first team, he experienced a breakthrough in the 2013–14 season. His form earned him a move to German football, where he played for FC Ingolstadt, VfL Bochum, Hamburger SV, Hannover 96 and Hansa Rostock.

Hinterseer made his senior debut for Austria in November 2013 after previously being capped by Austria youth teams at under-17, under-18 and under-19 levels. He was chosen in Austria's squad for the UEFA Euro 2016.

== Club career ==
=== Early years ===
Lukas Hinterseer, nephew of famous alpine skier and singer Hansi Hinterseer and grandson of Olympic slalom winner Ernst Hinterseer, began his active career as a football player relatively late at the age of ten with his home club, FC Kitzbühel.

There, he progressed through all youth levels before receiving an offer from FC Wacker Innsbruck, joining the youth academy of the club based in the Tyrol capital. He played most of the 2008–09 season with the Wacker U19 team, but also appeared for the club's second team, which at that time was still competing in the fourth-tier Tiroler Liga. There, the Kitzbühel native gained his first experience in senior football and sat on the bench on 9 August 2008 in a 1–2 away win over Innsbrucker AC. In his following match with the first team, Hinterseer eventually made his debut, on 11 October 2008 in a 0–0 draw against SV Längenfeld, where he made the start and was replaced in the 81st minute by Daniel Niederjaufner.

In his third appearance in the second team, he scored a goal in a 9–0 win over SC Kirchberg on 21 March 2009. In the remainder of the season, he scored goals in wins over SK Jenbach and SV Längenfeld again. He finished the season with 11 appearances for the second team in which he scored four goals, as Wacker Innsbruck II won the championship title in the fourth tier. The team, which suffered only one defeat in the entire season, had already secured promotion a few matchdays before the end.

=== Wacker Innsbruck ===
==== Professional debut ====
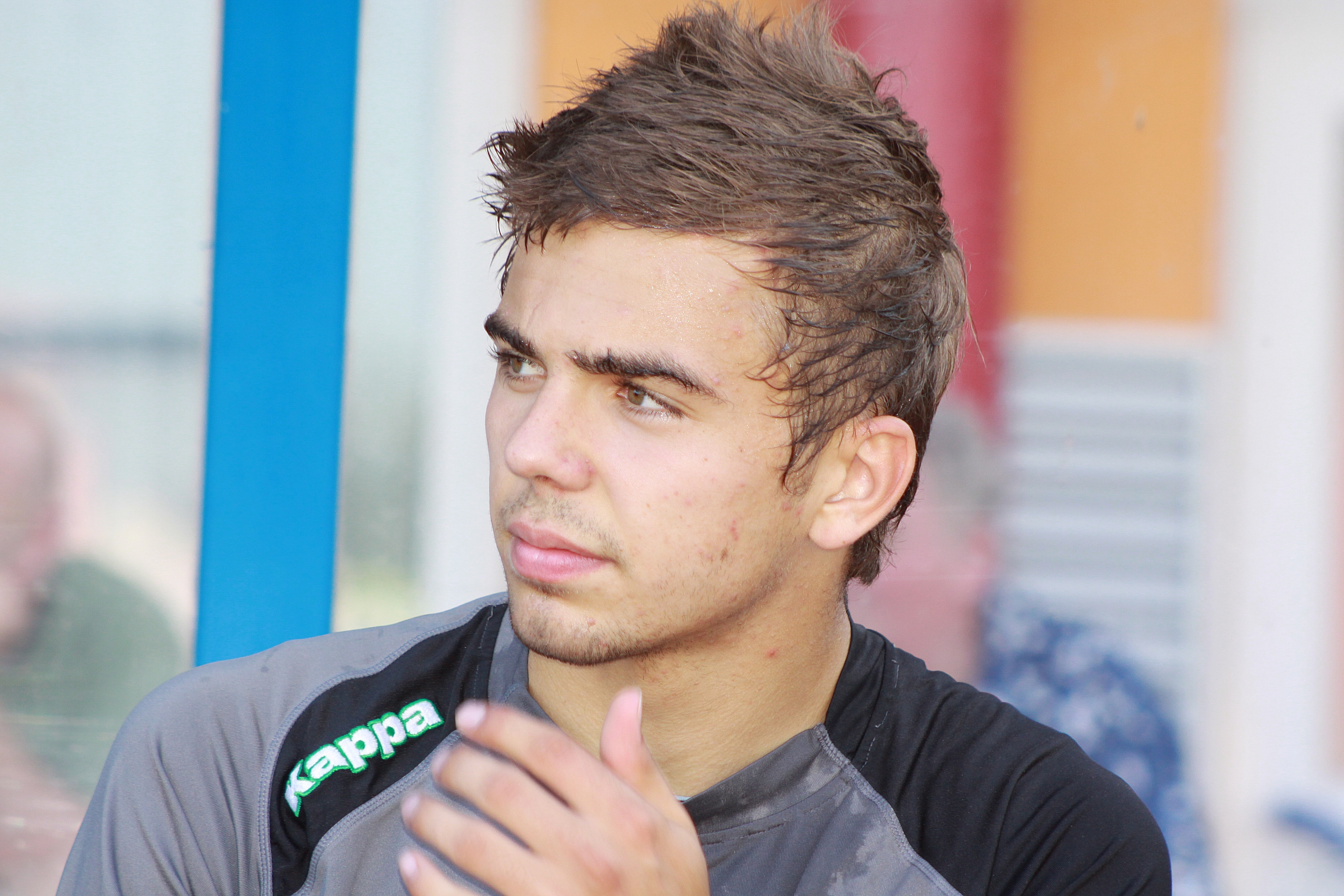
Hinterseer with FC Wacker Innsbruck in 2009

At the beginning of the 2009–10 season, Hinterseer signed his first professional contract with Wacker Innsbruck, after which he would play sporadically for the professional outfit, but also still make appearances with the amateur second team. After promotion was reached to the Austrian Regionalliga West, the striker became a feared goalscorer for the second team, where he scored seven goals in a total of 19 Regionalliga appearances. He also made his professional debut in the second-tier Austrian Football First League for the Wacker first team against the Red Bull Salzburg reserve team, FC Liefering, on 14 July 2009. In the match, he came on as a substitute for fellow striker Markus Unterrainer in the 71st minute. This was followed by a further seven first team league appearances for Hinterseer over the season, where he came on as a substitute player and mostly only appeared for a few minutes of play. In a 0–3 away win over FC Dornbirn on 20 March 2010, his longest showing of the season occurred at just under half an hour, in which he managed to score his first professional goal in the 69th minute.

In his last appearance in the Second League on 9 April 2010, he scored the only goal of the game with a 1–0 home win over FC Lustenau 07 in the 94th minute of the match after pass from Georg Harding. At the end of the 2009–10 season, he achieved promotion to the Austrian Football Bundesliga with Wacker again, after their relegation in the 2007–08 season. At the end of the season, being two points ahead of FC Admira Wacker Mödling was eventually enough for their renewed promotion to the Bundesliga.

In the 2010–11 season, Hinterseer could also not really assert himself in the first team and only made three short Bundesliga appearances. He made his Bundesliga debut exactly one year after his last professional appearance, on 9 April 2011 in a 1–0 win over Wiener Neustadt. In the match, he came on as a substitute in the 90th minute for his striker colleague Julius Perstaller.

Only in the last two rounds of the season did head coach Walter Kogler utilise him more than hitherto. On 22 May 2011, he made a 38-minute appearance against LASK (1–0 win) when he came on as a substitute for Perstaller. Hinterseer was also used as the sole striker in the season finale against SK Sturm Graz, which saw Sturm become the 2010–11 Austrian Football Bundesliga champions. In this encounter, he recorded his first appearance in the starting lineup of the first team, before he was replaced in the 56th minute by Carlos Merino. Parallel to his tenure with the first team, he made 20 appearances for the second team in the Regionalliga West, in which he scored eight goals as Wacker II achieved a midtable finish.

==== Loans to Lustenau and First Vienna ====
After struggling to make the first team regularly, Hinterseer was sent on loans to FC Lustenau 07 in spring 2012 and later First Vienna FC for fall 2012.

==== Return to Innsbruck ====
After his return from First Vienna in January 2013, Hinterseer developed into a regular starter for Wacker Innsbruck and was able to contribute with six goals in total (3 goals, 3 assists) in 13 appearances. In the 2013–14 season he finally became a key player of the team; mainly used in attacking midfield and as a false 9. Due to his convincing performances, national team coach Marcel Koller called him up for the Austria national team.

=== Germany ===
On 6 May 2014, Lukas Hinterseer signed a three-year contract with FC Ingolstadt 04 in the German Bundesliga. He scored the winning goal to make it 1–0 in the 66th minute on 15 August 2015 in an away match against 1. FSV Mainz 05, he scored his first, as well as Ingolstadt's first, Bundesliga goal. On 5 April 2016, he extended his contract until 2017.

After the end of the 2016–17 season, and the relegation of Ingolstadt to the 2. Bundesliga, Hinterseer's contract was not extended, and he subsequently joined fellow second-tier club VfL Bochum on a free transfer. There, he made his debut in a 1–1 draw against MSV Duisburg on 5 August 2017, the second matchday of the 2017–18 season. In a 5–2 win against FC Nöttingen in the first main round of the 2017–18 DFB-Pokal on 13 August 2017, he scored his first three competitive goals for Bochum. His contract, which expired at the end of the 2018–19 2. Bundesliga season, was not renewed. He finished his stint at Bochum with 32 goals in 62 league appearances, on average scoring in every second game for the club.

On 25 May 2019, Hinterseer joined Hamburger SV on a two-year deal.

=== Ulsan Hyundai ===
On 22 January 2021, Hinterseer signed with K League club Ulsan Hyundai.

=== Hannover 96 ===
After half a year in South Korea, Hinterseer returned to Germany and signed a two-year contract with 2. Bundesliga club Hannover 96.

=== Hansa Rostock ===
On 21 July 2022, Hinterseer transferred to Hansa Rostock on a two-year contract.

== International career ==
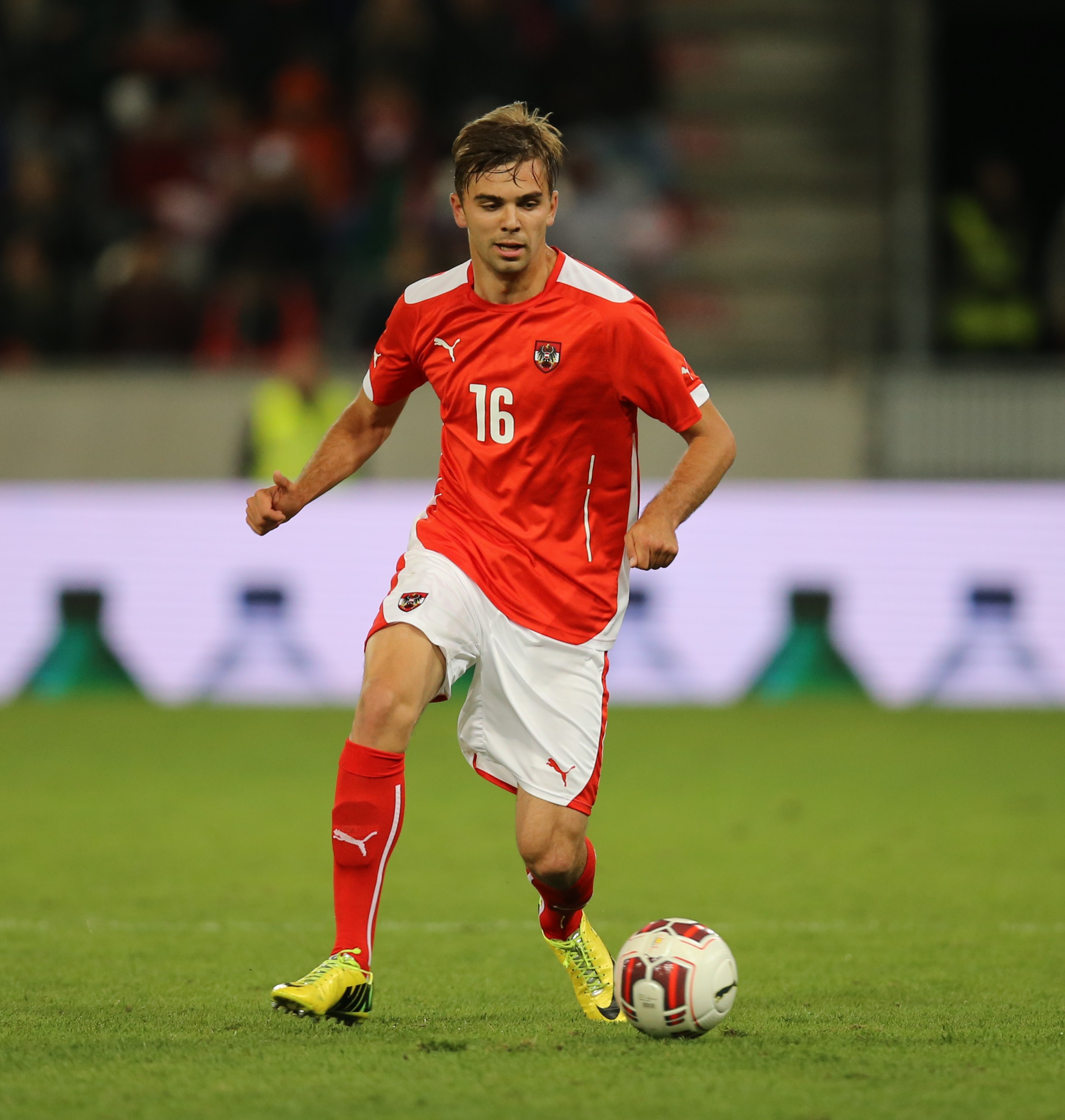
Hinterseer 2014 in a match against Iceland

Austria under-17 coach Paul Gludovatz selected Hinterseer for the U17 squad while he was still in Kitzbühel. With the team he took part in the Toto Youth Cup in 2007. There, he was used in the various matches and was able to defend the title with the Austrians at the end of the competition. In the following year, the striker was regularly called up for the Austria under-18 team, although under coach Andreas Heraf he was mostly only called up and later not included in the official team. Furthermore, Hinterseer was called up for the Austria U19 squad, although he did not contribute as a regular.

After his definitive breakthrough in the 2013–14 season, he made his debut for the senior team under national team coach Marcel Koller in a 1–0 win over the United States on 19 November 2013.

For the UEFA Euro 2016 in France, Hinterseer was named in Austria's 23-man squad. He made his only tournament appearance in the 0–0 draw against Portugal in the second game, when he came on as a substitute in the final minutes. Austria were knocked out of the tournament in the group stage.

== Personal life ==
Lukas Hinterseer is the grandson of former Olympic champion and World Cup winner, alpine skier Ernst Hinterseer and also the nephew of singer and former alpine skier Hansi Hinterseer.

== Career statistics ==
As of match played 16 May 2026

Appearances and goals by club, season and competition
Club	Season	League			Cup		Continental		Other		Total	
Club	Season	Division	Apps	Goals	Apps	Goals	Apps	Goals	Apps	Goals	Apps	Goals
Wacker Innsbruck II	2008–09	Tiroler Liga	11	4	—		—		—		11	4
Wacker Innsbruck II	2009–10	Regionalliga West	19	4	—		—		—		19	4
Wacker Innsbruck II	2010–11	Regionalliga West	20	8	1	0	—		—		21	8
Wacker Innsbruck II	2011–12	Regionalliga West	12	8	—		—		—		12	8
Wacker Innsbruck II	Total		62	24	1	0	—		—		63	24
Wacker Innsbruck	2009–10	Austrian First League	8	2	0	0	—		—		8	2
Wacker Innsbruck	2010–11	Austrian Bundesliga	3	0	0	0	—		—		3	0
Wacker Innsbruck	2011–12	Austrian Bundesliga	2	0	1	2	—		—		3	2
Wacker Innsbruck	Total		13	2	1	2	—		—		14	4
Lustenau (loan)	2011–12	Austrian First League	15	3	0	0	—		—		15	3
First Vienna (loan)	2012–13	Austrian First League	18	2	1	0	—		—		19	2
Wacker Innsbruck	2012–13	Austrian Bundesliga	13	3	0	0	—		—		13	3
Wacker Innsbruck	2013–14	Austrian Bundesliga	34	13	2	0	—		—		36	13
Wacker Innsbruck	Total		47	16	2	0	—		—		49	16
FC Ingolstadt	2014–15	2. Bundesliga	32	9	1	0	—		—		33	9
FC Ingolstadt	2015–16	Bundesliga	28	6	1	0	—		—		29	6
FC Ingolstadt	2016–17	Bundesliga	28	3	1	0	—		—		29	3
FC Ingolstadt	Total		88	18	3	0	—		—		91	18
VfL Bochum	2017–18	2. Bundesliga	31	14	2	3	—		—		33	17
VfL Bochum	2018–19	2. Bundesliga	31	18	1	0	—		—		32	18
VfL Bochum	Total		62	32	3	3	—		—		65	35
Hamburger SV	2019–20	2. Bundesliga	29	9	2	1	—		—		31	10
Hamburger SV	2020–21	2. Bundesliga	4	0	1	0	—		—		5	0
Hamburger SV	Total		33	9	3	1	—		—		36	10
Ulsan Hyundai	2021	K League 1	20	6	0	0	6 (Note: Appearances in the AFC Champions League)	3	2 (Note: Appearances in the FIFA Club World Cup)	0	28	9
Hannover 96	2021–22	2. Bundesliga	16	0	0	0	—		—		16	0
Hansa Rostock	2022–23	2. Bundesliga	22	2	1	0	—		—		23	2
Hansa Rostock	2023–24	2. Bundesliga	7	0	1	0	—		—		8	0
Hansa Rostock	Total		29	2	2	0	—		—		31	2
WSG Tirol	2024–25	Austrian Bundesliga	23	3	1	0	—		—		24	3
WSG Tirol	2025–26	Austrian Bundesliga	28	2	2	2	—		—		30	4
WSG Tirol	Total		51	5	3	2	—		—		54	7
Career total			454	117	19	8	6	3	2	0	481	130

== Honours ==
Wacker Innsbruck II

- Tiroler Liga (IV): 2008–09

Wacker Innsbruck

- First League (II): 2009–10

FC Ingolstadt

- 2. Bundesliga (II): 2014–15
