= Austrian 2. Landesliga =

- Country: Austria
- Level on pyramid: 5
- Promotion to: Landesliga
- Relegation to: Oberliga
- Current: 2024-25 Austrian 2. Landesliga

The Austrian 2. Landesliga is the fifth tier of football in Austria. It is divided among the Austrian states by one or more conferences. The champions of each conference are promoted to the Landesliga.

== Conferences ==
- Burgenland: 2. Liga Nord, 2. Liga Mitte and 2. Liga Süd
- Lower Austria: 2. Landesliga Ost and 2. Landesliga West
- Wien: 2. Landesliga
- Carinthia and East Tyrol: Unterliga Ost and Unterliga West
- Upper Austria: Landesliga Ost and Landesliga West
- Styria: Oberliga Nord, Oberliga Mitte West and Oberliga Süd Ost
- Salzburg: 2. Landesliga Nord and 2. Landesliga Süd
- Tyrol (without East Tyrol): Landesliga Ost and Landesliga West
- Vorarlberg: Landesliga
