= Hammerer =

Hammerer is a surname. Notable people with the surname include:

- Hubert Hammerer (1925–2017), Austrian sport shooter
- Markus Hammerer (born 1989), Austrian footballer
- Resi Hammerer (1925–2010), Austrian alpine skier
- Véronique Hammerer (born 1968), French politician

== See also ==
- Hammer (disambiguation)
