= 2010–11 Austrian Football Bundesliga =

99th season of top-tier football league in Austria

Austrian Bundesliga
- Season: 2010–11
- Dates: 17 July 2010 – 25 May 2011
- Champions: Sturm Graz
- Relegated: LASK Linz
- Champions League: Sturm Graz
- Europa League: Red Bull Salzburg; Austria Vienna
- Matches: 180
- Goals: 467 (2.59 per match)
- Top goalscorer: Roman Kienast (14 goals)
- Biggest home win: W. Neustadt 5–0 LASK
- Biggest away win: LASK 0–4 A. Vienna
- Highest scoring: Mattersburg 1–4 Ried; W. Neustadt 5–0 LASK

The 2010–11 Austrian Football Bundesliga season is the 99th edition of top-tier football in Austria for the Austrian Cup. The competition was officially called tipp3-Bundesliga powered by T-Mobile, named after the Austrian betting company tipp3 and the Austrian branch of German mobile phone company T-Mobile. The season began in July 2010 and ended in May 2011.

Red Bull Salzburg unsuccessfully defended its sixth Austrian Football Bundesliga title.

Sturm Graz successfully pursued its 2011 Austrian Football Bundesliga title.

== Teams ==
Austria Kärnten were relegated after finishing the 2009–10 season in 10th and last place. They were replaced by First League champions Wacker Innsbruck.

Location of teams in the 2010–11 Austrian Football Bundesliga

Team	City/Area	Venue	Capacity
Austria Wien	Vienna	Franz Horr Stadium	13,000
Kapfenberger SV	Kapfenberg	Franz-Fekete-Stadion	12,000
LASK	Linz	Linzer Stadion	14,100
SV Mattersburg	Mattersburg	Pappelstadion	15,700
Rapid Wien	Vienna	Gerhard-Hanappi-Stadion	18,442
Red Bull Salzburg	Salzburg	Red Bull Arena	30,188
SV Ried	Ried im Innkreis	Keine Sorgen Arena	7,700
Sturm Graz	Graz	UPC-Arena	15,312
Wacker Innsbruck	Innsbruck	Tivoli Neu	16,008
SC Wiener Neustadt	Wiener Neustadt	Stadion Wiener Neustadt	10,000

== League table ==
Pos	Team	Pld	W	D	L	GF	GA	GD	Pts	Qualification or relegation
1	Sturm Graz (C)	36	19	9	8	66	33	+33	66	Qualification to Champions League second qualifying round
2	Red Bull Salzburg	36	17	12	7	53	31	+22	63	Qualification to Europa League second qualifying round
3	Austria Wien	36	17	10	9	65	37	+28	61	Qualification to Europa League second qualifying round
4	Ried	36	16	10	10	51	38	+13	58	Qualification to Europa League third qualifying round (Note: As winners of the 2010–11 Austrian Cup.)
5	Rapid Wien	36	14	11	11	52	42	+10	53 (Note: According to the competition rules of the Austrian FA, Rapid will always be ranked below any club with equal points due to the forced suspension of a match by the club.)	
6	Wacker Innsbruck	36	13	11	12	43	42	+1	50	
7	Wiener Neustadt	36	14	8	14	44	52	−8	50	
8	Kapfenberger SV	36	9	11	16	42	61	−19	38	
9	Mattersburg	36	7	10	19	29	56	−27	31	
10	LASK Linz (R)	36	3	10	23	22	75	−53	19	Relegation to Austrian Football First League

Source: weltfussball.de (in German)
Rules for classification: 1) points; 2) goal difference; 3) number of goals scored.
(C) Champions; (R) Relegated

== Results ==
Teams played each other four times in the league. In the first half of the season each team played every other team twice (home and away), and then did the same in the second half of the season.

=== First half of season ===
Home \ Away	AWI	KAP	LIN	MAT	RWI	RBS	RIE	STU	WKR	WN
Austria Wien		5–1	4–1	2–0	0–1	0–0	0–1	2–3	0–3	1–1
Kapfenberger SV	1–1		4–1	3–1	0–0	0–0	3–3	0–4	2–4	1–2
LASK Linz	3–4	0–1		0–1	1–0	1–2	0–3	0–4	0–0	2–1
Mattersburg	0–3	0–1	3–3		2–2	1–0	1–4	1–1	0–2	0–3
Rapid Wien	0–1	3–2	5–0	2–0		2–1	3–0	3–1	1–1	1–2
Red Bull Salzburg	1–1	0–2	0–0	1–0	1–1		1–0	2–0	4–0	4–2
Ried	2–1	1–0	1–0	1–3	3–1	1–2		0–3	1–0	2–0
Sturm Graz	0–2	2–0	5–0	2–0	0–2	0–0	0–1		2–0	4–2
Wacker Innsbruck	0–1	1–3	2–0	2–1	4–0	0–1	1–0	2–2		0–0
Wiener Neustadt	0–0	3–0	5–0	1–0	1–1	1–0	0–5	0–3	1–0	

Source: weltfussball.de (in German)
Legend: Blue = home team win; Yellow = draw; Red = away team win.

=== Second half of season ===
Home \ Away	AWI	KAP	LIN	MAT	RWI	RBS	RIE	STU	WKR	WN
Austria Wien		2–0	5–0	0–1	0–1	2–4	1–0	2–2	1–0	4–0
Kapfenberger SV	3–3		2–2	2–1	1–1	0–1	2–1	0–5	0–0	0–1
LASK Linz	0–4	0–3		0–1	1–2	1–1	1–1	0–2	0–1	2–3
Mattersburg	1–2	1–1	1–1		1–0	0–1	2–2	1–1	2–1	1–1
Rapid Wien	0–3 (Note: The match between Rapid Vienna and Austria Vienna was awarded to Austria by a score of 3–0. The original match had been suspended after 26 minutes and a 2–0 lead for Austria when Rapid supporters stormed the pitch.)	2–0	0–0	0–0		1–2	2–0	0–2	3–3	4–1
Red Bull Salzburg	1–1	4–2	0–1	2–0	1–1		2–2	2–1	2–3	4–0
Ried	1–1	2–0	2–0	1–1	2–1	2–2		0–0	2–2	1–0
Sturm Graz	1–1	2–0	1–1	4–0	3–3	0–3	1–0		2–1	1–0
Wacker Innsbruck	0–3	1–1	1–0	2–0	0–3	1–1	1–1	1–0		1–0
Wiener Neustadt	4–2	1–1	0–0	2–1	2–0	1–0	0–2	1–2	2–2	

Source: weltfussball.de (in German)
Legend: Blue = home team win; Yellow = draw; Red = away team win.

== Top goalscorers ==
Including matches played on 25 May 2011; Source:Austrian Bundesliga

Rank	Player	Club	Goals
1	(Austria) Roland Linz	Austria Vienna	21
2	(Austria) Roman Kienast	Sturm Graz	19
3	(Albania) Hamdi Salihi	Rapid Vienna	18
3	(Austria) Roman Wallner	Red Bull Salzburg	18
5	(Austria) Deni Alar	Kapfenberger SV	14
5	(Austria) Patrick Bürger	SV Mattersburg	14
7	(Austria) Johannes Aigner	Wiener Neustadt	11
8	(Austria) Marcel Schreter	Wacker Innsbruck	10
8	(Brazil) Alan Carvalho	Red Bull Salzburg	10
10	(Hungary) Imre Szabics	Sturm Graz	9
10	(Spain) Guillem	SV Ried	9
10	(Austria) Zlatko Junuzovic	Austria Vienna	9
10	(Bosnia and Herzegovina) Samir Muratovic	Sturm Graz	9

== Attendances ==
#	Club	Average
1	Rapid	15,825
2	Sturm	11,811
3	Salzburg	10,799
4	Wacker	9,432
5	Austria	9,085
6	LASK	6,099
7	Ried	5,249
8	Mattersburg	4,363
9	Wiener Neustadt	3,634
10	Kapfenberg	3,232

== See also ==
- 2010–11 Austrian Cup
- 2010–11 Austrian Football First League
