= Landesliga West (Tyrol) =

- Country: Austria
- Confederation: Austrian Football Association
- Number of clubs: 14
- Level on pyramid: 5
- Promotion to: Tiroler Liga
- Relegation to: Gebietsliga West
- Current champions: SV Längenfeld (2022-23)

The Landesliga West is, together with the Landesliga Ost, the second-highest division of Tyrol and the fifth-highest division in Austrian football. The champions advance into the Tiroler Liga. In the 2015/16 season, FC Zirl was able to secure the championship.

== 2023–24 member clubs ==
- SV Götzens
- SV Haiming
- SpG Innsbruck West
- SV Innsbruck
- SV Landeck
- SV Matrei
- SV Reutte
- SK Rum
- FG Schönwies/Mils
- FC Stubai
- SV Thaur
- FC Wipptal
- SV Zams
- FC Zirl
Location of teams in 2023–24 Landesliga West (Tyrol)
