= 2016–17 SV Werder Bremen season =

Werder Bremen
2016–17 season
- President: Hubertus Hess-Grunewald
- Head coach: Viktor Skrypnyk (until 18 September); Alexander Nouri (interim, 18 September–2 October; head coach, from 2 October)
- Stadium: Weser-Stadion
- Bundesliga: 8th
- DFB-Pokal: First round
- Top goalscorer: League: Max Kruse (15); All: Max Kruse (15)
- Highest home attendance: 42,100
- Lowest home attendance: 37,108
- Average home league attendance: 40,946
- Biggest win: Bremen 3–0 Leipzig; Freiburg 2–5 Bremen; Bremen 3–0 Schalke
- Biggest defeat: Bayern 6–0 Bremen
Home colours	Away colours	Third colours

The 2016–17 SV Werder Bremen season is the 107th season in the club's football history. In 2016–17 the club plays in the Bundesliga, the top tier of German football league system. It is the clubs 34th consecutive season in this league, having been promoted from the 2. Bundesliga in 1981.

The club also is taking part in the 2016–17 edition of the DFB-Pokal.

== Players ==
=== Squad ===
Note: Flags indicate national team as defined under FIFA eligibility rules; some limited exceptions apply. Players may hold more than one non-FIFA nationality.

No.	Pos.	Nation	Player
1	GK	GER	Raphael Wolf
2	DF	ARG	Santiago García
3	DF	ITA	Luca Caldirola
4	DF	GER	Robert Bauer
5	MF	MLI	Sambou Yatabaré
6	MF	DEN	Thomas Delaney
7	MF	AUT	Florian Kainz
8	MF	GER	Clemens Fritz (Captain)
9	FW	USA	Aron Jóhannsson
10	FW	GER	Max Kruse
13	DF	SRB	Miloš Veljković
14	FW	PER	Claudio Pizarro
15	MF	BIH	Izet Hajrović
16	MF	AUT	Zlatko Junuzović (Vice-captain)
17	FW	GER	Justin Eilers
18	DF	FIN	Niklas Moisander

No.	Pos.	Nation	Player
19	DF	GER	Luca-Milan Zander
20	DF	SUI	Ulisses Garcia
22	MF	GER	Fin Bartels
23	DF	CZE	Theodor Gebre Selassie
24	FW	GER	Johannes Eggestein
26	DF	SEN	Lamine Sané
27	MF	AUT	Florian Grillitsch
28	FW	UGA	Melvyn Lorenzen
29	FW	GER	Serge Gnabry
30	GK	GER	Michael Zetterer
33	GK	CZE	Jaroslav Drobný
35	MF	GER	Maximilian Eggestein
42	GK	GER	Felix Wiedwald
44	MF	GER	Philipp Bargfrede
47	FW	GAM	Ousman Manneh

=== Transfers ===
==== In ====
No.	Pos.	Name	Age	EU	Moving from	Type	Transfer Window	Contract ends	Transfer fee	Sources
3	Defender	Luca Caldirola	25	Yes	Darmstadt 98	Return from loan	Summer	30 June 2017	—	
4	Defender	Robert Bauer	21	Yes	FC Ingolstadt	Transfer	Summer	30 June 2020	€2.5 million	
7	Midfielder	Florian Kainz	23	Yes	Rapid Wien	Transfer	Summer	30 June 2020	€3.5 million	
10	Forward	Max Kruse	28	Yes	VfL Wolfsburg	Transfer	Summer	30 June 2019	€7.5 million	
11	Forward	Lennart Thy	24	Yes	FC St. Pauli	Transfer	Summer	30 June 2019	Free	
15	Midfielder	Izet Hajrović	24	Yes	Eibar	Return from loan	Summer	30 June 2018	—	
17	Midfielder	Justin Eilers	28	Yes	Dynamo Dresden	Transfer	Summer	30 June 2019	Free	
18	Defender	Niklas Moisander	30	Yes	Sampdoria	Transfer	Summer	30 June 2019	€1.8 million	
21	Defender	Fallou Diagne	26	Yes	Rennes	Transfer	Summer	30 June 2019	€1.5 million	
25	Midfielder	Athanasios Petsos	25	Yes	Rapid Wien	Transfer	Summer	30 June 2019	Free	
26	Defender	Lamine Sané	29	Yes	Bordeaux	Transfer	Summer	30 June 2019	Free	
29	Forward	Serge Gnabry	21	Yes	Arsenal	Transfer	Summer	30 June 2019	€5 million	
33	Goalkeeper	Jaroslav Drobný	36	Yes	Hamburger SV	Transfer	Summer	30 June 2017	Free	
6	Midfielder	Thomas Delaney	25	Yes	F.C. Copenhagen	Transfer	Winter	30 June 2021	€2 million	
—	Midfielder	László Kleinheisler	22	Yes	Darmstadt 98	End of loan	Winter	30 June 2019	—	

==== Out ====
No.	Pos.	Name	Age	EU	Moving to	Type	Transfer Window	Transfer fee	Sources
3	Defender	Papy Djilobodji	27	No	Chelsea	End of loan	Summer	—	
4	Defender	Álex Gálvez	27	Yes	Eibar	Transfer	Summer	€1.5 million	
6	Midfielder	László Kleinheisler	22	Yes	Darmstadt 98	Loan	Summer	—	
7	Defender	Jannik Vestergaard	23	Yes	Borussia Mönchengladbach	Transfer	Summer	€12.5 million	
11	Midfielder	Levin Öztunalı	20	Yes	Bayer Leverkusen	End of loan	Summer	—	
15	Defender	Mateo Pavlović	26	Yes	Angers	Transfer	Summer	Free	
17	Midfielder	Özkan Yıldırım	23	Yes	Fortuna Düsseldorf	Transfer	Summer	Free	
18	Goalkeeper	Gerhard Tremmel	37	Yes	Swansea City	End of loan	Summer	—	
21	Forward	Anthony Ujah	25	No	Liaoning Whowin	Transfer	Summer	€11.5 million	
25	Defender	Oliver Hüsing	23	Yes	Ferencváros	Transfer	Summer	€300,000	
38	Defender	Marnon Busch	21	Yes	1860 Munich	Loan	Summer	—	
—	Midfielder	Felix Kroos	25	Yes	Union Berlin (previously on loan)	Transfer	Summer	€500,000	
11	Forward	Lennart Thy	24	Yes	FC St. Pauli	Loan	Winter	—	
21	Defender	Fallou Diagne	27	Yes	Metz	Loan	Winter	€400,000	
37	Defender	Janek Sternberg	24	Yes	Ferencváros	Transfer	Winter	Undisclosed	
39	Midfielder	Lukas Fröde	21	Yes	Würzburger Kickers	Transfer	Winter	€200,000	
—	Midfielder	László Kleinheisler	22	Yes	Ferencváros	Loan	Winter	—	
25	Midfielder	Athanasios Petsos	25	Yes	Fulham	Loan	Winter	—	

== Friendly matches ==
Win Draw Loss

12 July 2016 Friendly	VSG Altglienicke	1–2	Werder Bremen	Berlin, Germany
18:30 CEST (UTC+2)	Stüwe 52'	Report	Diagne 43'; Hajrović 66'	Stadium: Fritz-Lesch-Sportplatz; Attendance: 3,600; Referee: Max Burda

16 July 2016 Friendly	Neuruppin-Stadtauswahl	0–8	Werder Bremen	Neuruppin, Germany
12:00 CEST (UTC+2)		Report	Hajrović 3'; J. Eggestein 20', 59', 77'; Manneh 62'; Jacobsen 82'; Schmidt 83', 86'	Stadium: Volksparkstadion; Attendance: 1,400; Referee: Andy Stolz

16 July 2016 Friendly	VfB Lübeck	1–1	Werder Bremen	Lübeck, Germany
18:30 CEST (UTC+2)	Büyükdemir 88'	Report	Bartels 6'	Stadium: Stadion Lohmühle; Attendance: 4,655; Referee: Viatcheslav Paltchikov

23 July 2016 Friendly	Werder Bremen	1–2	1860 Munich	Zell am Ziller, Austria
15:00 CEST (UTC+2)	Mölders 18' (o.g.)	Report	Mugoša 33'; Degenek 39'	Stadium: Parkstadion Zell am Ziller; Attendance: 1,500; Referee: Christoph Schiefer (Austria)

26 July 2016 Friendly	Werder Bremen	0–0	Huddersfield Town	Zell am Ziller, Austria
18:00 CEST (UTC+2)		Report		Stadium: Parkstadion Zell am Ziller; Referee: Stefan Gamper (Austria)

7 August 2016 Friendly	Werder Bremen	2–4	Chelsea	Bremen, Germany
15:00 CEST (UTC+2)	Pizarro 33' (pen.); Thy 65'	Report	Hazard 7'; Oscar 8'; Diego Costa 45'; Pedro 90'	Stadium: Weser-Stadion; Attendance: 23,611; Referee: Sven Jablonski

10 August 2016 Friendly	SV Meppen	0–2	Werder Bremen	Meppen, Germany
19:00 CEST (UTC+2)		Report	J. Eggestein 66'; Yatabaré 87'	Stadium: Hänsch-Arena; Attendance: 5,385; Referee: Lukas Benen

13 August 2016 Friendly	Werder Bremen	1–0	FC Ingolstadt	Lohne, Germany
15:30 CEST (UTC+2)	Bartels 42'	Report		Stadium: Heinz-Dettmer-Stadion; Attendance: 3,000; Referee: Frank Willenborg

2 September 2016 Friendly	Kickers Emden	1–8	Werder Bremen	Emden, Germany
19:00 CEST (UTC+2)	Bloem 33'	Report	Thy 7', 39'; Jóhannsson 14', 16', 42', 84', 89'; Bartels 36'	Stadium: Ostfriesland-Stadion; Attendance: 3,273; Referee: Jan Lammers

=== Dresden Cup ===
Pos	Team	Pld	W	L	GF	GA	GD	Pts	Final result
1	(Spain) Real Betis	2	2	0	2	1	+1	8	2016 Osnabrück Football Summer Champions
2	(Germany) Dynamo Dresden (H)	2	1	1	3	2	+1	6	
3	(Germany) Werder Bremen	2	1	1	1	2	−1	4	
4	(England) Everton	2	0	2	2	3	−1	2	

Source: Dynamo Dresden
Rules for classification: 1) Points; 2) Goal difference; 3) Head to head result
(H) Hosts

29 July 2016 1	Werder Bremen	0–1	Real Betis	Dresden, Germany
18:00 CEST (UTC+2)		Report	Nahuel 67'	Stadium: DDV-Stadion; Attendance: 2,000

30 July 2016 2	Dynamo Dresden	1–1 (3–4 p)	Werder Bremen	Dresden, Germany
16:00 CEST (UTC+2)	Kutschke 82'	Report	J. Eggestein 87'	Stadium: DDV-Stadion; Attendance: 13,852; Referee: Steffen Mix
	Penalties
	Kutschke (penalty scored); Väyrynen (penalty scored); Hilßner (penalty missed); Kreuzer (penalty missed); Hartmann (penalty scored)		(penalty scored) Sternberg; (penalty scored) Hajrović; (penalty missed) U. Garcia; (penalty scored) Petsos; (penalty scored) J. Eggestein

== Competitions ==
Win Draw Loss

=== Overview ===
Competition	First match	Last match	Starting round	Final position	Record							
Competition	First match	Last match	Starting round	Final position	Pld	W	D	L	GF	GA	GD	Win %
Bundesliga	26 August 2016	20 May 2017	Matchday 1	8th	34	13	6	15	61	64	−3	38.24
DFB-Pokal	21 August 2016	21 August 2016	First round	First round	1	0	0	1	1	2	−1	0.00
Total					35	13	6	16	62	66	−4	37.14

Last updated: 27 May 2017
Source: Competitions

=== Bundesliga ===
==== League table ====
Pos	Team	Pld	W	D	L	GF	GA	GD	Pts	Qualification or relegation
6	Hertha BSC	34	15	4	15	43	47	−4	49	Qualification for the Europa League group stage (Note: Since the winners of the 2016–17 DFB-Pokal, Borussia Dortmund, qualified for the Champions League based on league position, the Europa League group stage spot was passed to the sixth-placed team, Hertha BSC; and the Europa League third qualifying round spot was passed to the seventh-placed team, SC Freiburg.)
7	SC Freiburg	34	14	6	14	42	60	−18	48	Qualification for the Europa League third qualifying round
8	Werder Bremen	34	13	6	15	61	64	−3	45	
9	Borussia Mönchengladbach	34	12	9	13	45	49	−4	45	
10	Schalke 04	34	11	10	13	45	40	+5	43	

Source: DFB
Rules for classification: 1) Points; 2) Goal difference; 3) Goals scored; 4) Head-to-head points; 5) Head-to-head goal difference; 6) Head-to-head away goals scored; 7) Away goals scored; 8) Play-off.

==== Results summary ====
Overall								Home						Away					
Pld	W	D	L	GF	GA	GD	Pts	W	D	L	GF	GA	GD	W	D	L	GF	GA	GD
34	13	6	15	61	64	−3	45	8	1	8	28	24	+4	5	5	7	33	40	−7

Last updated: 27 May 2017.
Source: Bundesliga

==== Results by round ====
Round	1	2	3	4	5	6	7	8	9	10	11	12	13	14	15	16	17	18	19	20	21	22	23	24	25	26	27	28	29	30	31	32	33	34
Ground	A	H	A	H	H	A	H	A	H	A	H	A	H	A	H	A	H	H	A	H	A	A	H	A	H	A	H	A	H	A	H	A	H	A
Result	L	L	L	L	W	D	W	L	L	L	L	D	W	W	D	D	L	L	L	L	W	W	W	D	W	W	W	D	W	W	W	L	L	L
Position	18	18	18	18	15	15	13	15	15	16	16	16	14	14	14	15	15	15	15	16	16	15	14	15	13	12	11	11	8	7	6	8	8	8

Updated to match(es) played on 27 May 2017. Source: Bundesliga
A = Away; H = Home; W = Win; D = Draw; L = Loss

==== Matches ====
26 August 2016 1	Bayern Munich	6–0	Werder Bremen	Munich
20:30 CEST (UTC+2)	Alonso 9'; Lewandowski 13', 46', 77' (pen.); Lahm 66'; Ribéry 73'	Report	Sternberg (yellow card) 87'	Stadium: Allianz Arena; Attendance: 75,000; Referee: Christian Dingert

11 September 2016 2	Werder Bremen	1–2	FC Augsburg	Bremen
15:30 CEST (UTC+2)	Fritz (yellow card) 10'; Gebre Selassie (yellow card) 25'; Jóhannsson 45+2' (pen.)	Report	Stafylidis (yellow card) 15', (goal) 73'; Gouweleeuw 52', (yellow card) 56'; Caiuby (yellow card) 87'	Stadium: Weser-Stadion; Attendance: 39,430; Referee: Daniel Siebert

17 September 2016 3	Borussia Mönchengladbach	4–1	Werder Bremen	Mönchengladbach
18:30 CEST (UTC+2)	Hazard 11', 17'; Raffael 21' (pen.), 41'	Report	Fritz (yellow card) 22'; Grillitsch (yellow card) 59'; Gnabry 73'; Jóhannsson (red card) 80'; Sané (yellow card) 86'	Stadium: BORUSSIA-PARK; Attendance: 54,014; Referee: Tobias Stieler

21 September 2016 4	Werder Bremen	1–2	Mainz 05	Bremen
20:00 CEST (UTC+2)	Hajrović 12'; Manneh (yellow card) 24'; Grillitsch (yellow card) 88'	Report	Frei (yellow card) 71'; Mallı 87'; de Blasis 90+2', (yellow card) 90+3'	Stadium: Weser-Stadion; Attendance: 37,108; Referee: Wolfgang Stark

24 September 2016 5	Werder Bremen	2–1	VfL Wolfsburg	Bremen
18:30 CEST (UTC+2)	Junuzović (yellow card) 61'; Thy 86'; Gebre Selassie 90+1'	Report	Bruma (yellow card) 26'; Seguin (yellow card) 40'; Horn (yellow card) 49'; Bauer 69' (o.g.)	Stadium: Weser-Stadion; Attendance: 40,153; Referee: Deniz Aytekin

1 October 2016 6	Darmstadt 98	2–2	Werder Bremen	Darmstadt
15:30 CEST (UTC+2)	Fedetskyi (yellow card) 12'; Čolak 19' (pen.), 73'; Sulu (yellow card) 38'	Report	Grillitsch (yellow card) 30'; Sané 51'; Gnabry 67'	Stadium: Jonathan-Heimes-Stadion am Böllenfalltor; Attendance: 17,000; Referee: Jochen Drees

15 October 2016 7	Werder Bremen	2–1	Bayer Leverkusen	Bremen
18:30 CEST (UTC+2)	Junuzović 13'; Hajrović (yellow card) 52'; Manneh 59', (yellow card) 90+1'	Report	Çalhanoğlu 27'; Aránguiz (yellow card) 55'; Wendell (yellow card) 69'	Stadium: Weser-Stadion; Attendance: 41,000; Referee: Marco Fritz

23 October 2016 8	RB Leipzig	3–1	Werder Bremen	Leipzig
15:30 CEST (UTC+2)	Kaiser (yellow card) 14'; Forsberg (yellow card) 23'; Keïta (yellow card) 32', (goal) 42', 74'; Demme (yellow card) 90+4'; Selke 90+5'	Report	Gebre Selassie (yellow card) 36'; Fritz (yellow card) 44'; Gnabry 76'; Moisander (yellow card) 90+4'	Stadium: Red Bull Arena; Attendance: 42,558; Referee: Robert Hartmann

29 October 2016 9	Werder Bremen	1–3	SC Freiburg	Bremen
15:30 CEST (UTC+2)	S. García (yellow card) 9', (goal) 67'	Report	Frantz (yellow card) 24'; Philipp 29', (yellow card) 68'; Grifo 39' (pen.); Abrashi 75'; Höfler (yellow card) 83'	Stadium: Weser-Stadion; Attendance: 41,500; Referee: Guido Winkmann

6 November 2016 10	Schalke 04	3–1	Werder Bremen	Gelsenkirchen
17:30 CET (UTC+1)	Schöpf 35', 63'; Bentaleb 38', (yellow card) 54'; Stambouli (yellow card) 84'	Report	Veljković (yellow card) 37'; Gnabry 42' (pen.); Petsos (yellow card) 43'; S. García (yellow card) 68'	Stadium: VELTINS-Arena; Attendance: 61,263; Referee: Günter Perl

20 November 2016 11	Werder Bremen	1–2	Eintracht Frankfurt	Bremen
17:30 CET (UTC+1)	Grillitsch 38'; Gnabry (yellow card) 73'	Report	Mascarell (yellow card) 24'; Meier 52'; Vallejo (yellow card) 62'; Barkok 90'	Stadium: Weser-Stadion; Attendance: 39,261; Referee: Robert Kampka

26 November 2016 12	Hamburger SV	2–2	Werder Bremen	Hamburg
15:30 CET (UTC+1)	Gregoritsch 3', 28'; Djourou (yellow card) 72'; Müller (yellow card) 88'	Report	Petsos (yellow card) 11'; Bartels 14'; Moisander (yellow card) 39'; Gnabry 45'; Bargfrede (yellow card) 70'	Stadium: Volksparkstadion; Attendance: 55,237; Referee: Felix Brych

3 December 2016 13	Werder Bremen	2–1	FC Ingolstadt	Bremen
15:30 CET (UTC+1)	Kruse 24'; Bartels 76'	Report	Tisserand (yellow card) 30'; Suttner 58', (yellow card) 90+4'; Groß (yellow card) 79'	Stadium: Weser-Stadion; Attendance: 38,438; Referee: Tobias Stieler

10 December 2016 14	Hertha BSC	0–1	Werder Bremen	Berlin
18:30 CET (UTC+1)		Report	Kruse 41', (yellow card) 81'; Bargfrede (yellow card) 62'; Fritz (yellow card) 64'	Stadium: Olympiastadion Berlin; Attendance: 51,337; Referee: Harm Osmers

17 December 2016 15	Werder Bremen	1–1	1. FC Köln	Bremen
15:30 CET (UTC+1)	Gnabry 40'; Jóhannsson (yellow card) 87'	Report	Modeste (yellow card) 25'; Rudņevs 28'; Guirassy (yellow card) 85'; Höger (yellow card) 89'; Hector (yellow card) 90+1'	Stadium: Weser-Stadion; Attendance: 42,100; Referee: Wolfgang Stark

21 December 2016 16	1899 Hoffenheim	1–1	Werder Bremen	Sinsheim
20:00 CET (UTC+1)	Wagner 26'; Hübner (yellow card) 77'; Schwegler (yellow card) 90+2'	Report	S. García (yellow card) 53'; Bartels (yellow card) 73'; Gnabry 87'	Stadium: WIRSOL Rhein-Neckar-Arena; Attendance: 29,076; Referee: Benjamin Cortus

21 January 2017 17	Werder Bremen	1–2	Borussia Dortmund	Bremen
15:30 CET (UTC+1)	Bauer (yellow card) 19'; Drobný (red card) 39'; Bartels 59'; Delaney (yellow card) 76'; S. García (yellow card) 84'	Report	Schürrle 5', (yellow card) 43'; Piszczek 71'	Stadium: Weser-Stadion; Attendance: 42,100; Referee: Daniel Siebert

28 January 2017 18	Werder Bremen	1–2	Bayern Munich	Bremen
15:30 CET (UTC+1)	Bauer (yellow card) 42'; Kruse 53'; S. García (yellow card) 72'; Junuzović (yellow card) 75'; M. Eggestein (yellow card) 90'	Report	Robben 30'; Alaba 45+1'; Coman (yellow card) 90+3'	Stadium: Weser-Stadion; Attendance: 42,100; Referee: Sascha Stegemann

5 February 2017 19	FC Augsburg	3–2	Werder Bremen	Augsburg
15:30 CET (UTC+1)	Schmid 28'; Kohr (yellow card) 49'; Hinteregger (yellow card) 64'; Koo 79'; Bobadilla 90+4', (yellow card) 90+4'	Report	Gebre Selassie 26'; U. Garcia (yellow card) 54'; Kruse 65' (pen.); Veljković (yellow card) 87'	Stadium: WWK ARENA; Attendance: 26,812; Referee: Christian Dingert

11 February 2017 20	Werder Bremen	0–1	Borussia Mönchengladbach	Bremen
15:30 CET (UTC+1)	Delaney (yellow card) 65'; Bauer (yellow card) 73'	Report	Hazard 12'; Jantschke (yellow card) 60'; Strobl (yellow card) 80'	Stadium: Weser-Stadion; Attendance: 42,100; Referee: Benjamin Brand

18 February 2017 21	Mainz 05	0–2	Werder Bremen	Mainz
15:30 CET (UTC+1)	Donati (yellow card) 39'; Latza (yellow card) 50'; Jairo (yellow card) 56'	Report	Gnabry 16'; Delaney 23'; Junuzović (yellow card) 25'; Gebre Selassie (yellow card) 44'; Fritz (yellow card) 76'; Wiedwald (yellow card) 90+2'	Stadium: OPEL ARENA; Attendance: 27,281; Referee: Deniz Aytekin

24 February 2017 22	VfL Wolfsburg	1–2	Werder Bremen	Wolfsburg
20:30 CET (UTC+1)	Mayoral 19'; Arnold (yellow card) 86'	Report	Gnabry 10', 18'; Bartels (yellow card) 45+1'; Wiedwald (yellow card) 69'; Sané (yellow card) 90+3'	Stadium: VOLKSWAGEN ARENA; Attendance: 30,000; Referee: Wolfgang Stark

4 March 2017 23	Werder Bremen	2–0	Darmstadt 98	Bremen
15:30 CET (UTC+1)	Kruse 75' (pen.), 90+2'; M. Eggestein (yellow card) 85'	Report	Altıntop (yellow card) 69'	Stadium: Weser-Stadion; Attendance: 41,000; Referee: Guido Winkmann

10 March 2017 24	Bayer Leverkusen	1–1	Werder Bremen	Leverkusen
20:30 CET (UTC+1)	Volland 7'; Wendell (yellow card) 20' (yellow-red card) 90'	Report	Gebre Selassie (yellow card) 66'; Pizarro 79', (yellow card) 80'	Stadium: BayArena; Attendance: 30,210; Referee: Tobias Stieler

18 March 2017 25	Werder Bremen	3–0	RB Leipzig	Bremen
15:30 CET (UTC+1)	Junuzović 34', (yellow card) 50'; Grillitsch 59'; Bauer (yellow card) 85'; Kainz 90'	Report	Orban (yellow card) 58'	Stadium: Weser-Stadion; Attendance: 41,384; Referee: Christian Dingert

1 April 2017 26	SC Freiburg	2–5	Werder Bremen	Freiburg im Breisgau
15:30 CEST (UTC+2)	Kempf (yellow card) 27'; Petersen 64'; Grifo 77'; Schuster (yellow card) 81'	Report	Kruse 21'; Delaney 45+2', 47', 85'; Bartels 71'; Caldirola (yellow card) 81'	Stadium: Schwarzwald-Stadion; Attendance: 24,000; Referee: Wolfgang Stark

4 April 2017 27	Werder Bremen	3–0	Schalke 04	Bremen
20:00 CEST (UTC+2)	Gebre Selassie 24'; Kruse 76' (pen.); M. Eggestein 80'	Report	Goretzka (yellow card) 73'; Fährmann (yellow card) 80'	Stadium: Weser-Stadion; Attendance: 42,100; Referee: Robert Hartmann

7 April 2017 28	Eintracht Frankfurt	2–2	Werder Bremen	Frankfurt
20:30 CEST (UTC+2)	Gaćinović 48'; Rebić (yellow card) 53'; Fabián 73' (pen.), (yellow card) 74'	Report	Veljković (yellow card) 7'; Junuzović 37'; Bartels 43', (yellow card) 69'	Stadium: Commerzbank-Arena; Attendance: 51,000; Referee: Bastian Dankert

16 April 2017 29	Werder Bremen	2–1	Hamburger SV	Bremen
15:30 CEST (UTC+2)	Junuzović (yellow card) 32'; Grillitsch (yellow card) 35'; Kruse 41'; Kainz 75'; Veljković (yellow card) 90+4'	Report	Gregoritsch 6'; Diekmeier (yellow card) 70'	Stadium: Weser-Stadion; Attendance: 42,100; Referee: Felix Brych

22 April 2017 30	FC Ingolstadt	2–4	Werder Bremen	Ingolstadt
15:30 CEST (UTC+2)	Lezcano 32'; Tisserand (yellow card) 45'; Groß 62' (pen.), (yellow card) 78'; Christiansen (yellow card) 70'	Report	Kruse 45+1' (pen.), 81', 87', 90+4'; Moisander (yellow card) 50'; Sané (yellow card) 64'	Stadium: Audi Sportpark; Attendance: 15,200; Referee: Markus Schmidt

29 April 2017 31	Werder Bremen	2–0	Hertha BSC	Bremen
15:30 CEST (UTC+2)	Bartels 9'; Kruse 15'; Moisander (yellow card) 23'	Report	Mittelstädt (yellow card) 28'	Stadium: Weser-Stadion; Attendance: 42,100; Referee: Patrick Ittrich

5 May 2017 32	1. FC Köln	4–3	Werder Bremen	Cologne
20:30 CEST (UTC+2)	Modeste 13', 47'; Bittencourt 28'; Zoller 44'	Report	Delaney (yellow card) 21'; Bartels 34'; Gebre Selassie 40'; Moisander (yellow card) 60'; Gnabry 62'	Stadium: RheinEnergieSTADION; Attendance: 50,000; Referee: Wolfgang Stark

13 May 2017 33	Werder Bremen	3–5	1899 Hoffenheim	Bremen
15:30 CEST (UTC+2)	Gebre Selassie 59'; Bauer (yellow card) 80', (goal) 90'; Bargfrede 86'	Report	Szalai 7'; Kramarić 11', 49'; Süle (yellow card) 12'; Zuber 40'; Bičakčić 51'	Stadium: Weser-Stadion; Attendance: 41,000; Referee: Daniel Siebert

20 May 2017 34	Borussia Dortmund	4–3	Werder Bremen	Dortmund
15:30 CEST (UTC+2)	Papastathopoulos (yellow card) 11'; Reus 32', 75' (pen.); Aubameyang 42', 89' (pen.); Dembélé (yellow card) 61'; Şahin (yellow card) 62'; Kagawa (yellow card) 87'	Report	Junuzović 7'; Bartels 46', (yellow card) 58'; Kruse 68'; Bargfrede (yellow card) 88'; Veljković (yellow card) 90+2'	Stadium: SIGNAL IDUNA PARK; Attendance: 81,360; Referee: Günter Perl

=== DFB-Pokal ===
21 August 2016 First round	Sportfreunde Lotte	2–1	Werder Bremen	Lotte
15:30 CEST (UTC+2)	Rahn 8', (yellow card) 42'; Pires-Rodrigues (yellow card) 22'; Dej 54'; Wendel (yellow card) 68'; Steinhart (yellow card) 81'	Report	Junuzović 45'; Fritz (yellow card) 68'; Sané (yellow card) 68'; Bartels (red card) 82'	Stadium: Sportpark am Lotter Kreuz; Attendance: 10,056; Referee: Christian Dietz

== Statistics ==
=== Appearances and goals ===
No.	Pos	Nat	Player	Total		Bundesliga		DFB-Pokal	
No.	Pos	Nat	Player	Apps	Goals	Apps	Goals	Apps	Goals
Goalkeepers
1	GK	(Germany) GER	Raphael Wolf	0	0	0	0	0	0
30	GK	(Germany) GER	Michael Zetterer	0	0	0	0	0	0
33	GK	(Czech Republic) CZE	Jaroslav Drobný	10	0	10	0	0	0
42	GK	(Germany) GER	Felix Wiedwald	26	0	24+1	0	1	0
Defenders
2	DF	(Argentina) ARG	Santiago García	19	1	16+3	1	0	0
3	DF	(Italy) ITA	Luca Caldirola	5	0	5	0	0	0
4	DF	(Germany) GER	Robert Bauer	27	1	25+2	1	0	0
13	DF	(Serbia) SRB	Miloš Veljković	26	0	20+6	0	0	0
18	DF	(Finland) FIN	Niklas Moisander	31	0	29+1	0	1	0
19	DF	(Germany) GER	Luca-Milan Zander	0	0	0	0	0	0
20	DF	(Switzerland) SUI	Ulisses Garcia	7	0	3+4	0	0	0
23	DF	(Czech Republic) CZE	Theodor Gebre Selassie	31	5	26+4	5	1	0
26	DF	(Senegal) SEN	Lamine Sané	28	1	27	1	1	0
Midfielders
5	MF	(Mali) MLI	Sambou Yatabaré	3	0	2	0	1	0
6	MF	(Denmark) DEN	Thomas Delaney	13	4	11+2	4	0	0
7	MF	(Austria) AUT	Florian Kainz	15	2	1+13	2	0+1	0
8	MF	(Germany) GER	Clemens Fritz	19	0	17+1	0	1	0
15	MF	(Bosnia and Herzegovina) BIH	Izet Hajrović	10	1	6+4	1	0	0
16	MF	(Austria) AUT	Zlatko Junuzović	31	5	28+2	4	1	1
22	MF	(Germany) GER	Fin Bartels	32	8	23+8	8	1	0
27	MF	(Austria) AUT	Florian Grillitsch	24	2	21+2	2	0+1	0
35	MF	(Germany) GER	Maximilian Eggestein	15	1	8+7	1	0	0
38	MF	(Germany) GER	Niklas Schmidt	1	0	0+1	0	0	0
44	MF	(Germany) GER	Philipp Bargfrede	11	1	4+7	1	0	0
Forwards
9	FW	(United States) USA	Aron Jóhannsson	9	1	2+7	1	0	0
10	FW	(Germany) GER	Max Kruse	24	15	23	15	1	0
14	FW	(Peru) PER	Claudio Pizarro	19	1	10+9	1	0	0
17	FW	(Germany) GER	Justin Eilers	0	0	0	0	0	0
24	FW	(Germany) GER	Johannes Eggestein	1	0	0	0	0+1	0
28	FW	(Uganda) UGA	Melvyn Lorenzen	0	0	0	0	0	0
29	FW	(Germany) GER	Serge Gnabry	27	11	23+4	11	0	0
47	FW	(The Gambia) GAM	Ousman Manneh	6	1	6	1	0	0
Players transferred out during the season
11	FW	(Germany) GER	Lennart Thy	7	1	0+6	1	1	0
21	DF	(Senegal) SEN	Fallou Diagne	2	0	2	0	0	0
25	MF	(Greece) GRE	Athanasios Petsos	3	0	2+1	0	0	0
37	DF	(Germany) GER	Janek Sternberg	3	0	0+2	0	1	0
39	MF	(Germany) GER	Lukas Fröde	3	0	0+3	0	0	0

Last updated: 20 May 2017
Source: Competitions

=== Goalscorers ===
Rank	No.	Pos	Nat	Name	Bundesliga	DFB-Pokal	Total
1	10	FW	(Germany)	Max Kruse	15	0	15
2	29	FW	(Germany)	Serge Gnabry	11	0	11
3	22	MF	(Germany)	Fin Bartels	8	0	8
4	16	MF	(Austria)	Zlatko Junuzović	4	1	5
4	23	DF	(Czech Republic)	Theodor Gebre Selassie	5	0	5
6	6	MF	(Denmark)	Thomas Delaney	4	0	4
7	7	MF	(Austria)	Florian Kainz	2	0	2
7	27	MF	(Austria)	Florian Grillitsch	2	0	2
9	2	DF	(Argentina)	Santiago García	1	0	1
9	4	DF	(Germany)	Robert Bauer	1	0	1
9	9	FW	(United States)	Aron Jóhannsson	1	0	1
9	11	FW	(Germany)	Lennart Thy	1	0	1
9	14	FW	(Peru)	Claudio Pizarro	1	0	1
9	15	MF	(Bosnia and Herzegovina)	Izet Hajrović	1	0	1
9	26	DF	(Senegal)	Lamine Sané	1	0	1
9	35	MF	(Germany)	Maximilian Eggestein	1	0	1
9	44	MF	(Germany)	Philipp Bargfrede	1	0	1
9	47	FW	(The Gambia)	Ousman Manneh	1	0	1
Own goal					0	0	0
Totals					61	1	62

Last updated: 20 May 2017

=== Clean sheets ===
Rank	No.	Pos	Nat	Name	Bundesliga	DFB-Pokal	Total
1	42	GK	(Germany)	Felix Wiedwald	5	0	5
2	33	GK	(Czech Republic)	Jaroslav Drobný	1	0	1
Totals					6	0	6

Last updated: 29 April 2017

=== Disciplinary record ===
No.	Pos	Nat	Player	Bundesliga			DFB-Pokal			Total		
No.	Pos	Nat	Player	Booked	(yellow card) (yellow-red card)	Sent off (straight red)	Booked	(yellow card) (yellow-red card)	Sent off (straight red)	Booked	(yellow card) (yellow-red card)	Sent off (straight red)
2	DF	(Argentina)	Santiago García	5	0	0	0	0	0	5	0	0
3	DF	(Italy)	Luca Caldirola	1	0	0	0	0	0	1	0	0
4	DF	(Germany)	Robert Bauer	5	0	0	0	0	0	5	0	0
6	MF	(Denmark)	Thomas Delaney	3	0	0	0	0	0	3	0	0
8	MF	(Germany)	Clemens Fritz	5	0	0	1	0	0	6	0	0
9	FW	(United States)	Aron Jóhannsson	1	0	1	0	0	0	1	0	1
10	FW	(Germany)	Max Kruse	1	0	0	0	0	0	1	0	0
13	DF	(Serbia)	Miloš Veljković	5	0	0	0	0	0	5	0	0
14	FW	(Peru)	Claudio Pizarro	1	0	0	0	0	0	1	0	0
15	MF	(Bosnia and Herzegovina)	Izet Hajrović	1	0	0	0	0	0	1	0	0
16	MF	(Austria)	Zlatko Junuzović	5	0	0	0	0	0	5	0	0
18	DF	(Finland)	Niklas Moisander	5	0	0	1	0	0	6	0	0
20	DF	(Switzerland)	Ulisses Garcia	1	0	0	0	0	0	1	0	0
22	MF	(Germany)	Fin Bartels	4	0	0	0	0	1	4	0	1
23	DF	(Czech Republic)	Theodor Gebre Selassie	4	0	0	0	0	0	4	0	0
25	MF	(Greece)	Athanasios Petsos	2	0	0	0	0	0	2	0	0
26	DF	(Senegal)	Lamine Sané	3	0	0	1	0	0	4	0	0
27	MF	(Austria)	Florian Grillitsch	4	0	0	0	0	0	4	0	0
29	FW	(Germany)	Serge Gnabry	1	0	0	0	0	0	1	0	0
33	GK	(Czech Republic)	Jaroslav Drobný	0	0	1	0	0	0	0	0	1
35	MF	(Germany)	Maximilian Eggestein	2	0	0	0	0	0	2	0	0
37	DF	(Germany)	Janek Sternberg	1	0	0	0	0	0	1	0	0
42	GK	(Germany)	Felix Wiedwald	2	0	0	0	0	0	2	0	0
44	MF	(Germany)	Philipp Bargfrede	3	0	0	0	0	0	3	0	0
47	FW	(The Gambia)	Ousman Manneh	2	0	0	0	0	0	2	0	0
Totals				67	0	2	3	0	1	70	0	3

Last updated: 20 May 2017
