= Andreas Hölzl =

Austrian footballer (born 1985)

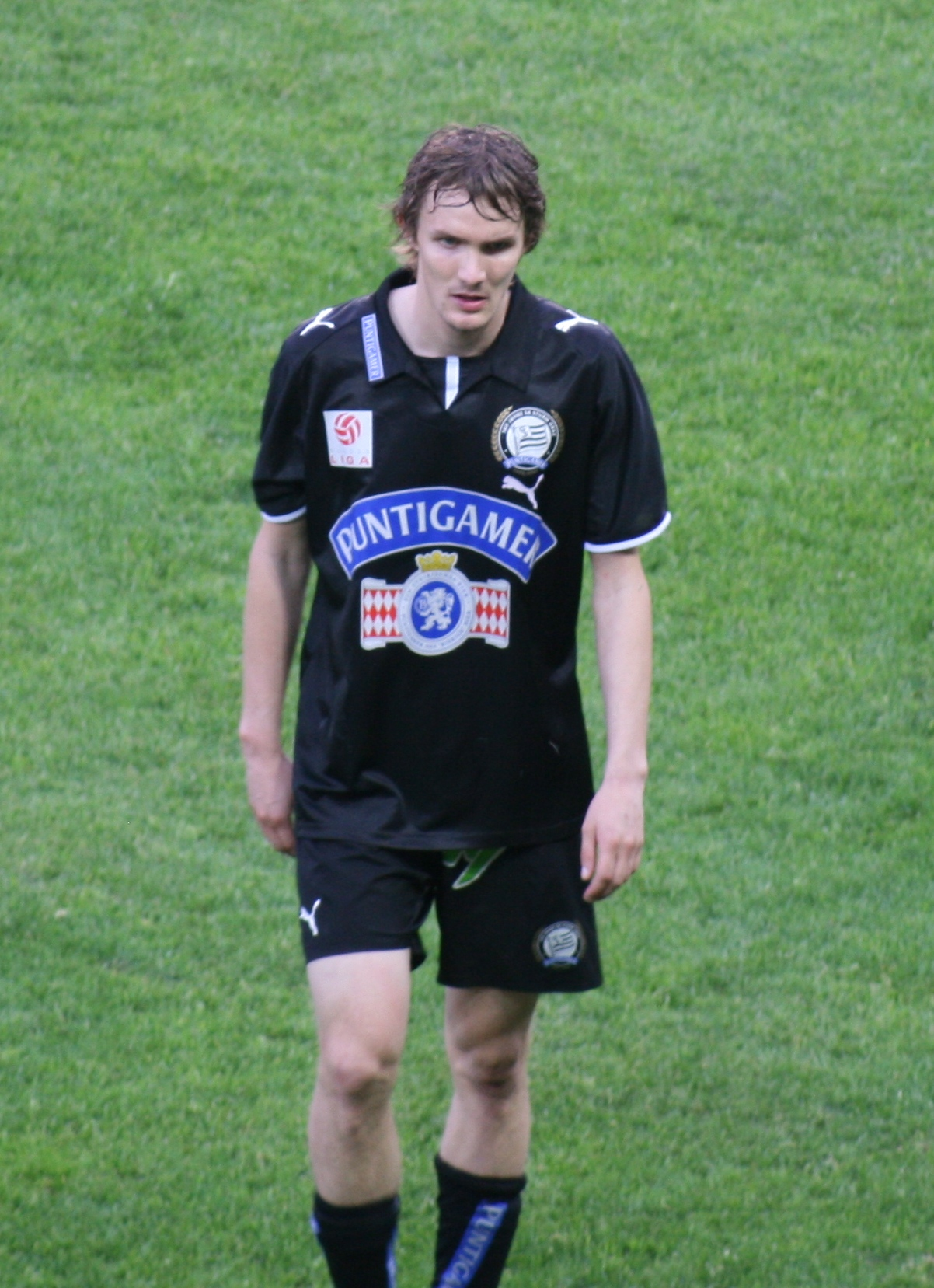

Personal information
- Full name: Andreas Hölzl
- Date of birth: 16 March 1985 (age 41)
- Place of birth: Kitzbühel, Austria
- Height: 1.76 m (5 ft 9 1/2 in)
- Position: Midfielder

Team information
- Current team: SV Brixen

Youth career
- BNZ Tirol

Senior career*
| Years | Team | Apps | (Gls) |
| 2003–2008 | Wacker Innsbruck | 120 | (12) |
| 2004 | → SV Wörgl (loan) | 13 | (1) |
| 2008–2014 | Sturm Graz | 152 | (28) |
| 2014–2017 | Wacker Innsbruck | 62 | (2) |
| 2017–2019 | FC Kitzbühel | 44 | (3) |
| 2019– | SV Brixen | | |

International career^{‡}
| | Austria U21 | 10 | (0) |
| 2008–2010 | Austria | 9 | (2) |
- * Club domestic league appearances and goals as of 1 June 2019 ‡ National team caps and goals as of 31 December 2010

Andreas Hölzl (born 16 March 1985) is an Austrian footballer who currently plays for SV Brixen in the Landesliga Ost (Tyrol).

== Club career ==
In summer 2014, Hölzl returned to Wacker Innsbruck after having spent six years with Sturm Graz. He signed for three years until 2017 and joined the club on a free transfer.
