= 2010–11 Austrian Football First League =

Austrian Football First League
- Season: 2010–11
- Promoted: FC Trenkwalder Admira
- Relegated: FC Gratkorn
- Matches: 180
- Goals: 567 (3.15 per match)

The 2010-11 Austrian Football First League (German: Erste Liga, also known as ADEG Erste Liga due to sponsorship) was the 37th season of the Austrian second-level football league. It began on 14 July 2010 and ended on 28 May 2011.

The size of the league was reduced from twelve to ten teams for this season after a reform of the second- and third-level tiers of the Austrian football league pyramid. Reserve teams from Bundesliga clubs were excluded from competing in the First League, and relegation/promotion playoffs between the ninth-placed First League team and the two Regionalliga champions missing out on direct promotion were introduced.

== Teams ==
Wacker Innsbruck as 2009–10 First League champions were promoted to the 2010–11 Bundesliga. Wacker were originally to be replaced by SK Austria Kärnten, who finished the 2009–10 Bundesliga season in last place; however, Kärnten were not awarded a professional licence by the Bundesliga licensing board and hence relegated to the Austrian Regionalliga.

As part of the reform of the Austrian second and third levels, the reserve teams of Bundesliga clubs Red Bull Salzburg and Austria Vienna were both relegated to the Regionaliga at the end of the 2009–10 season. They were joined by Dornbirn 1913, who finished the 2009–10 season in last place of the league table and hence were relegated as well.

Due to the decreased size of the league, only two teams from the Regionalliga were promoted. WAC St. Andrä as winners of the promotion playoff between the three Regionalliga champions were directly promoted, while SV Grödig were scheduled to play in another playoff against 9th-placed First League team First Vienna FC. The playoff was then cancelled and Grödig directly admitted to the First League after Austria Kärnten were denied their professional licence.

Club Name	Stadium	Capacity
Austria Lustenau	Reichshofstadion	12,500
FC Gratkorn	Sportstadion Gratkorn	3,000
FC Lustenau	Reichshofstadion	12,500
FC Trenkwalder Admira	Bundesstadion Südstadt	12,000
First Vienna FC	Hohe Warte Stadium	5,000
SC Rheindorf Altach	Stadion Schnabelholz	8,900
SKN St. Pölten	Voith-Platz	10,000
SV Grödig	Untersburg Arena	1,500
TSV Hartberg	Stadion Hartberg	6,000
WAC St. Andrä	Sportstadion Wolfsberg	8,000

== League table ==
Pos	Team	Pld	W	D	L	GF	GA	GD	Pts	Promotion or relegation
1	FC Trenkwalder Admira (C)	36	23	6	7	85	45	+40	75	Promotion to 2011–12 Austrian Bundesliga
2	SC Rheindorf Altach	36	22	8	6	76	37	+39	74	
3	Austria Lustenau	36	16	6	14	55	51	+4	54	
4	WAC St. Andrä	36	15	7	14	56	50	+6	52	
5	SKN St. Pölten	36	13	12	11	55	55	0	51	
6	SV Grödig	36	12	10	14	51	60	−9	46	
7	FC Lustenau	36	11	9	16	51	60	−9	42	
8	TSV Hartberg	36	10	9	17	44	60	−16	39	
9	First Vienna FC (O)	36	9	7	20	47	67	−20	34	Qualification to Relegation playoffs
10	FC Gratkorn (R)	36	9	6	21	47	82	−35	33	Relegation to 2011–12 Austrian Regionalliga

Source: soccerway.com
Rules for classification: 1) points; 2) goal difference; 3) number of goals scored.
(C) Champions; (O) Play-off winners; (R) Relegated

== See also ==
- 2010–11 Austrian Football Bundesliga
- 2010–11 Austrian Cup
