= Marvin Weinberger =

Austrian footballer

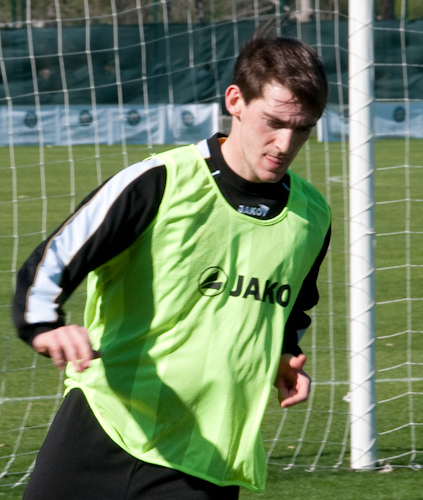

Personal information
- Date of birth: 4 April 1989 (age 37)
- Place of birth: Austria
- Height: 1.76 m (5 ft 9 1/2 in)
- Position: Striker

Team information
- Current team: SC Kalsdorf
- Number: 2

Youth career
- 1995–2002: Sportunion Laßnitzhöhe

Senior career*
Years	Team	Apps	(Gls)
2008–2012	Sturm Graz	14	(2)
2012–2013	Kapfenberger SV	12	(0)
2013–	SC Kalsdorf	3	(0)
- * Club domestic league appearances and goals as of 25 March 2013

Marvin Weinberger (born 4 April 1989) in Laßnitzhöhe is an Austrian football striker for SC Kalsdorf.
