= Tomasz Wełnicki =

Polish footballer

Personal information
- Full name: Tomasz Wełnicki
- Date of birth: 18 April 1990 (age 36)
- Place of birth: Olsztyn, Poland
- Height: 1.85 m (6 ft 1 in)
- Position: Centre-back

Youth career
- Warmia Olsztyn
- VfL Bochum

Senior career*
| Years | Team | Apps | (Gls) |
| 2009–2011 | 1. FC Nuremberg II | 33 | (1) |
| 2011–2013 | Kapfenberger SV | 24 | (0) |
| 2013–2014 | Górnik Zabrze | 6 | (0) |
| 2013–2014 | Górnik Zabrze II | 10 | (0) |
| 2014–2015 | Stomil Olsztyn | 8 | (1) |
| 2015–2016 | Zawisza Bydgoszcz | 11 | (0) |
| 2016–2017 | Stomil Olsztyn | 23 | (0) |
| 2017–2018 | Legia Warsaw II | 14 | (1) |
| 2018–2019 | Stomil Olsztyn | 27 | (0) |
| 2019 | Siarka Tarnobrzeg | 12 | (0) |
| 2023 | Strefa Aut Olsztyn | 0 | (0) |

International career
| | Poland U19 | 3 | (0) |
| 2010 | Poland U20 | 1 | (0) |
- * Club domestic league appearances and goals as of 18 March 2024

Tomasz Wełnicki (born 18 March 1990) is a Polish footballer who plays as a centre-back.
