= Philipp Wendler =

Austrian footballer

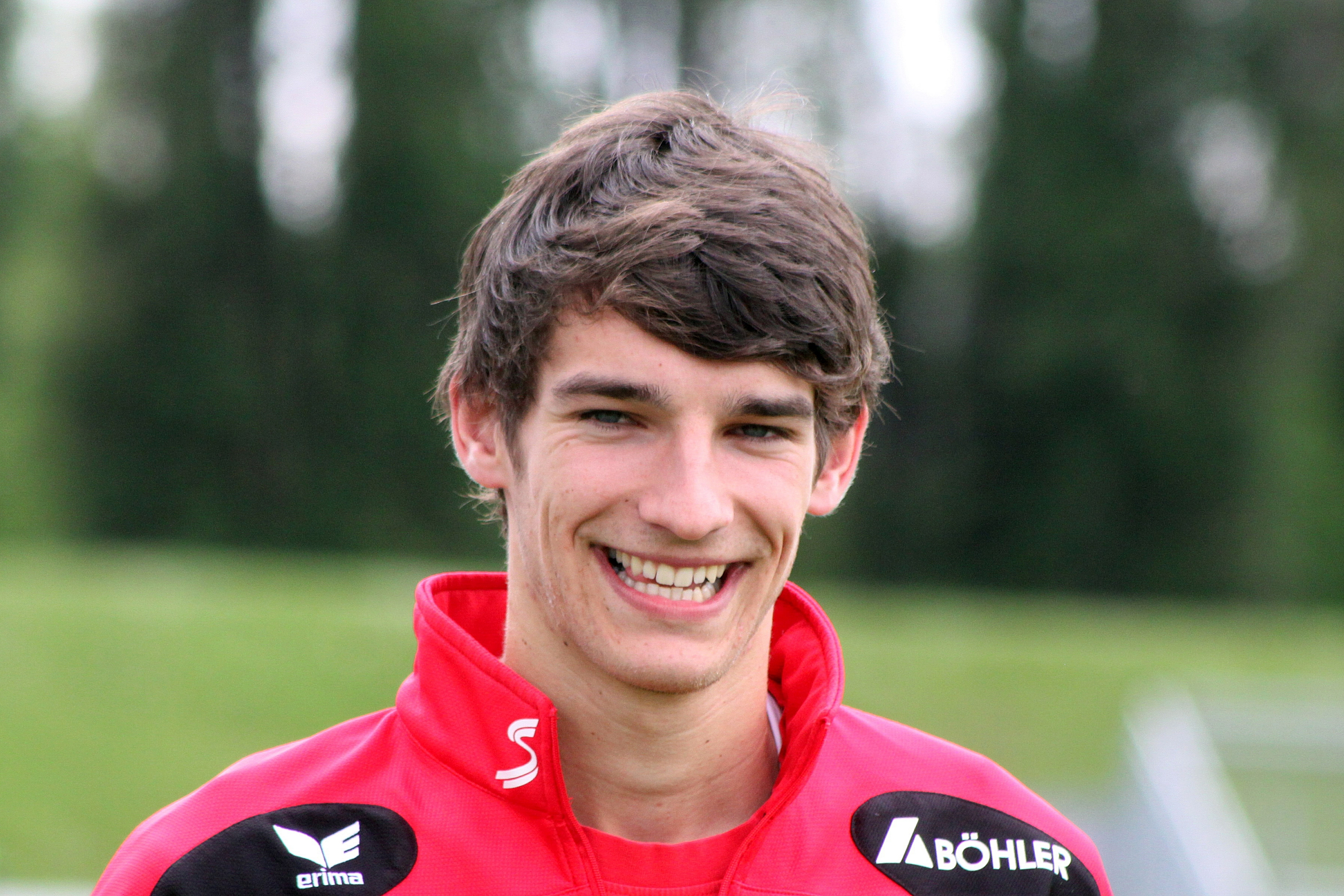

Personal information
- Full name: Philipp Wendler
- Date of birth: 2 June 1991 (age 35)
- Place of birth: Feldbach, Austria
- Height: 1.92 m (6 ft 3 1/2 in)
- Position: Forward

Team information
- Current team: SV Lafnitz
- Number: 11

Senior career*
Years	Team	Apps	(Gls)
2009–2016	Kapfenberger SV	97	(22)
2016–2019	TuS Bad Gleichenberg		
2019–2020	Grazer AK	8	(1)
2020–	SV Lafnitz	9	(2)
- * Club domestic league appearances and goals as of 4 January 2021

Philipp Wendler (born 2 June 1991) is an Austrian footballer who plays for SV Lafnitz.
