= 2009–10 Austrian Football First League =

Austrian Football First League
- Season: 2009–10
- Promoted: FC Wacker Innsbruck
- Relegated: Red Bull Salzburg Reserves; Austria Vienna Reserves; FC Dornbirn 1913
- Matches: 198
- Goals: 578 (2.92 per match)

The 2009–10 Austrian Football First League (German: Erste Liga, also known as ADEG Erste Liga due to sponsorship) was the 36th season of the Austrian second-level football league. It began on 14 July 2009 and ended on 28 May 2010.

The season is the last one played with twelve teams, as league size will be reduced to ten for 2010–11. The reserve teams of Austrian Bundesliga clubs Red Bull Salzburg and Austria Vienna will be demoted to the Regionalliga after the season regardless of their final position. The last-placed of the remaining ten teams will also be relegated, while the team ranked ninth will compete with the Regionalliga champions for another spot in the 2010–11 season.

== Team movements ==
=== Movement between Bundesliga and Erste Liga ===
SC Wiener Neustadt as 2008–09 champions were promoted to the Bundesliga. They were replaced by SC Rheindorf Altach, who finished the 2008–09 Bundesliga season in last place.

=== Movement between Erste Liga and Regionalliga ===
SV Grödig, DSV Leoben and 1. FC Vöcklabruck finished the 2008–09 season in the bottom three places and were relegated to their appropriate Regionalliga division. The three relegated teams were replaced by Regionalliga division champions First Vienna (East), TSV Hartberg (Central) and FC Dornbirn 1913 (West).

== Team overview ==
Club Name	Stadium	Capacity
Austria Lustenau	Reichshofstadion	12,500
Austria Vienna Reserves	Franz Horr Stadium	11,800
FC Dornbirn 1913	Stadion Birkenwiese	12,000
FC Gratkorn	Sportstadion Gratkorn	3,000
FC Lustenau	Reichshofstadion	12,500
Red Bull Salzburg Reserves	Red Bull Arena	31,000
FC Trenkwalder Admira	Bundesstadion Südstadt	12,000
FC Wacker Innsbruck	Tivoli Neu	30,000
First Vienna FC	Hohe Warte Stadium	5,000
SC Rheindorf Altach	Stadion Schnabelholz	8,900
SKN St. Pölten	Voith-Platz	10,000
TSV Hartberg	Stadion Hartberg	6,000

== League table ==
Pos	Team	Pld	W	D	L	GF	GA	GD	Pts	Promotion or relegation
1	FC Wacker Innsbruck (C, P)	33	21	6	6	67	26	+41	69	Promotion to 2010–11 Austrian Bundesliga
2	FC Trenkwalder Admira	33	20	7	6	68	22	+46	67	
3	SC Rheindorf Altach	33	20	6	7	60	27	+33	66	
4	SKN St. Pölten	33	14	9	10	44	42	+2	51	
5	Austria Lustenau	33	15	5	13	43	46	−3	50	
6	Red Bull Salzburg Reserves (R)	33	13	5	15	58	49	+9	44	Relegation to 2010–11 Austrian Regionalliga (Note: Red Bull Salzburg Reserves and Austria Vienna Reserves will be relegated to the Regionalliga at the end of the season regardless of their final position.)
7	FC Gratkorn	33	11	10	12	57	51	+6	43	
8	FC Lustenau	33	12	5	16	42	52	−10	41	
9	TSV Hartberg	33	11	5	17	36	68	−32	38	
10	Austria Vienna Reserves (R)	33	9	8	16	42	57	−15	35	Relegation to 2010–11 Austrian Regionalliga
11	First Vienna FC	33	8	6	19	37	57	−20	30	Qualification to Relegation playoffs (Note: Since Austria Kärnten did not obtain First League license and were therefore relegated from Bundesliga to Regionalliga, promotion/relegation play-offs between First Vienna and SV Grödig were cancelled with both teams obtaining a spot in the 2010–11 Austrian Football First League.)
12	FC Dornbirn 1913 (R)	33	6	4	23	24	81	−57	22	Relegation to 2010–11 Austrian Regionalliga

Source: bundesliga.at
Rules for classification: 1) points; 2) goal difference; 3) number of goals scored.
(C) Champions; (P) Promoted; (R) Relegated

== Season statistics ==
=== Top scorers ===
Rank	Player	Club	Goals
1	(Austria) Tomas Miranda	Rheindorf Altach	11
1	(Turkey) Osman Bozkurt	First Vienna	11
1	(Austria) Marcel Schreter	Wacker Innsbruck	11
4	(Serbia) Djordje Rakic	Red Bull Salzburg Reserves	10
5	(Austria) Andreas Dammer	Rheindorf Altach	8
5	(Brazil) Fabiano	Wacker Innsbruck	8
7	(Austria) Julius Perstaller	Wacker Innsbruck	7
7	(Austria) Patrick Bürger	Hartberg	7
9	(Austria) Joahachim Parapatis	Gratkorn	6
9	(Austria) Patrick Salomon	Austria Lustenau	6
9	(Austria) Thomas Stadler	Dornbirn	6

Source: Weltfussball.de Updated: 26 February 2010
