= Zlatko Junuzović =

Austrian footballer (born 1987)

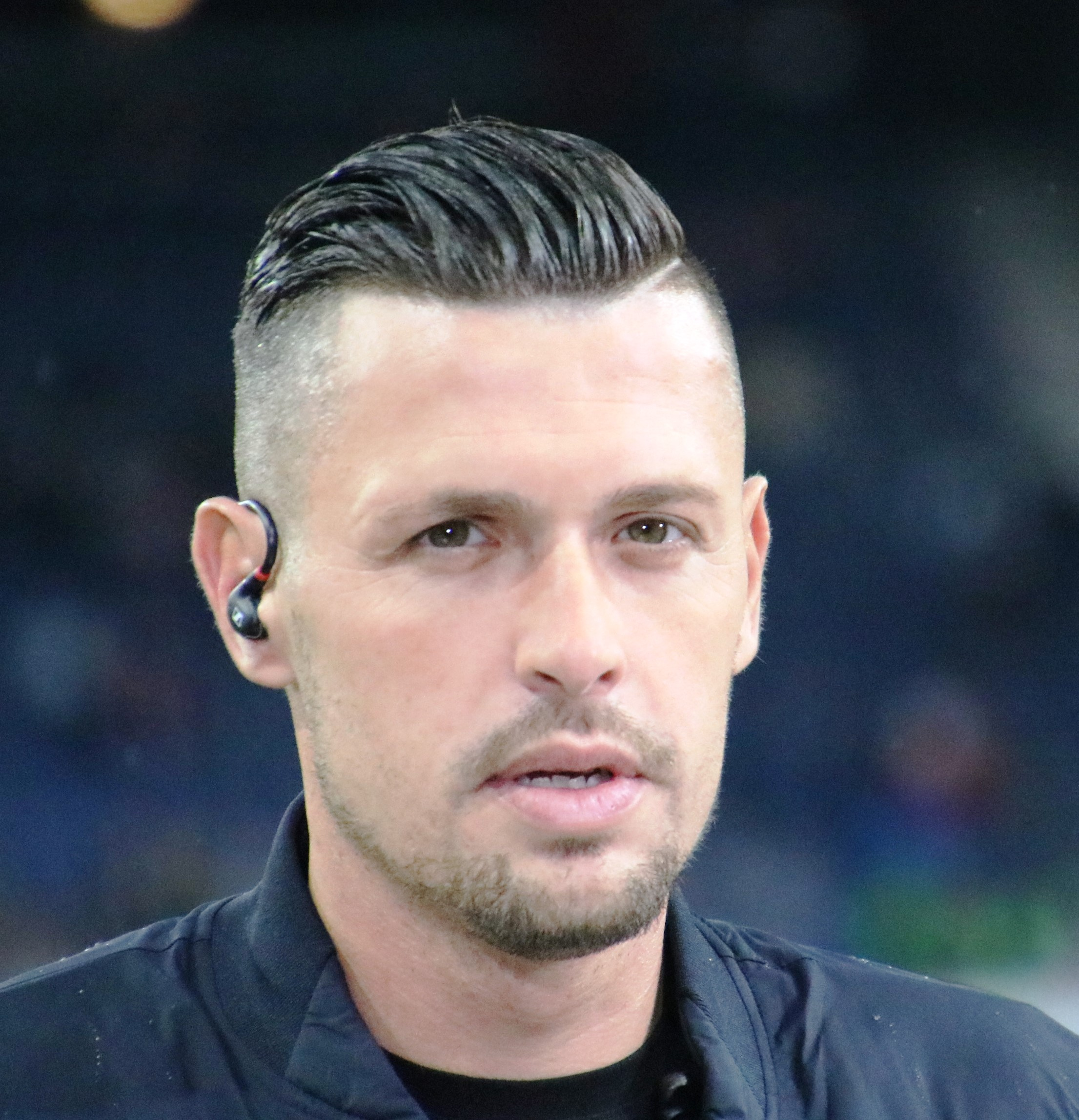
- Junuzović in 2023

Personal information
- Full name: Zlatko Junuzović
- Date of birth: 26 September 1987 (age 39)
- Place of birth: Loznica, SR Serbia, SFR Yugoslavia
- Height: 1.72 m (5 ft 8 in)
- Position: Midfielder

Youth career
- 1994–1999: Kühnsdorf
- 1999–2005: Grazer AK

Senior career*
Years	Team	Apps	(Gls)
2005–2007	Grazer AK	70	(9)
2007–2009	Austria Kärnten	57	(3)
2009–2012	Austria Wien	82	(21)
2012–2018	Werder Bremen	188	(21)
2018–2022	Red Bull Salzburg	81	(9)
Total		478	(63)

International career
	Austria U19	2	(1)
2007	Austria U20	11	(4)
2005–2008	Austria U21	15	(3)
2006–2017	Austria	55	(7)

Managerial career
- 2022–: FC Liefering (assistant)
- * Club domestic league appearances and goals

Zlatko Junuzović (Serbian Cyrillic: Златко Јунузовић, German pronunciation: [ˈzlatko juˈnuːzɔvɪtʃ]; born 26 September 1987) is an Austrian former professional footballer who played as a midfielder. From 2006 to 2017 he played for the Austria national team. He was known as a free-kick specialist.

== Early life ==
Junuzović moved with his parents to Austria when he was five years old. Before his 12th birthday, they went on to Graz, where he soon played for the youth teams of Grazer AK.

== Club career ==
Aged 17, Junuzović made his debut for Grazer AK in the Austrian Bundesliga in spring 2005. In 2006, he was called up to play for the Austria national team and became a regular starter for Grazer AK. In summer 2007, Junuzović moved to Austria Kärnten before joining Austria Wien in summer 2009.

In 2010, Junuzović was awarded two awards for his performances with Austria Wien and the national team: the managers of the Austrian Bundesliga voted him Austrian Footballer of the Year and the country's supporters voted him "Player of the Year" in the annual award awarded by the Kronen Zeitung.

In January 2012, Junuzović joined Bundesliga club Werder Bremen, signing a contract which lasted until 30 June 2015. In February 2015, it was announced that his contract had been extended until June 2018.

Having completed the 2014–15 season with six goals and 15 assists, third in the Bundesliga behind Kevin De Bruyne and Thomas Müller, Junuzović was voted as "Player of the Season" by Werder's fans.

On 18 March 2017, he scored his second goal of the 2016–17 season in a 3–0 win against Leipzig, a match that saw all three of Werder Bremen's Austrian players score in the club's highest win of the season.

In April 2018, Junuzović announced he would leave Werder Bremen after six and half years at the club. He went to FC Red Bull Salzburg in the Austrian Bundesliga. In 2022, he ended his career and became assistant coach of FC Liefering.

== International career ==
Junuzović played for the Austria U20 national team at the 2007 FIFA U-20 World Cup where they claimed fourth place. He made his debut for the senior team in a March 2006 friendly match against Canada.

He represented the Austria senior national team at the UEFA Euro 2016.

In October 2017, after the conclusion of the qualifiers for the 2018 World Cup during which Austria failed to reach qualification, Junuzović announced his retirement from the national team.

== Personal life ==
Junuzović was born in the Serbian town of Loznica to a Bosnian Muslim family.

== Career statistics ==
=== Club ===
Appearances and goals by club, season and competition
Club	Season	League			Cup (Note: Includes Austrian Cup and the DFB-Pokal)		Europe (Note: Includes UEFA Champions League and UEFA Europa League)		Total	
Club	Season	Division	Apps	Goals	Apps	Goals	Apps	Goals	Apps	Goals
Grazer AK	2004–05	Austrian Bundesliga	4	0	—		—		4	0
Grazer AK	2005–06	Austrian Bundesliga	32	4	1	0	4	1	38	5
Grazer AK	2006–07	Austrian Bundesliga	34	5	3	0	—		37	5
Grazer AK	Total		70	9	4	0	4	1	78	10
Austria Kärnten	2007–08	Austrian Bundesliga	28	2	—		—		28	2
Austria Kärnten	2008–09	Austrian Bundesliga	29	1	1	1	—		30	2
Austria Kärnten	Total		57	3	1	1	0	0	58	4
Austria Wien	2009–10	Austrian Bundesliga	30	6	2	1	8	0	40	7
Austria Wien	2010–11	Austrian Bundesliga	33	9	3	1	3	1	39	11
Austria Wien	2011–12	Austrian Bundesliga	19	6	2	1	12	0	33	7
Austria Wien	Total		82	21	7	3	23	1	112	25
Werder Bremen	2011–12	Bundesliga	15	0	—		—		15	0
Werder Bremen	2012–13	Bundesliga	30	3	1	0	—		31	3
Werder Bremen	2013–14	Bundesliga	26	2	1	0	—		27	2
Werder Bremen	2014–15	Bundesliga	33	6	2	0	—		35	6
Werder Bremen	2015–16	Bundesliga	30	4	3	0	—		33	4
Werder Bremen	2016–17	Bundesliga	30	4	1	1	—		31	5
Werder Bremen	2017–18	Bundesliga	24	2	2	0	—		26	2
Werder Bremen	Total		188	21	10	1	0	0	198	22
Red Bull Salzburg	2018–19	Austrian Bundesliga	21	4	4	1	10	1	35	6
Red Bull Salzburg	2019–20	Austrian Bundesliga	23	3	4	1	7	0	34	4
Red Bull Salzburg	2020–21	Austrian Bundesliga	25	1	5	0	9	1	39	2
Red Bull Salzburg	2021–22	Austrian Bundesliga	12	1	2	0	1	0	15	1
Red Bull Salzburg	Total		81	9	15	2	27	2	123	13
Career total			478	63	37	7	54	4	570	74

=== International ===
Scores and results list Austria's goal tally first, score column indicates score after each Junuzović goal.

List of international goals scored by Zlatko Junuzović
No.	Date	Venue	Opponent	Score	Result	Competition
1	7 October 2011	Dalga Arena, Baku, Azerbaijan	Azerbaijan	4–1	4–1	UEFA Euro 2012 qualifying
2	1 June 2012	Tivoli-Neu, Innsbruck, Austria	Ukraine	1–0	3–2	Friendly
3	11 September 2012	Ernst-Happel-Stadion, Vienna, Austria	Germany	1–2	1–2	2014 FIFA World Cup qualification
4	22 March 2013	Ernst-Happel-Stadion, Vienna, Austria	Faroe Islands	4–0	6–0	2014 FIFA World Cup qualification
5	27 March 2015	Rheinpark Stadion, Vaduz, Liechtenstein	Liechtenstein	4–0	5–0	UEFA Euro 2016 qualifying
6	5 September 2015	Ernst-Happel-Stadion, Vienna, Austria	Moldova	1–0	1–0	UEFA Euro 2016 qualifying
7	29 March 2016	Ernst-Happel-Stadion, Vienna, Austria	Turkey	1–0	1–2	Friendly

== Honours ==
Red Bull Salzburg

- Austrian Football Bundesliga: 2018–19, 2019–20, 2020–21, 2021–22
- Austrian Cup: 2018–19, 2019–20, 2020–21, 2021–22

Individual

- Austrian Footballer of the Year: 2010
- Werder Bremen Supporters' Player of the Season: 2014–15
