= Marcel Schreter =

Austrian footballer

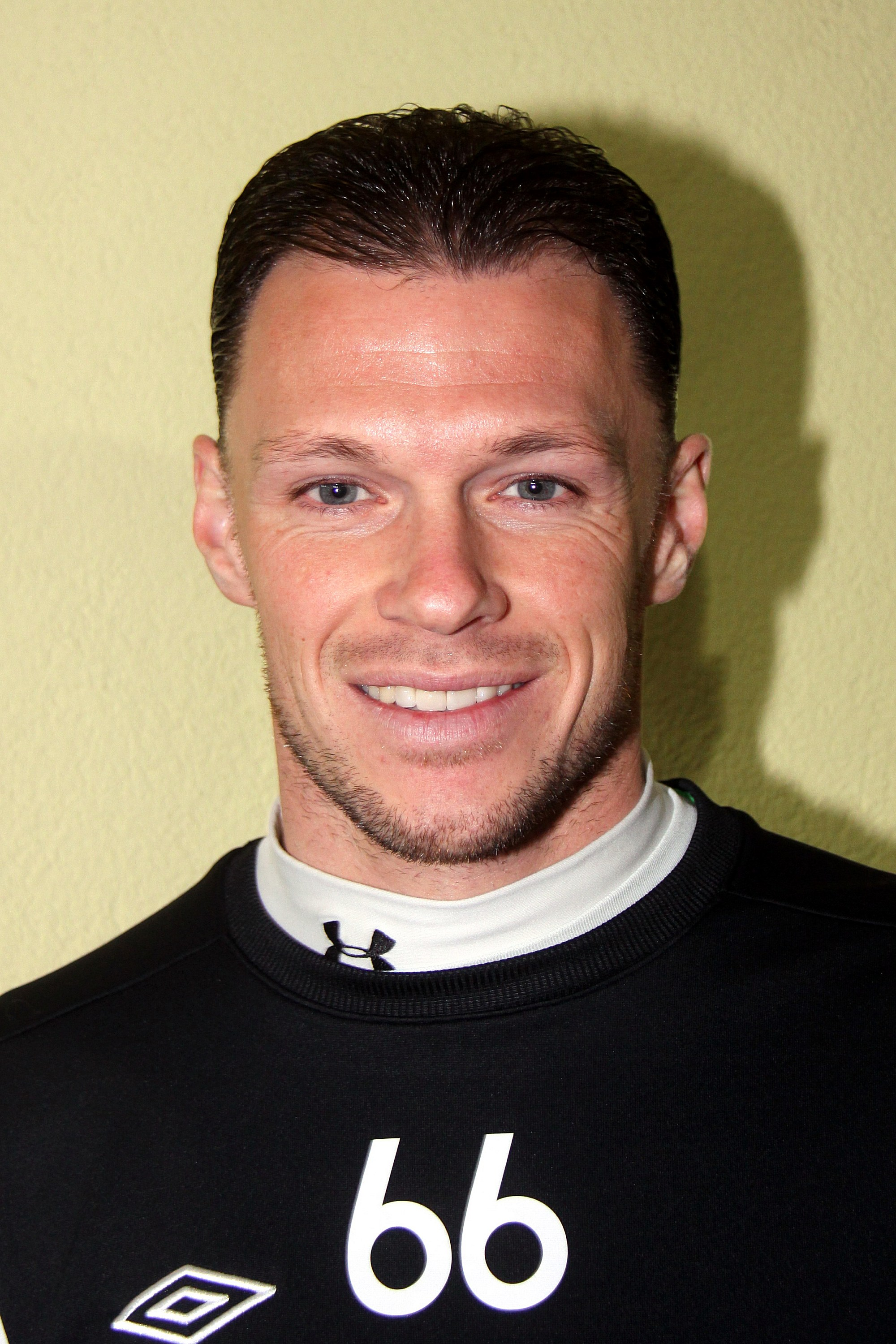

Personal information
- Full name: Marcel Schreter
- Date of birth: 29 September 1981 (age 45)
- Place of birth: Innsbruck, Austria
- Height: 1.79 m (5 ft 10 1/2 in)
- Position: Midfielder

Team information
- Current team: SV Telfs

Youth career
- 1988–1998: SV Telfs

Senior career*
Years	Team	Apps	(Gls)
2002–2003	WSG Wattens	27	(5)
2003–2013	Wacker Innsbruck	242	(51)
2013–2015	Austria Lustenau	60	(10)
2015–2016	WSG Wattens	26	(8)
2016–	SV Telfs		
- * Club domestic league appearances and goals as of 28 June 2016

Marcel Schreter (born 29 September 1981) is an Austrian footballer who plays for SV Telfs in the Tiroler Liga.
