= Josip Topić =

Bosnian-Herzegovinian footballer

Personal information
- Date of birth: October 22, 1982 (age 44)
- Place of birth: Bugojno, SFR Yugoslavia
- Height: 1.87 m (6 ft 2 in)
- Position: Defender

Youth career
- 2000–2001: HNK Hajduk

Senior career*
Years	Team	Apps	(Gls)
2001–2002	Solin	26	(2)
2002–2006	Posušje	142	(9)
2006–2011	Široki Brijeg	166	(14)
2012	NK Imotski		
2013–2014	SC Schwanenstadt	33	(1)
2015–2016	Union Thalheim	31	(3)
2016–2017	SK Rot-Weiß Lambach	12	(0)
2017–2018	SV Wallern II	8	(1)

International career
2001	Croatia U-19	7	(0)
2003	Bosnia and Herzegovina U-21	8	(0)
- * Club domestic league appearances and goals as of 1 February 2016

Josip Topić (born October 22, 1982, in Bugojno) is a Bosnian-Herzegovinian retired footballer.

He played the last years of his career in the Austrian lower leagues.
