= Srđan Pavlov =

Serbian footballer

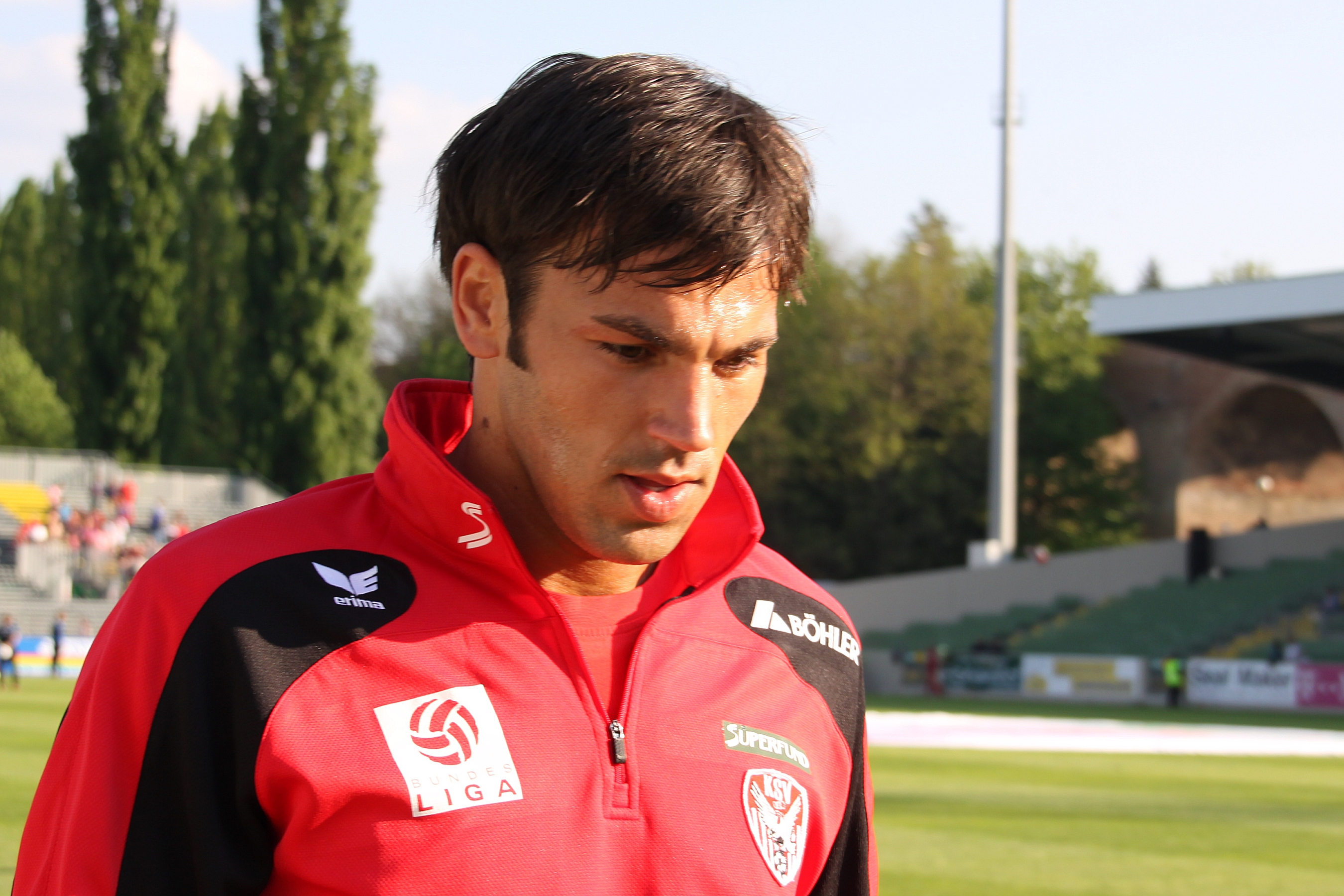
- Pavlov in 2009

Personal information
- Date of birth: 28 January 1984 (age 42)
- Place of birth: Kostolac, SFR Yugoslavia
- Height: 1.94 m (6 ft 4 in)
- Position: Striker

Youth career
- Rudar Kostolac

Senior career*
Years	Team	Apps	(Gls)
2002–2006	Rudar Kostolac	52	(25)
2006–2008	Köflach	11	(4)
2008	Leoben	19	(5)
2009–2011	Kapfenberg	43	(11)
2012	Sturm Graz	3	(0)
2012	Blau-Weiß Linz	10	(2)
2013	Sloga Petrovac		
2013–2014	Rudar Kostolac		
2015	St. Stefan im Rosental	3	(2)
2016	Karabakh Wien	13	(15)
2016–2017	Hellas-Kagran	30	(30)
2017–2018	Kirchschlag	13	(11)
2018	Rudar Kostolac		
2019–2021	ATSV Hollabrunn	39	(44)
2022–2024	Rudar Kostolac		
- * Club domestic league appearances and goals as of 21:13, 7 March 2023 (UTC)

Srđan Pavlov (Serbian Cyrillic: Cpђaн Пaвлoв; also transliterated as Srdjan, born 28 January 1984) is a Serbian retired footballer.

In 2012, he was traded to the Austrian Football Bundesliga team SK Sturm Graz. Later that year he moved to Blau-Weiß Linz; that contract was terminated in November. He plays as a striker.
