= Tiroler Liga =

- Country: Austria
- Confederation: Tirol Football Association
- Number of clubs: 16
- Level on pyramid: 5
- Promotion to: Regionalliga Tirol
- Relegation to: Landesliga West or Landesliga Ost
- Domestic cup: Tiroler Cup
- Current champions: FC Wacker Innsbruck (2024–25)
- Website: tfv.at
- Current: 2025–26 Tiroler Liga

The Tiroler Liga (officially the HYPO TIROL Liga) is the highest division within Tyrol and the fifth tier of the Austrian football league system. It is organised by the Tirol Football Association. Since the reinstatement of the Regionalliga West as the third tier in 2023–24, the Regionalliga Tirol has operated at the fourth tier; the Tiroler Liga therefore feeds into the Regionalliga Tirol. In a typical season the top two clubs are promoted, while three clubs are relegated to the Landesliga Ost or Landesliga West.

== 2025–26 member clubs ==
- SV Absam
- FC Stubai
- SV Kirchbichl
- SV Haiming
- SV Hall
- SC Münster
- SV Längenfeld
- SV Kolsass/Weer
- SV Götzens
- FC Natters
- SVG Mayrhofen
- SPG Oberland West
- SV Schlitters
- SV Umhausen
- SV Brixen
