= Felix Roth =

German footballer

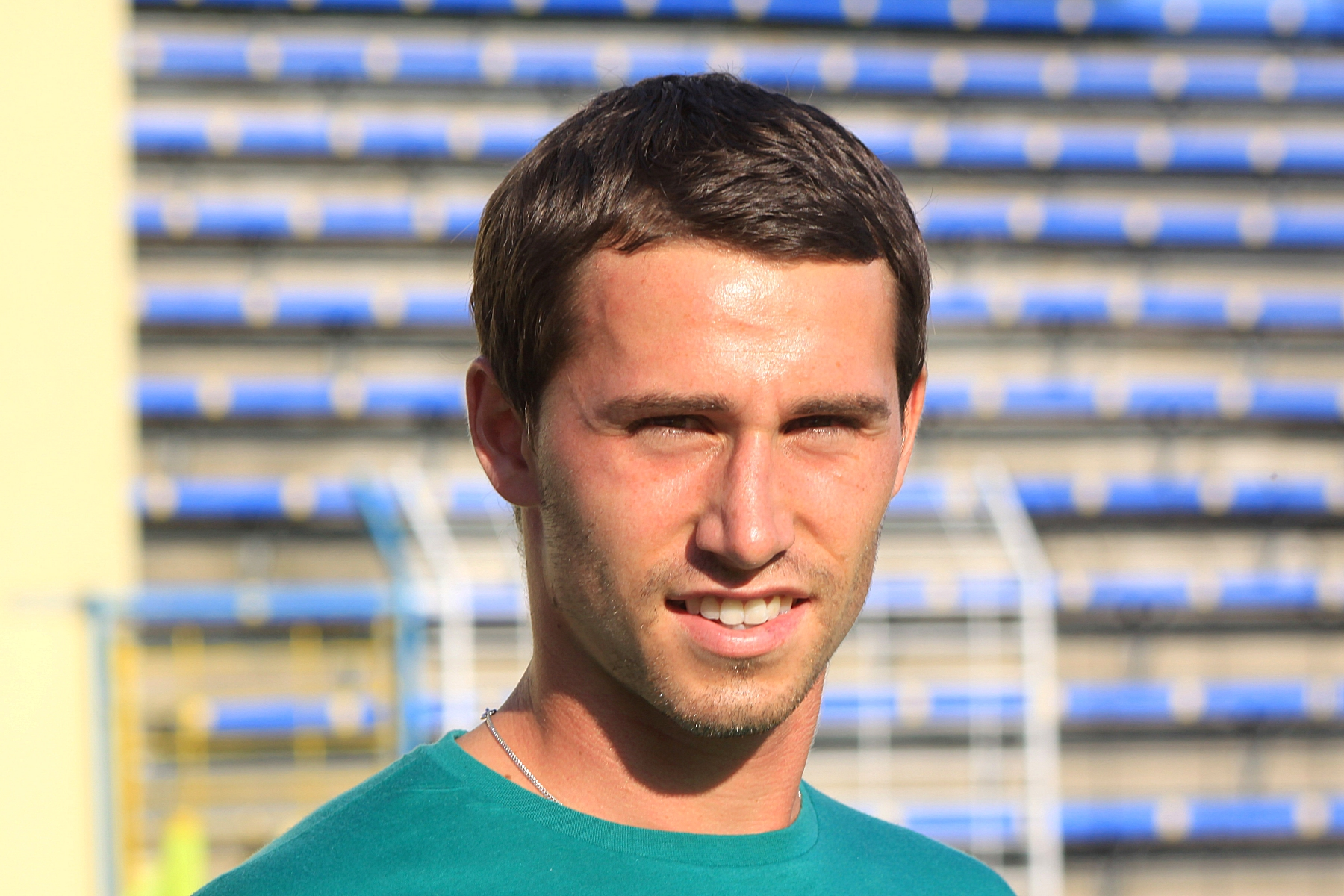
- Roth with Austria Lustenau in 2010

Personal information
- Date of birth: 13 November 1987 (age 39)
- Place of birth: Offenburg, West Germany
- Height: 1.79 m (5 ft 10 in)
- Position: Attacking midfielder

Youth career
- TuS Durbach
- –2002: Offenburger FV
- 2002–2006: SC Freiburg

Senior career*
Years	Team	Apps	(Gls)
2006–2010	SC Freiburg II	83	(36)
2008–2010	SC Freiburg	1	(0)
2010–2013	Austria Lustenau	77	(20)
2013–2016	SCR Altach	77	(12)
2016–2021	SC Freiburg II	68	(5)
Total		306	(73)
- * Club domestic league appearances and goals

Felix Roth (born 13 November 1987) is a German former professional footballer who played as an attacking midfielder. He retired at the end of the 2020–21 season.
