= Markus Hammerer =

Austrian footballer

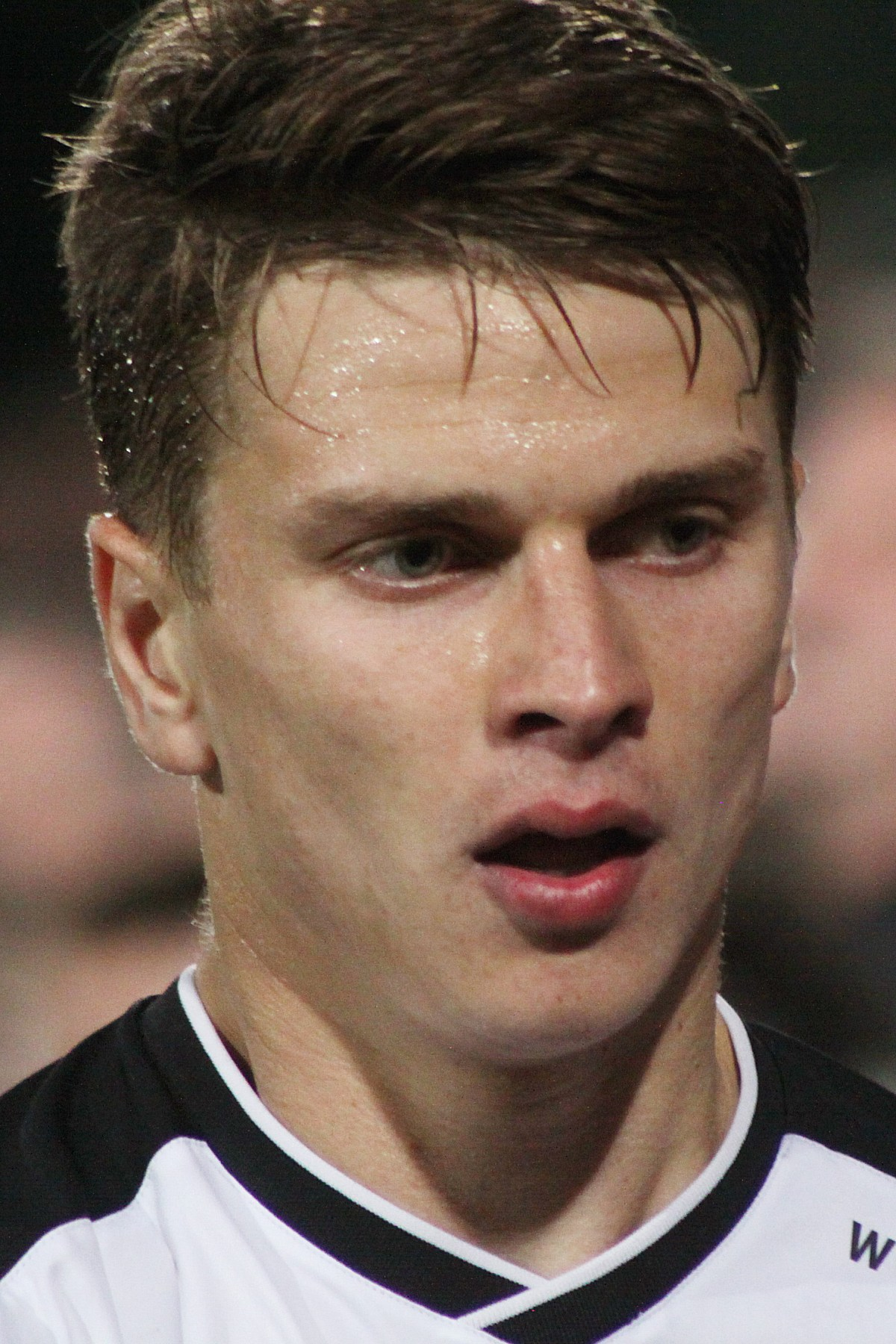

Personal information
- Date of birth: 31 August 1989 (age 37)
- Place of birth: Braunau am Inn, Austria
- Height: 1.78 m (5 ft 10 in)
- Position: Forward

Senior career*
Years	Team	Apps	(Gls)
2006–2008	FC Braunau		
2008–2009	SK Altheim	26	(15)
2009–2013	SV Ried	68	(8)
2013–2015	LASK Linz	16	(7)
2015–2016	LASK Linz Juniors	7	(3)
- * Club domestic league appearances and goals as of 14:16, 12 December 2018 (UTC)

Markus Hammerer (born 31 August 1989) is an Austrian footballer.
