= Landesliga Ost (Tyrol) =

- Country: Austria
- Confederation: Austrian Football Association
- Number of clubs: 14
- Level on pyramid: 5
- Promotion to: Tiroler Liga
- Relegation to: Gebietsliga Ost
- Current champions: SV Brixen (2022-23)

The Landesliga Ost is together with the Landesliga West, the second-highest division of Tyrol and the fifth-highest division in Austrian football. The champions advance into the Tiroler Liga. In the 2015/16 season, SK Ebbs was able to secure the championship.

== 2023–24 member clubs ==
- SV Absam
- SV Angerberg
- FC Bruckhäusl
- SK Jenbach
- SV Kirchdorf
- FC Kramsach/Brandenberg
- FC Kufstein II
- SV Raika Kolsass/Weer
- FC Schwoich
- FC Söll
- SVG Stumm
- SV Thiersee
- SV Walchsee
- SV Westendorf
Location of teams in 2023–24 Landesliga Ost (Tyrol)
