= 1988–89 FC St. Pauli season =

FC St. Pauli
1988–89 season
- Manager: Helmut Schulte
- Stadium: Wilhelm-Koch-Stadion
- Bundesliga: 10th
- DFB-Pokal: First round
- Top goalscorer: League: André Golke (9); All: André Golke (9)
- Highest home attendance: 53,950 (vs Hamburger SV, 23 March 1989) (Note: Match played at Volksparkstadion)
- Lowest home attendance: 15,100 (vs Hannover 96, 13 May 1989)
Home colours	Away colours

The 1988–89 season was the 76th season in the history of FC St. Pauli. They competed in the Bundesliga, the top tier of German football, and the DFB-Pokal. It was the club's second season in the Bundesliga and first following their promotion from the 2. Bundesliga in the 1987–88 season.

== Competitions ==
=== Bundesliga ===
==== League table ====
Pos	Team	Pld	W	D	L	GF	GA	GD	Pts
8	Bayer Leverkusen	34	10	14	10	45	44	+1	34
9	1. FC Kaiserslautern	34	10	13	11	47	44	+3	33
10	FC St. Pauli	34	9	14	11	41	42	−1	32
11	Karlsruher SC	34	12	8	14	48	51	−3	32
12	Waldhof Mannheim	34	10	11	13	43	52	−9	31

Source: www.dfb.de
Rules for classification: 1) points; 2) goal difference; 3) number of goals scored.

==== Matches ====
Win	Draw	Loss

Bundesliga match results
Match	Date	Time	Opponent	Venue	Result F–A	Scorers	Attendance	Ref.
1	23 July 1988	15:30	1. FC Nürnberg	Home	0–1	—	18,500	
2	30 July 1988	15:30	VfL Bochum	Away	0–0	—	12,000	
3	13 August 1988	15:30	Eintracht Frankfurt	Home	2–0	Flad 63' (pen.), Kocian 70'	19,000	
4	19 August 1988	20:00	Karlsruher SC	Away	1–3	Steubing 53'	25,000	
5	26 August 1988	18:15	VfB Stuttgart	Home	2–1	Golke 65', Gronau 86'	20,000	
6	3 September 1988	15:30	Hamburger SV	Away	1–1	Kocian 85'	48,000	
7	9 September 1988	17:45	1. FC Kaiserslautern	Home	1–1	Duve 48'	23,000	
8	13 September 1988	17:45	Bayer Leverkusen	Away	2–2	Steubing 57', Ottens 74'	8,000	
10	8 October 1988	15:30	Werder Bremen	Away	0–0	—	17,727	
9	15 October 1988	15:00	Borussia Mönchengladbach	Home	1–1	Gronau 58'	17,000	
11	22 October 1988	15:00	Borussia Dortmund	Home	1–0	Golke 49'	20,500	
12	29 October 1988	15:30	Hannover 96	Away	2–2	Bargfrede 41', Gronau 82'	20,000	
13	5 November 1988	14:30	Bayern Munich	Home	0–0	—	20,551	
14	12 November 1988	15:30	Stuttgarter Kickers	Away	2–2	Olck 43', Gronau 62'	7,000	
15	19 November 1988	14:15	Waldhof Mannheim	Home	2–1	Bockenfeld 71' (o.g.), Wenzel 75'	17,800	
16	26 November 1988	14:15	1. FC Köln	Home	0–1	—	20,551	
17	3 December 1988	15:30	Bayer Uerdingen	Away	0–0	—	8,000	
18	18 February 1989	15:30	1. FC Nürnberg	Away	3–5	Golke 6', Flad 21', Brunner 41' (o.g.)	18,000	
19	25 February 1989	15:30	VfL Bochum	Home	1–0	Zander 56'	17,300	
20	4 March 1989	15:30	Eintracht Frankfurt	Away	1–1	Flad 79' (pen.)	11,345	
21	11 March 1989	15:30	Karlsruher SC	Home	1–0	Zander 32'	19,100	
22	19 March 1989	17:30	VfB Stuttgart	Away	1–2	Golke 11'	21,000	
23	23 March 1989	20:00	Hamburger SV	Home	1–2	Wenzel 2'	53,950	
24	1 April 1989	15:30	1. FC Kaiserslautern	Away	0–1	—	16,626	
25	7 April 1989	19:30	Bayer Leverkusen	Home	2–0	Zander 3', Dahms 31'	20,200	
26	15 April 1989	15:30	Borussia Mönchengladbach	Away	2–2	Golke 20', Wenzel 65'	12,000	
27	29 April 1989	15:30	Werder Bremen	Home	1–3	Flad 34' (pen.)	20,551	
28	6 May 1989	15:30	Borussia Dortmund	Away	0–0	—	27,870	
29	13 May 1989	15:30	Hannover 96	Home	1–1	Zander 69'	15,100	
30	20 May 1989	15:30	Bayern Munich	Away	1–2	Duve 55'	25,000	
31	25 May 1989	19:30	Stuttgarter Kickers	Home	1–0	Zander 26'	16,100	
32	2 June 1989	20:00	Waldhof Mannheim	Away	1–2	Zander 63'	10,177	
33	10 June 1989	15:30	1. FC Köln	Away	2–4	Golke 5', Großkopf 85'	9,000	
34	17 June 1989	15:30	Bayer Uerdingen	Home	5–1	Golke 52', 54', 81', Duve 60', Zander 74'	16,250	

=== DFB-Pokal ===
Win	Draw	Loss

DFB-Pokal match results
Round	Date	Opponent	Venue	Result F–A	Scorers	Attendance	Ref.
First round	5 August 1988	1. FC Kaiserslautern	Away	1–2	Bargfrede 90'	12,650	

== Appearances and goals ==
Players having played at least one first-team match
Pos.	Nat.	Name	Bundesliga		DFB-Pokal		Total	
Pos.	Nat.	Name	Apps	Goals	Apps	Goals	Apps	Goals
GK	GER	Volker Ippig	31	0	1	0	32	0
GK	GER	Klaus Thomforde	3	0	0	0	3	0
DF	GER	Jens Duve	33	3	1	0	34	3
DF	CZE	Jan Kocian	28	2	1	0	29	2
DF	GER	Reinhard Kock	1	0	0	0	1	0
DF	GER	Bernhard Olck	25	1	0	0	25	1
DF	GER	André Trulsen	32	0	1	0	33	0
DF	GER	Klaus Ulbricht	3	0	0	0	3	0
MF	GER	Hans-Jürgen Bargfrede	13	1	1	1	14	2
MF	GER	Michael Dahms	22	1	1	0	23	1
MF	GER	Egon Flad	32	4	1	0	33	4
MF	GER	André Golke	33	9	1	0	34	9
MF	GER	Jürgen Gronau	33	4	1	0	34	4
MF	GER	Peter Knäbel	21	0	1	0	22	0
MF	GER	Klaus Ottens	25	1	1	0	26	1
MF	GER	Dirk Zander	32	7	1	0	33	7
FW	GER	André Bistram	3	0	0	0	3	0
FW	GER	Jörn Großkopf	7	1	0	0	7	1
FW	JPN	Kazuo Ozaki	6	0	0	0	6	0
FW	GER	Waldemar Steubing	29	2	1	0	30	2
FW	GER	Rüdiger Wenzel	15	3	0	0	15	3
