= Bargfrede =

Bargfrede is a surname. Notable people with the surname include:

- Hans-Jürgen Bargfrede (born 1959), German footballer
- Heinz-Günter Bargfrede (born 1942), German politician
- Philipp Bargfrede (born 1989), German footballer
