= 2009–10 SV Werder Bremen season =

SV Werder Bremen
2009–10 season
- Manager: Thomas Schaaf
- Stadium: Weser-Stadion
- Bundesliga: 3rd
- DFB-Pokal: Runners-up
- UEFA Europa League: Round of 16
- Top goalscorer: Claudio Pizarro (16)
Home colours	Away colours	Third colours

During the 2009–10 German football season, SV Werder Bremen competed in the Bundesliga.

== Season summary ==
After last season's poor league form, 2009–10 saw a return to business for Bremen as they finished third, qualifying for the Champions League qualifying rounds. Bremen also reached the DFB-Pokal final for the second season running, but lost to Bayern Munich.

== Players ==
=== First-team squad ===
Squad at end of season

Note: Flags indicate national team as defined under FIFA eligibility rules; some limited exceptions apply. Players may hold more than one non-FIFA nationality.

No.	Pos.	Nation	Player
1	GK	GER	Tim Wiese
2	DF	GER	Sebastian Boenisch (Note: Boenisch was born in Gliwice, Poland, but was raised in Germany from the age of 1 and represented Germany at U-20 and U-21 level before making his international debut for Poland in September 2010.)
3	DF	FIN	Petri Pasanen
4	DF	BRA	Naldo
6	MF	GER	Tim Borowski
8	DF	GER	Clemens Fritz
9	FW	SWE	Markus Rosenberg
10	MF	GER	Marko Marin (Note: Marin was born in Bosanska Gradiška, SFR Yugoslavia (now Bosnia and Herzegovina), but was raised in Germany from the age of 2 and represented Germany at U-16, U-17, U-18 and U-21 level before making his international debut for Germany in May 2008.)
11	MF	GER	Mesut Özil
14	MF	GER	Aaron Hunt
15	DF	AUT	Sebastian Prödl
16	DF	TUN	Aymen Abdennour (on loan from Étoile du Sahel)
17	MF	BIH	Said Husejinović
19	FW	GER	Sandro Wagner
20	MF	DEN	Daniel Jensen
21	GK	GER	Sebastian Mielitz

No.	Pos.	Nation	Player
22	MF	GER	Torsten Frings (captain)
23	FW	POR	Hugo Almeida
24	FW	PER	Claudio Pizarro
25	MF	GER	Peter Niemeyer
27	DF	GER	Niklas Andersen
29	DF	GER	Per Mertesacker
30	FW	HUN	Márkó Futács
31	MF	GER	Kevin Artmann
32	MF	GER	José-Alex Ikeng (Note: Ikeng was born in Bafia, Cameroon, but also qualified to represent Germany internationally and represented Germany at U-18 level.)
33	GK	GER	Christian Vander
41	DF	GER	Dominik Schmidt
42	GK	GER	Felix Wiedwald
43	FW	GER	Pascal Testroet
44	MF	GER	Philipp Bargfrede
45	DF	GER	Timo Perthel
46	MF	TUR	Onur Ayık (Note: Ayık was born in Walsrode, West Germany (now Germany), but also qualified to represent Turkey internationally and represented them at U-16, U-18, U-19, and U-23 level.)

=== Left club during season ===
Note: Flags indicate national team as defined under FIFA eligibility rules; some limited exceptions apply. Players may hold more than one non-FIFA nationality.

No.	Pos.	Nation	Player
5	DF	SRB	Duško Tošić (released)
7	MF	CRO	Jurica Vranješ (on loan to Gençlerbirliği)
18	FW	CIV	Boubacar Sanogo (to Saint-Étienne)

No.	Pos.	Nation	Player
34	FW	AUT	Martin Harnik (Note: Harnik was born in Hamburg, West Germany (now Germany), but also qualified to represent Austria internationally through his father and represented Austria at U-19, U-20, and U-21 level before making his international debut for Austria in August 2007.) (on loan to Fortuna Düsseldorf)
39	FW	BOL	Marcelo Moreno (on loan from Shakhtar Donetsk)
47	FW	GER	Torsten Oehrl (on loan to Fortuna Düsseldorf)

== Results ==
=== Bundesliga ===
==== League table ====
Pos	Team	Pld	W	D	L	GF	GA	GD	Pts	Qualification or relegation
1	Bayern Munich (C)	34	20	10	4	72	31	+41	70	Qualification to Champions League group stage
2	Schalke 04	34	19	8	7	53	31	+22	65	Qualification to Champions League group stage
3	Werder Bremen	34	17	10	7	71	40	+31	61	Qualification to Champions League play-off round
4	Bayer Leverkusen	34	15	14	5	65	38	+27	59	Qualification to Europa League play-off round
5	Borussia Dortmund	34	16	9	9	54	42	+12	57	Qualification to Europa League play-off round

Source: kicker.de (in German)
Rules for classification: 1) points; 2) goal difference; 3) number of goals scored.
(C) Champions

==== Results summary ====
Overall								Home						Away					
Pld	W	D	L	GF	GA	GD	Pts	W	D	L	GF	GA	GD	W	D	L	GF	GA	GD
34	17	10	7	71	40	+31	61	8	6	3	34	21	+13	9	4	4	37	19	+18

Source: Soccerway

==== Matches ====
8 August 2009 1	Werder Bremen	2–3	Eintracht Frankfurt	Bremen
15:30 CEST (UTC+2)	Özil 13' (pen.); Frings (yellow card) 29'; Sanogo 44'; Prödl (yellow card) 79' (yellow-red card) 90+1'	Report	Amanatidis 6', 42'; Teber (yellow card) 54'; Fenin 71'; Russ (yellow card) 90+1'	Stadium: Weserstadion; Referee: Helmut Fleischer; Assistant referees: Sönke Glindemann, Guido Kleve; Fourth official: Christian Fischer

15 August 2009 2	Bayern Munich	1–1	Werder Bremen	Munich
15:30 CEST (UTC+2)	Schweinsteiger (yellow card) 38'; Gómez 72'	Report	Özil 39'; Fritz (yellow card) 83'	Stadium: Allianz Arena; Referee: Manuel Gräfe; Assistant referees: Christian Dingert, Markus Hacker; Fourth official: Tobias Stieler

23 August 2009 3	Werder Bremen	3–0	Borussia Mönchengladbach	Bremen
17:30 CEST (UTC+2)	Pizarro 21', 38'; Özil (penalty missed) 56'; Borowski (yellow card) 61'; Naldo 88'	Report	Bradley (yellow card) 21'; Levels (yellow card) 53'; Arango (yellow card) 78'	Stadium: Weserstadion; Referee: Günter Perl; Assistant referees: Josef Maier, Mike Pickel; Fourth official: Sascha Thielert

30 August 2009 4	Hertha BSC	2–3	Werder Bremen	Berlin
15:30 CEST (UTC+2)	Piszczek 77'; Ebert 90+1'	Report	Bargfrede (yellow card) 55'; Özil 57'; Borowski 74'; Naldo 83'	Stadium: Olympiastadion; Referee: Thorsten Kinhöfer; Assistant referees: Christian Fischer, Detlef Scheppe; Fourth official: Thomas Frank

13 September 2009 5	Werder Bremen	0–0	Hannover 96	Bremen
15:30 CEST (UTC+2)	Frings (yellow card) 41'; Borowski (yellow card) 86'	Report	Djakpa (yellow card) 27'	Stadium: Weserstadion; Referee: Markus Schmidt; Assistant referees: Kai Voss, Wolfgang Walz; Fourth official: Tobias Welz

20 September 2009 6	Bayer Leverkusen	0–0	Werder Bremen	Leverkusen
17:30 CEST (UTC+2)	Hyypiä (yellow card) 77'	Report		Stadium: BayArena; Referee: Peter Sippel; Assistant referees: Tobias Christ, Walter Hofmann; Fourth official: Thorsten Schiffner

26 September 2009 7	Werder Bremen	3–0	Mainz 05	Bremen
15:30 CEST (UTC+2)	Hunt 38'; Pizarro 71', 82'	Report	Lőw (yellow card) 72'	Stadium: Weserstadion; Referee: Felix Brych; Assistant referees: Marco Achmüller, Robert Hartmann; Fourth official: Christoph Bornhorst

4 October 2009 8	VfB Stuttgart	0–2	Werder Bremen	Stuttgart
15:30 CEST (UTC+2)	Cacau (yellow card) 59'; Delpierre (yellow card) 68'	Report	Pizarro 3'; Naldo (yellow card) 26'; Hunt 51'	Stadium: Mercedes-Benz Arena; Referee: Florian Meyer; Assistant referees: Carsten Kadach, Frank Willenborg; Fourth official: Holger Henschel

17 October 2009 9	Werder Bremen	2–0	1899 Hoffenheim	Bremen
15:30 CEST (UTC+2)	Wiese (yellow card) 14'; Pizarro 18', (yellow card) 61'; Mertesacker 22'; Bargfrede (yellow card) 71'	Report	Carlos Eduardo (penalty missed) 14'; Salihović (yellow card) 15'; Compper (yellow card) 23'; Šimunić (yellow card) 40'; Vorsah (yellow card) 52'; Luiz Gustavo (yellow card) 56'; Obasi (yellow card) 66'; Vukčević (yellow card) 84'	Stadium: Weserstadion; Referee: Knut Kircher; Assistant referees: Robert Kempter, Stefan Lupp; Fourth official: Bibiana Steinhaus

25 October 2009 10	VfL Bochum	1–4	Werder Bremen	Bochum
17:30 CET (UTC+1)	Šesták 1'; Freier (yellow card) 73'; Azaouagh (yellow card) 76'	Report	Hunt 9'; Marin 31'; Borowski 76'; Özil 90+1'	Stadium: RewirpowerSTADION; Referee: Peter Sippel; Assistant referees: Tobias Christ, Walter Hofmann; Fourth official: Guido Kleve

31 October 2009 11	1. FC Nürnberg	2–2	Werder Bremen	Nuremberg
15:30 CET (UTC+1)	Eigler 3'; Diekmeier (yellow card) 15'; Bunjaku 33'; Schäfer (yellow card) 44'; Wolf (yellow card) 55'; Judt (yellow card) 79'; Pinola (yellow card) 90+3'	Report	Fritz (yellow card) 42'; Marin (yellow card) 44'; Hunt 72', 90+2'	Stadium: easyCredit-Stadion; Referee: Guido Winkmann; Assistant referees: Christian Bandurski, Dirk Margenberg; Fourth official: Florian Steuer

8 November 2009 12	Werder Bremen	1–1	Borussia Dortmund	Bremen
17:30 CET (UTC+1)	Özil 36'; Bargfrede (yellow card) 73'	Report	Barrios 54', (yellow card) 66'; Valdez (yellow card) 57'	Stadium: Weserstadion; Referee: Manuel Gräfe; Assistant referees: Christian Dingert, Markus Hacker; Fourth official: Kai Voss

21 November 2009 13	SC Freiburg	0–6	Werder Bremen	Freiburg
15:30 CET (UTC+1)		Report	Almeida 33', 57'; Marin 54'; Özil 67'; Naldo 73' (pen.); Rosenberg 82', (yellow card) 87'	Stadium: Badenova-Stadion; Referee: Thorsten Kinhöfer; Assistant referees: Christian Fischer, Detlef Scheppe; Fourth official: Volker Wezel

28 November 2009 14	Werder Bremen	2–2	VfL Wolfsburg	Bremen
15:30 CET (UTC+1)	Almeida 62'; Jensen (yellow card) 81'; Mertesacker 90+1'	Report	Džeko 42', 85'; Hasebe (yellow card) 51'; Ziani (yellow card) 90'; Kahlenberg (yellow card) 90+1'; Benaglio (yellow card) 90+3'	Stadium: Weserstadion; Referee: Günter Perl; Assistant referees: Frederick Assmuth, Josef Maier; Fourth official: Thomas Metzen

6 December 2009 15	1. FC Köln	0–0	Werder Bremen	Cologne
15:30 CET (UTC+1)	Mohamad (yellow card) 28'; Schorch (yellow card) 54'; Petit (yellow card) 71'; Maniche (yellow card) 75'	Report	Naldo (yellow card) 12'; Boenisch (yellow card) 50'; Frings (yellow card) 76'	Stadium: RheinEnergieStadion; Referee: Jochen Drees; Assistant referees: Torsten Bauer, Markus Wingenbach; Fourth official: Mark Borsch

12 December 2009 16	Werder Bremen	0–2	Schalke 04	Bremen
18:30 CET (UTC+1)	Boenisch (yellow card) 51'; Hunt (yellow card) 61'; Frings (yellow card) 75'	Report	Kurányi 47', (yellow card) 63'; Morávek 72'; Farfán (yellow card) 85'	Stadium: Weserstadion; Referee: Helmut Fleischer; Assistant referees: Sönke Glindemann, Guido Kleve; Fourth official: Norbert Grudzinski

20 December 2009 17	Hamburger SV	2–1	Werder Bremen	Hamburg
15:30 CET (UTC+1)	Mathijsen 9'; Rincón (yellow card) 12'; Boateng (red card) 32'; Jansen 36'; Aogo (yellow card) 67'; Demel (yellow card) 77'; Jarolím (yellow card) 78'	Report	Prödl (yellow card) 38'; Jensen (yellow card) 50'; Naldo (yellow card) 73', (goal) 90+3'; Hunt (yellow card) 77'	Stadium: HSH Nordbank Arena; Referee: Florian Meyer; Assistant referees: Carsten Kadach, Frank Willenborg; Fourth official: Holger Henschel

16 January 2010 18	Eintracht Frankfurt	1–0	Werder Bremen	Frankfurt
15:30 CET (UTC+1)	Teber (yellow card) 27'; Russ 57'; Chris (yellow card) 90+3'	Report	Marin (yellow card) 82'; Almeida (yellow card) 85'	Stadium: Commerzbank-Arena; Referee: Michael Weiner; Assistant referees: Thomas Frank, Norbert Grudzinski; Fourth official: Harm Osmers

23 January 2010 19	Werder Bremen	2–3	Bayern Munich	Bremen
15:30 CET (UTC+1)	Hunt 10'; Wiese (yellow card) 43'; Almeida 75'	Report	Müller 25'; Olić 35'; Van Bommel (yellow card) 40'; Robben 78'; Demichelis (yellow card) 84'	Stadium: Weserstadion; Referee: Knut Kircher; Assistant referees: Robert Kempter, Stefan Lupp; Fourth official: Carsten Kadach

30 January 2010 20	Borussia Mönchengladbach	4–3	Werder Bremen	Mönchengladbach
15:30 CET (UTC+1)	Reus 4'; Colautti 13'; Bobadilla 18', 35', (yellow card) 35'; Bailly (yellow card) 84'	Report	Özil 26'; Pizarro 40', (yellow card) 66'; Naldo (yellow card) 61'; Fritz (yellow card) 77'; Frings 85' (pen.)	Stadium: Borussia-Park; Referee: Felix Brych; Assistant referees: Robert Hartmann, Guido Kleve; Fourth official: Florian Steuer

5 February 2010 21	Werder Bremen	2–1	Hertha BSC	Bremen
20:30 CET (UTC+1)	Marin 66'; Fritz (yellow card) 67'; Pizarro 81'	Report	Kobiashvili (yellow card) 33'; Gekas 68'; Kringe (yellow card) 80'	Stadium: Weserstadion; Referee: Günter Perl; Assistant referees: Josef Maier, Georg Schalk; Fourth official: Bibiana Steinhaus

13 February 2010 22	Hannover 96	1–5	Werder Bremen	Hanover
15:30 CET (UTC+1)	Eggimann (yellow card) 44'; Schulz 59'; Lala (yellow card) 64'; Schlaudraff (yellow card) 67'	Report	Niemeyer 11'; Naldo 18'; Andreasen 26' (o.g.); Hunt 44'; Pizarro 68'	Stadium: AWD-Arena; Referee: Markus Schmidt; Assistant referees: Kai Voss, Wolfgang Walz; Fourth official: Christian Schößling

21 February 2010 23	Werder Bremen	2–2	Bayer Leverkusen	Bremen
17:30 CET (UTC+1)	Pizarro 34', (yellow card) 71'; Borowski (yellow card) 53'; Abdennour (yellow card) 68'; Frings (yellow card) 84'; Mertesacker 90+2'	Report	Derdiyok 29', (yellow card) 82'; Reinartz (yellow card) 37'; Kroos 57', (yellow card) 90+4'; Schwaab (yellow card) 59'; Vidal (yellow card) 84'	Stadium: Weserstadion; Referee: Michael Weiner; Assistant referees: Thomas Frank, Norbert Grudzinski; Fourth official: Christoph Bornhorst

27 February 2010 24	Mainz 05	1–2	Werder Bremen	Mainz
15:30 CET (UTC+1)	Heller (red card) 13'; Bancé 45'; Polanski (yellow card) 88'; Soto (yellow card) 90+1'	Report	Hunt (yellow card) 13'; Abdennour (yellow card) 21'; Borowski 31'; Prödl 50'; Pasanen (yellow card) 89'	Stadium: Bruchwegstadion; Referee: Babak Rafati; Assistant referees: Holger Henschel, Patrick Ittrich; Fourth official: Dirk Margenberg

6 March 2010 25	Werder Bremen	2–2	VfB Stuttgart	Bremen
15:30 CET (UTC+1)	Frings (yellow card) 74', (goal) 81' (pen.); Almeida 75'	Report	Pogrebnyak 15'; Khedira 43'; Delpierre (yellow card) 89'	Stadium: Weserstadion; Referee: Felix Brych; Assistant referees: Frederick Assmuth, Tobias Stieler; Fourth official: Bastian Dankert

14 March 2010 26	1899 Hoffenheim	0–1	Werder Bremen	Sinsheim
15:30 CET (UTC+1)	Šimunić (yellow card) 83'	Report	Pizarro 80'	Stadium: Rhein-Neckar-Arena; Referee: Peter Sippel; Assistant referees: Tobias Christ, Walter Hofmann; Fourth official: Thomas Metzen

20 March 2010 27	Werder Bremen	3–2	VfL Bochum	Bremen
15:30 CET (UTC+1)	Borowski (yellow card) 24'; Naldo (yellow card) 46'; Pizarro 58', (yellow card) 72'; Marin 65'; Frings 81'	Report	Šesták 14'; Dedić 63'	Stadium: Weserstadion; Referee: Markus Wingenbach; Assistant referees: Guido Kleve, Daniel Siebert; Fourth official: Markus Hacker

27 March 2010 28	Werder Bremen	4–2	1. FC Nürnberg	Bremen
15:30 CET (UTC+1)	Mertesacker 1', 20'; Borowski 36'; Frings (red card) 82'; Fritz 90+2'	Report	Gündoğan (yellow card) 15'; Frantz 47'; Choupo-Moting 63' (pen.)	Stadium: Weserstadion; Referee: Markus Schmidt; Assistant referees: Kai Voss, Wolfgang Walz; Fourth official: Thorsten Schriever

3 April 2010 29	Borussia Dortmund	2–1	Werder Bremen	Dortmund
15:30 CEST (UTC+2)	Großkreutz 9'; Subotić 22'; Błaszczykowski (yellow card) 60'	Report	Hunt 65'; Bargfrede (yellow card) 89'	Stadium: Signal Iduna Park; Referee: Babak Rafati; Assistant referees: Holger Henschel, Patrick Ittrich; Fourth official: Christoph Bornhorst

10 April 2010 30	Werder Bremen	4–0	SC Freiburg	Bremen
15:30 CEST (UTC+2)	Pizarro 35', 56'; Hunt 53'; Özil 66'	Report		Stadium: Weserstadion; Referee: Felix Brych; Assistant referees: Marco Achmüller, Robert Hartmann; Fourth official: René Kunsleben

17 April 2010 31	VfL Wolfsburg	2–4	Werder Bremen	Wolfsburg
15:30 CEST (UTC+2)	Džeko 18'; Grafite 39'; Misimović (yellow card) 54'	Report	Frings 38' (pen.), 62', (yellow card) 59'; Pizarro 49'; Almeida 75', (yellow card) 75'; Borowski (yellow card) 77'	Stadium: Volkswagen Arena; Referee: Jochen Drees; Assistant referees: Torsten Bauer, Florian Steuer; Fourth official: Manuel Kunzmann

24 April 2010 32	Werder Bremen	1–0	1. FC Köln	Bremen
18:30 CEST (UTC+2)	Özil (yellow card) 90'; Frings 90+1' (pen.)	Report	Ehret (yellow card) 49'; Brečko (yellow card) 52'; Geromel (red card) 90'; McKenna (yellow card) 90+2'	Stadium: Weserstadion; Referee: Guido Winkmann; Assistant referees: Christian Bandurski, Dirk Margenberg; Fourth official: Bibiana Steinhaus

1 May 2010 33	Schalke 04	0–2	Werder Bremen	Gelsenkirchen
15:30 CEST (UTC+2)	Rafinha (yellow card) 70'	Report	Özil 55', (yellow card) 60'; Almeida 64'; Borowski (yellow card) 73'	Stadium: Veltins-Arena; Referee: Knut Kircher; Assistant referees: Stefan Lupp, Tobias Stieler; Fourth official: Stefan Trautmann

8 May 2010 34	Werder Bremen	1–1	Hamburger SV	Bremen
15:30 CEST (UTC+2)	Bargfrede (yellow card) 32'; Pizarro 58'; Frings (yellow card) 76'	Report	Jarolím (yellow card) 14'; Pitroipa (yellow card) 77'; Van Nistelrooy 82'	Stadium: Weserstadion; Referee: Michael Weiner; Assistant referees: Thomas Frank, Tobias Welz; Fourth official: Harm Osmers

=== UEFA Europa League ===
==== Play-off round ====
20 August 2009	Werder Bremen (Germany)	6–3	(Kazakhstan) Aktobe	Weser-Stadion, Bremen
21:00	Boenisch 17'; Pizarro 28'; Naldo 36', 65'; Almeida 60'; Özil 67' (pen.)	Report	Strukov 21', 32'; Smakov 87'	Attendance: 21,446; Referee: Tony Asumaa (Finland)

27 August 2009	Aktobe (Kazakhstan)	0–2	(Germany) Werder Bremen	Aktobe Central Stadium, Aktobe
16:00		Report	Pizarro 10', 45+1'	Attendance: 11,000; Referee: Vladimír Hriňák (Slovakia)

Werder Bremen won 8–3 on aggregate.

==== Group stage ====
Pos	Team	Pld	W	D	L	GF	GA	GD	Pts	Qualification	BRM	ATH	NCL	AUS
1	(Germany) Werder Bremen	6	5	1	0	17	6	+11	16	Advance to knockout phase	—	3–1	4–1	2–0
2	(Spain) Athletic Bilbao	6	3	1	2	10	8	+2	10	Advance to knockout phase	0–3	—	2–1	3–0
3	(Portugal) Nacional	6	1	2	3	11	12	−1	5		2–3	1–1	—	5–1
4	Austria Wien	6	0	2	4	4	16	−12	2		2–2	0–3	1–1	—

Source: Soccerway

17 September 2009	Nacional (Portugal)	2–3	(Germany) Werder Bremen	Estádio da Madeira, Funchal
21:05	Lopes 68'; Halliche 75'	Report	Frings 39' (pen.); Pizarro 55', 85'	Attendance: 3,082; Referee: Svein Oddvar Moen (Norway)

1 October 2009	Werder Bremen (Germany)	3–1	(Spain) Athletic Bilbao	Weser-Stadion, Bremen
19:00	Hunt 18'; Naldo 41'; Frings 90+4' (pen.)	Report	Llorente 90+1'	Attendance: 24,305; Referee: Alexandru Tudor (Romania)

22 October 2009	Austria Wien	2–2	(Germany) Werder Bremen	Franz Horr Stadium, Vienna
19:00	Sulimani 73'; Schumacher 87'	Report	Pizarro 19', 63'	Attendance: 11,000; Referee: Paolo Tagliavento (Italy)

5 November 2009	Werder Bremen (Germany)	2–0	Austria Wien	Weser-Stadion, Bremen
21:05	Borowski 81'; Almeida 84'	Report		Attendance: 25,121; Referee: Stefan Johannesson (Sweden)

3 December 2009	Werder Bremen (Germany)	4–1	(Portugal) Nacional	Weser-Stadion, Bremen
19:00	Rosenberg 31', 34'; Moreno 84'; Marin 90+2'	Report	Micael 61'	Attendance: 24,784; Referee: Alon Yefet (Israel)

16 December 2009	Athletic Bilbao (Spain)	0–3	(Germany) Werder Bremen	San Mamés Stadium, Bilbao
21:05		Report	Pizarro 13'; Naldo 20'; Rosenberg 36'	Attendance: 27,500; Referee: Serge Gumienny (Belgium)

==== Knockout phase ====
===== Round of 32 =====
18 February 2010	Twente (Netherlands)	1–0	(Germany) Werder Bremen	De Grolsch Veste, Enschede
19:00	Janssen 38'	Report		Attendance: 24,000; Referee: Lucílio Batista (Portugal)

25 February 2010	Werder Bremen (Germany)	4–1	(Netherlands) Twente	Weser-Stadion, Bremen
21:05	Pizarro 15', 20', 58'; Naldo 27'	Report	De Jong 33'	Attendance: 20,963; Referee: Kristinn Jakobsson (Iceland)

Werder Bremen won 4–2 on aggregate.

===== Round of 16 =====
11 March 2010	Valencia (Spain)	1–1	(Germany) Werder Bremen	Mestalla Stadium, Valencia
21:05	Mata 57'	Report	Frings 24' (pen.)	Attendance: 40,000; Referee: Martin Atkinson (England)

18 March 2010	Werder Bremen (Germany)	4–4	(Spain) Valencia	Weser-Stadion, Bremen
19:00	Almeida 26'; Frings 57' (pen.); Marin 62'; Pizarro 84'	Report	Villa 2', 45', 65'; Mata 15'	Attendance: 24,200; Referee: Kevin Blom (Netherlands)

Valencia 5–5 Werder Bremen on aggregate. Valencia won on away goals.
