= 2015–16 SV Werder Bremen season =

Werder Bremen
2015–16 season
- President: Hubertus Hess-Grunewald
- Head coach: Viktor Skripnik
- Stadium: Weserstadion
- Bundesliga: 13th
- DFB-Pokal: Semi-finals
- Top goalscorer: Claudio Pizarro
Home colours	Away colours	Third colours

The 2015–16 SV Werder Bremen season is the 106th season in the club's football history. In 2015–16 the club plays in the Bundesliga, the top tier of German football league system. It is the clubs 33rd consecutive season in this league, having been promoted from the 2. Bundesliga in 1981.

The club also is taking part in the 2015–16 edition of the DFB-Pokal.

== Season overview ==
=== August ===
On 8 August, Werder Bremen started the season by winning against third division side Würzburger Kickers. Werder lost the opening match of Bundesliga to Schalke 04 at home by a margin of 0–3. Werder earned their first point in Bundesliga after 1–1 draw away at Hertha BSC. Bremen earned their first win of the season by beating Borussia Mönchengladbach 2–1 at home with impressive performance from goal scorer Jannik Vestergaard and Aron Jóhannsson

=== September ===
After the international break, Werder continued their winning form by beating TSG Hoffenheim 3–1. The game appeared to be headed to a draw, but a two injury time goals from Anthony Ujah and Zlatko Junuzović in a matter of two minutes sealed the victory for Werder. However, Werder lost their way and winning form by losing to newly promoted team FC Ingolstadt and Darmstadt 98. Werder also saw Philipp Bargfrede and Fin Bartels getting marching orders against Ingolstadt and Darmstadt respectively. Aron Jóhannsson suffered a hip injury during training with no timeline given by Werder's medical staff on his return. Werder lost their third-straight match with a defeat to Bayer Leverkusen. Head coach Viktor Skrypnyk conceded that losing three match in a row was a big disappointment for the team.

=== October ===
Werder continued their losing trend by losing 1–0 to lowly-placed Hannover 96. This was the fourth consecutive loss for Werder, with unbeaten Bayern Munich looking to pounce on the team when they meet at Weserstadion after international break. Werder gave a fighting performance against league leaders Bayern and came close to securing a point through Anthony Ujah. Bremen, however, could not prevent Bayern from becoming the first-ever team to win nine opening matches Captain Clemens Fritz played his 250th match for Bremen but was not satisfied with the loss against Bayern after a spirited performance. Sporting Director Thomas Eichin, however, was at least pleased with the response of the team after having lost four-straight Bundesliga games. After losing five consecutive matches, The Whites showed strength and character to outclass FSV Mainz 05 courtesy of an Ujah brace. The next match for Bremen was in DFB-Pokal, where they knocked off 1. FC Köln 1–0 to reach the last 16 of the competition. The month of October ended with a home match against second-placed Borussia Dortmund, which ended in 1–3 defeat. Sporting Director Eichin was happy with the spirited performance of Bremen and conceded that goal by Henrikh Mkhitaryan just before the half-time break changed the game in favour of Dortmund.

=== November ===
The Whites started the month with a hard-fought 2–1 victory away at struggling FC Augsburg. The match will be remembered for Claudio Pizzaro's first goal of his third stint at Werder and his 177th Bundesliga goal, the highest-ever total by foreign player in the Bundesliga. In the next match, however, Werder faced their worst defeat of the season when they were thrashed 6–0 at the hands of VfL Wolfsburg. After the humiliating loss, Werder Bremen next faces their fiercest northern neighbour Hamburger SV for the 103rd time in the Bundesliga. Despite Werder historically tallying more wins (37) over their opponent (32), Hamburg appeared more up-beat about facing Werder after its impressive win over Borussia Dortmund the week prior. Werder lost the match 1–3, increasing the mounting pressure on coach Viktor Skripnik.

=== December ===
The month of December was received with positive news that forward Aron Jóhannsson, who has been out of action since October, has started training sessions. The aim for Jóhannsson is to be in full training before the second half of the season begins after the winter break. On 6 December, Werder traveled to VfB Stuttgart and battled hard in the second half to rescue a point after Lukas Rupp put the hosts in front. Anthony Ujah scored the equaliser; his consistent goal-scoring performances have caught the attention of Stoke City for the upcoming winter transfer window. In Werder's next match, Ujah was again the centre of focus, missing a penalty in the next match against his former club, Köln. Werder were leading when Ujah missed the penalty, whereupon Köln compounded the misery for the Green Whites by leveling with a controversial goal. Werder are now without a win in their last six home games, and are desperate to win in their next match away at Borussia Mönchengladbach in the DFB-Pokal. The desperate Werder battled hard with courage and passion to come from behind to defeat Mönchengladbach 3–4 to earn a quarter-final spot in the DFB-Pokal. It was the night to remember for the Green-Whites, especially the young stars of Werder, such as Levin Öztunalı, Florian Grillitsch and Janek Sternberg, the latter who scored his first goal for Bremen. The DFB-Pokal win set up a quarter-final match away at Bayer Leverkusen, which will be played in the second week of February. Werder is set to face fellow Bundesliga strugglers Eintracht Frankfurt for the last game before the winter break commences. Head coach Viktor Skripnik is placing special importance to the match, terming it as "mini final" with players determined to give everything against Frankfurt. Werder ended 2015 with a loss against Frankfurt, thus ending the first half of the Bundesliga season in the relegation zone.

=== January ===
The start of new year saw Werder Bremen sign 21-year-old Hungarian midfielder László Kleinheisler and Senegalese centre back Papy Djilobodji on loan from Chelsea until the end of the season. Meanwhile, long-serving Felix Kroos and Levent Ayçiçek has been loaned out to 1. FC Union Berlin and 1860 München respectively until the summer of 2016. The new year began with an impressive win for the Green Whites at Schalke 04, with captain Clemens Fritz leading from the front by scoring an equalizing goal and providing beautiful crosses for the next two goals. Unfortunately, Philipp Bargfrede suffered a meniscus tear in the game and will miss the remainder of the season. In the first home game of 2016, Werder played out a hard-earned draw against Hertha BSC. Despite going 2–0 down and later 3–1 down in the match, Werder fought valiantly to earn a 3–3 draw, with stunning goal by Fin Bartels and a superb header by Santiago García. Before the January transfer window closed, Bremen secured the services of midfielder Sambou Yatabaré from Olympiacos and centre back Miloš Veljković from Tottenham Hotspur.

=== February ===
Bremen's next match was against Borussia Mönchengladbach, who were looking to end their losing streak. Bremen lost 5–1, pushing them down to the relegation play-off position in the table, whilst moving Gladbach up to sixth and pushing for a Champions League spot. It was disappointing team performance by the Green-Whites, despite striker Claudio Pizarro scoring a goal in his 400th game. Thomas Eichin was critical of the effort put by the players and stated his expectation for "100 percent" effort from his players. After the demoralising loss, Bremen returned to cup competition to face Bayer Leverkusen in the DFB-Pokal quarter-finals. Bremen continued its good fortune in the cup by coming from behind to beat Leverkusen 1–3 and secure their place in the semi-final against reigning Bundesliga champions Bayern Munich. On 13 February, Werder faced fellow league strugglers Hoffenheim at Weserstadion. Papy Djilobodji scored a crucial debut goal to earn a vital point for Werder, keeping them above Hoffenheim in the relegation battle. The game also saw a significant milestone when newly appointed Julian Nagelsmann of Hoffenheim became the youngest-ever Bundesliga coach at 28 years of age. On 20 February, Bremen suffered another defeat against newcomers FC Ingolstadt. The last match of the month saw Bremen hosting Darmstadt 98 for its 23rd league game. Eichin admitted that after the loss to Ingolstadt, the game against Darmstadt is like a must win encounter for Bremen. Bremen ultimately drew the match 2–2.

=== March ===
With mediocre performance in the previous month and with mounting pressure to avoid relegation, Werder Bremen started the month of March with impressive display of goal scoring to earn two vital victories against Leverkusen and Hannover. It was an important landmark for veteran goal scorer Pizarro who scored hat-trick against Bayer Leverkusen to become the oldest bundesliga player to score a hat-trick. Pizarro was also on target against Hannover, which moved him within one goal away from the record goal-scorer Marco Bode's tally of 101 goals for Werder Bremen. The next match saw Werder receive pounding from current champion and league leader Bayern Munich and losing 5-0 at Allianz Areana. The last match of the month saw Werder Bremen coming from behind to secure a point against high flying Mainz

=== April ===
The month of April saw Werder Bremens ambition to be in Bundesliga receive a massive dent as Werder lost consecutive matches to Borrusia Dortmund and struggling Augsburg. However, Werder Bremen resumed their Bundesliga survival by beating Wolfsburg 3-2 at Weserstadion. Claudio Pizarro scored from the spot and thereby became Bremen's all-time leading goal scorer with 102 goals. Weder Bremen next assignment was semi-final of DFB pokal against Bayern Munich, which Bremen eventually lost 2-0 ending their any hope of silverware to an otherwise disappointing season. The last match of the month, saw Werder facing its fierce neighbour Hamburg. The game ended in 2-1 loss for Werder despite a goal from Anthony Ujah.

=== May ===
Werder Bremen came out of relegation zone after an emphatic victory over fellow strugglers VfB Stuttgart. Fin Bartels scored a brace for the Green-Whites and revived the hopes of survival in the bundesliga next season. However, Bremen came down to the relegation zone after earning a draw against Cologne in the next match. The final match of 2015-16 Bundesliga sees Werder Bremen facing their closest rival Eintracht Frankfurt in the relegation battle to decide who is guaranteed a place in the Bundesliga next season. The final match ended in a dramatic fashion when Papy Djilobodji gave the Green-whites much needed goal in the 88th minute to ensure Werder Bremen continues to be in top-flight of German football.

== Competitions ==
Win Draw Lose

=== Bundesliga ===
==== League table ====
Pos	Team	Pld	W	D	L	GF	GA	GD	Pts
11	FC Ingolstadt	34	10	10	14	33	42	−9	40
12	FC Augsburg	34	9	11	14	42	52	−10	38
13	Werder Bremen	34	10	8	16	50	65	−15	38
14	Darmstadt 98	34	9	11	14	38	53	−15	38
15	1899 Hoffenheim	34	9	10	15	39	54	−15	37

Source: DFB
Rules for classification: 1) Points; 2) Goal difference; 3) Goals scored; 4) Head-to-head points; 5) Head-to-head goal difference; 6) Head-to-head away goals scored; 7) Away goals scored; 8) Play-offs.

==== Results summary ====
Overall								Home						Away					
Pld	W	D	L	GF	GA	GD	Pts	W	D	L	GF	GA	GD	W	D	L	GF	GA	GD
34	10	8	16	50	65	−15	38	5	5	7	27	30	−3	5	3	9	23	35	−12

Last updated: 14 May 2016.
Source: Bundesliga

==== Results by round ====
Round	1	2	3	4	5	6	7	8	9	10	11	12	13	14	15	16	17	18	19	20	21	22	23	24	25	26	27	28	29	30	31	32	33	34
Ground	H	A	H	A	H	A	H	A	H	A	H	A	A	H	A	H	A	A	H	A	H	A	H	A	H	A	H	A	H	H	A	H	A	H
Result	L	D	W	W	L	L	L	L	L	W	L	W	L	L	D	D	L	W	D	L	D	L	D	W	W	L	D	L	L	W	L	W	D	W
Position	16	15	11	6	9	13	13	14	16	14	16	14	14	15	15	14	16	16	16	16	16	16	16	15	13	15	14	15	16	16	16	15	16	13

Updated to match(es) played on 14 May 2016. Source: Bundesliga
A = Away; H = Home; W = Win; D = Draw; L = Loss

==== Matches ====
15 August 2015 1	Werder Bremen	0–3	Schalke 04	Bremen
15:30 CEST (UTC+02:00)		Report	Gebre Selassie 34' (o.g.); Choupo-Moting 68'; Aogo (yellow card) 77'; Höger (yellow card) 80'; Huntelaar 85'	Stadium: Weserstadion; Attendance: 42,100; Referee: Daniel Siebert

21 August 2015 2	Hertha BSC	1–1	Werder Bremen	Berlin
20:30 CEST (UTC+02:00)	Stocker 6'	Report	Ujah 26'; Fritz (yellow card) 60'	Stadium: Olympiastadion; Attendance: 56,376; Referee: Sascha Stegemann

30 August 2015 3	Werder Bremen	2–1	Borussia Mönchengladbach	Bremen
17:30 CEST (UTC+02:00)	S. García (yellow card) 30'; Jóhannsson 39' (pen.); Vestergaard 53'; U. Garcia (yellow card) 62'; Wiedwald (yellow card) 90+4'	Report	Xhaka (yellow card) 24' (yellow-red card) 87'; Stindl 45'; Nordtveit (yellow card) 66'	Stadium: Weserstadion; Attendance: 42,100; Referee: Felix Zwayer

13 September 2015 4	TSG Hoffenheim	1–3	Werder Bremen	Sinsheim
15:30 CEST (UTC+02:00)	Vargas 49'; Volland (yellow card) 53'; Polanski (yellow card) 60'	Report	Junuzović (yellow card) 18', (goal) 45', 90+3'; Lukimya (yellow card) 66'; Fritz (yellow card) 69'; Ujah 90+2', (yellow card) 90+2'	Stadium: Wirsol Rhein-Neckar-Arena; Attendance: 28,312; Referee: Jochen Drees

19 September 2015 5	Werder Bremen	0–1	FC Ingolstadt	Bremen
15:30 CEST (UTC+02:00)	Gebre Selassie (yellow card) 56'; Lukimya (yellow card) 66'; Pizarro (yellow card) 86'; Bargfrede (red card) 90+4'	Report	Hübner (yellow card) 26'; Groß (yellow card) 28'; Suttner (yellow card) 39'; Morales (yellow card) 82'; Hartmann 90+3' (pen.)	Stadium: Weserstadion; Attendance: 40,500; Referee: Bastian Dankert

22 September 2015 6	Darmstadt 98	2–1	Werder Bremen	Darmstadt
20:00 CEST (UTC+02:00)	Holland (yellow card) 28'; Wagner 31' (pen.), 84'; Niemeyer (yellow card) 40'; Díaz (yellow card) 88'	Report	Bartels (yellow card) 10' (yellow-red card) 88'; Jóhannsson 19'; Wiedwald (yellow card) 30'	Stadium: Merck-Stadion am Böllenfalltor; Attendance: 17,000; Referee: Guido Winkmann

26 September 2015 7	Werder Bremen	0–3	Bayer Leverkusen	Bremen
15:30 CEST (UTC+02:00)	S. García (yellow card) 39'	Report	Mehmedi 31'; Bellarabi (yellow card) 43'; Brandt 58'; Kampl 65'; Donati (yellow card) 83'	Stadium: Weserstadion; Attendance: 40,005; Referee: Wolfgang Stark

3 October 2015 8	Hannover 96	1–0	Werder Bremen	Hanover
15:30 CEST (UTC+02:00)	Sané (yellow card) 19', (goal) 55'; Schulz (yellow card) 51'; Gülselam (yellow card) 89'; Zieler (yellow card) 90+2'	Report	Bartels (yellow card) 36'	Stadium: HDI-Arena; Attendance: 49,000; Referee: Peter Sippel

17 October 2015 9	Werder Bremen	0–1	Bayern Munich	Bremen
15:30 CEST (UTC+02:00)	S. García (yellow card) 60'; Bargfrede (yellow card) 80'	Report	Müller 23'; Rafinha (yellow card) 42'; Kimmich (yellow card) 82'	Stadium: Weserstadion; Attendance: 42,100; Referee: Christian Dingert

24 October 2015 10	Mainz 05	1–3	Werder Bremen	Mainz
15:30 CEST (UTC+02:00)	Balogun (yellow card) 62'; Jairo (yellow card) 79'; Muto 90'	Report	Fritz (yellow card) 11'; Ujah 39', 44'; Bartels 45+3'	Stadium: Coface Arena; Attendance: 30,837; Referee: Robert Hartmann

31 October 2015 11	Werder Bremen	1–3	Borussia Dortmund	Bremen
15:30 CET (UTC+01:00)	Ujah 32'; Sternberg (yellow card) 55'; Fritz (yellow card) 60'; Gálvez (yellow card) 64'	Report	Reus 9', 72'; Mkhitaryan 44'	Stadium: Weserstadion; Attendance: 42,100; Referee: Tobias Welz

8 November 2015 12	FC Augsburg	1–2	Werder Bremen	Augsburg
17:30 CET (UTC+01:00)	Kohr (yellow card) 3'; Verhaegh 90+1' (pen.)	Report	S. García (yellow card) 11'; Pizarro 58'; Bartels 69'; Vestergaard (yellow card) 77'; Junuzović (yellow card) 90+3'; Wiedwald (yellow card) 90+4'	Stadium: WWK ARENA; Attendance: 28,122; Referee: Tobias Stieler

21 November 2015 13	VfL Wolfsburg	6–0	Werder Bremen	Wolfsburg
15:30 CET (UTC+01:00)	Gálvez 11' (o.g.); Kruse 44', 87'; Vieirinha 56'; Guilavogui 67'; Dost 78'	Report	Gálvez (yellow card) 26'; Fritz (yellow card) 43'	Stadium: Volkswagen Arena; Attendance: 30,000; Referee: Peter Sippel

28 November 2015 14	Werder Bremen	1–3	Hamburger SV	Bremen
15:30 CET (UTC+01:00)	Bartels (yellow card) 30'; Lukimya (yellow card) 54'; Ujah 62'	Report	Iličević 3'; Sakai (yellow card) 18'; Gregoritsch 26'; N. Müller 68'	Stadium: Weserstadion; Attendance: 42,100; Referee: Knut Kircher

6 December 2015 15	VfB Stuttgart	1–1	Werder Bremen	Stuttgart
15:30 CET (UTC+01:00)	Die (yellow card) 25'; Rupp 33'; Kostić (yellow card) 49'	Report	Bargfrede (yellow card) 30'; Fritz (yellow card) 53'; Ujah 71'	Stadium: Mercedes-Benz Arena; Attendance: 46,590; Referee: Florian Meyer

12 December 2015 16	Werder Bremen	1–1	1. FC Köln	Bremen
15:30 CET (UTC+01:00)	Vestergaard 4'; Bartels (yellow card) 70'; Öztunalı (yellow card) 70'; Fritz (yellow card) 83'	Report	Vogt (yellow card) 45+1'; Gerhardt (yellow card) 50'; Švento 79'	Stadium: Weserstadion; Attendance: 40,727; Referee: Guido Winkmann

19 December 2015 17	Eintracht Frankfurt	2–1	Werder Bremen	Frankfurt
15:30 CET (UTC+01:00)	Kadlec (yellow card) 10'; Meier 31'; Aigner (yellow card) 42', (goal) 48'; Ignjovski (yellow card) 79'	Report	Fritz (yellow card) 14'; Pizarro 29'; Sternberg (yellow card) 78'; Zetterer (yellow card) 79'; Öztunalı (yellow card) 86'; U. Garcia (yellow card) 87'	Stadium: Commerzbank-Arena; Attendance: 46,000; Referee: Wolfgang Stark

24 January 2016 18	Schalke 04	1–3	Werder Bremen	Gelsenkirchen
17:30 CET (UTC+01:00)	Matip 4'; Kolašinac (yellow card) 77'	Report	Grillitsch (yellow card) 35'; Fritz 43'; Pizarro 53', (yellow card) 80'; Junuzović (yellow card) 58'; Ujah 89'	Stadium: Veltins-Arena; Attendance: 62,271; Referee: Christian Dingert

30 January 2016 19	Werder Bremen	3–3	Hertha BSC	Bremen
15:30 CET (UTC+01:00)	S. García (yellow card) 40'; Fritz (yellow card) 48'; Djilobodji (yellow card) 53'; Bartels 67'; Pizarro 75' (pen.), 77'	Report	Haraguchi (yellow card) 9'; Darida 29'; Plattenhardt 41'; Skjelbred (yellow card) 46'; Weiser (yellow card) 68'; Kalou 71'	Stadium: Weserstadion; Attendance: 40,141; Referee: Bastian Dankert

5 February 2016 20	Borussia Mönchengladbach	5–1	Werder Bremen	Mönchengladbach
20:30 CET (UTC+01:00)	Stindl 12'; Hazard (yellow card) 30'; Christensen 31', 50'; Raffael 70' (pen.); Nordtveit 88'	Report	Pizarro 56' (pen.); Vestergaard (yellow card) 69'; Junuzović (yellow card) 74'	Stadium: Stadion im Borussia-Park; Attendance: 51,569; Referee: Sascha Stegemann

13 February 2016 21	Werder Bremen	1–1	TSG Hoffenheim	Bremen
15:30 CET (UTC+01:00)	Djilobodji 13'; S. García (yellow card) 56'	Report	Kramarić 10', (yellow card) 49' (yellow-red card) 77'; Volland (yellow card) 45'; Schmid (yellow card) 73'; Vargas (yellow card) 90+2'	Stadium: Weserstadion; Attendance: 38,454; Referee: Benjamin Brand

20 February 2016 22	FC Ingolstadt	2–0	Werder Bremen	Ingolstadt
15:30 CET (UTC+01:00)	Hübner 12'; Cohen (yellow card) 22' da Costa (yellow card) 59'; Hinterseer 90' (pen.)	Report	Djilobodji (yellow card) 36'; Pizarro (yellow card) 72'	Stadium: Audi Sportpark; Attendance: 15,000; Referee: Tobias Welz

27 February 2016 23	Werder Bremen	2–2	Darmstadt 98	Bremen
15:30 CET (UTC+01:00)	Ujah 33'; Wiedwald (yellow card) 43'; Yatabaré (yellow card) 45+1'; S. García (yellow card) 47'; Pizarro 89'	Report	Rajković (yellow card) 36'; Wagner 44' (pen.); Sulu (yellow card) 57', (goal) 82'; Niemeyer (yellow card) 71'	Stadium: Weserstadion; Attendance: 40,396; Referee: Robert Hartmann

2 March 2016 24	Bayer Leverkusen	1–4	Werder Bremen	Leverkusen
20:00 CET (UTC+01:00)	Hernández (yellow card) 43'; Djilobodji 69' (o.g.)	Report	Bartels 5'; Pizarro 55', 65' (pen.), 83'; Djilobodji (yellow card) 62'	Stadium: BayArena; Attendance: 25,506; Referee: Marco Fritz

5 March 2016 25	Werder Bremen	4–1	Hannover 96	Bremen
15:30 CET (UTC+01:00)	Bartels 18'; Pizarro 26'; Gebre Selassie 56'; Junuzović 67', (yellow card) 85'; Fritz (yellow card) 69'	Report	Karaman (yellow card) 38', (goal) 45'; Gülselam (yellow card) 40'	Stadium: Weserstadion; Attendance: 42,100; Referee: Felix Zwayer

12 March 2016 26	Bayern Munich	5–0	Werder Bremen	Munich
18:30 CET (UTC+01:00)	Thiago 9', 90'; Müller 31', 65'; Ribéry (yellow card) 35'; Lewandowski 86'	Report	Gebre Selassie (yellow card) 25'; Djilobodji (yellow card) 67'; U. Garcia (yellow card) 83'	Stadium: Allianz Arena; Attendance: 75,000; Referee: Guido Winkmann

19 March 2016 27	Werder Bremen	1–1	Mainz 05	Bremen
15:30 CET (UTC+01:00)	Fritz (yellow card) 38'; Pizarro 45+3' (pen.); Djilobodji (yellow card) 62'	Report	Baumgartlinger 38'; Jairo (yellow card) 61'; Bell (yellow card) 89'	Stadium: Weserstadion; Attendance: 38,416; Referee: Manuel Gräfe

2 April 2016 28	Borussia Dortmund	3–2	Werder Bremen	Dortmund
18:30 CEST (UTC+02:00)	Aubameyang 53'; Kagawa 77'; Ramos 82'; Castro (yellow card) 90+1'	Report	S. García (yellow card) 15'; Yatabaré (yellow card) 50'; Gálvez (yellow card) 53', (goal) 69'; Junuzović 74'	Stadium: Signal Iduna Park; Attendance: 81,359; Referee: Tobias Welz

9 April 2016 29	Werder Bremen	1–2	FC Augsburg	Bremen
15:30 CEST (UTC+02:00)	Grillitsch 43'; Gebre Selassie (yellow card) 68'; Fritz (yellow card) 90'	Report	Caiuby (yellow card) 12'; Opare (yellow card) 50'; Finnbogason 53', (yellow card) 70'; Max (yellow card) 72'; Janker (yellow card) 82'; Hong 87'	Stadium: Weserstadion; Attendance: 41,000; Referee: Daniel Siebert

16 April 2016 30	Werder Bremen	3–2	VfL Wolfsburg	Bremen
15:30 CEST (UTC+02:00)	S. García (yellow card) 26'; Pizarro 32' (pen.); Bartels 64'; Yatabaré 83'	Report	Schürrle (yellow card) 17'; Vieirinha (yellow card) 31'; Guilavogui 36'; Luiz Gustavo (yellow card) 77'; Benaglio (yellow card) 83'; Dost 86'; Arnold (yellow card) 88'	Stadium: Weserstadion; Attendance: 40,557; Referee: Wolfgang Stark

22 April 2016 31	Hamburger SV	2–1	Werder Bremen	Hamburg
20:30 CEST (UTC+02:00)	Lasogga 5', 32', (yellow card) 26'; Gregoritsch (yellow card) 46'; Drobný (yellow card) 79'	Report	Yatabaré (yellow card) 15'; Fritz (yellow card) 35'; Ujah 65'; Djilobodji (yellow card) 76'; Bartels (yellow card) 90+5'	Stadium: Volksparkstadion; Attendance: 57,000; Referee: Manuel Gräfe

2 May 2016 32	Werder Bremen	6–2	VfB Stuttgart	Bremen
20:15 CEST (UTC+02:00)	Bartels 10', 80'; Barba 33' (o.g.); Öztunalı 42'; Pizarro 64'; Ujah 86'; Gebre Selassie (yellow card) 90'	Report	Insúa (yellow card) 9'; Didavi 26'; Barba 53'	Stadium: Weserstadion; Attendance: 41,000; Referee: Felix Brych

7 May 2016 33	1. FC Köln	0–0	Werder Bremen	Cologne
15:30 CEST (UTC+02:00)	Maroh (yellow card) 24'; Hector (yellow card) 51'; Sørensen (yellow card) 61'	Report	Grillitsch (yellow card) 38'; Bartels (yellow card) 79'	Stadium: RheinEnergieSTADION; Attendance: 50,000; Referee: Felix Zwayer

14 May 2016 34	Werder Bremen	1–0	Eintracht Frankfurt	Bremen
15:30 CEST (UTC+02:00)	Grillitsch (yellow card) 50'; Gebre Selassie (yellow card) 78'; Djilobodji 88'; Ujah (yellow card) 89'; Junuzović (yellow card) 90+2'	Report	Oczipka (yellow card) 64'; Russ (yellow card) 90'	Stadium: Weserstadion; Attendance: 42,100; Referee: Deniz Aytekin

=== DFB-Pokal ===
8 August 2015 Round 1	Würzburger Kickers	0–2 (a.e.t.)	Werder Bremen	Würzburg
15:30 CEST (UTC+02:00)	Shapourzadeh (yellow card) 22'; Russ (yellow card) 105'; Fennell (yellow card) 111'	Report	Ujah (yellow card) 79', (goal) 102'; Bargfrede (yellow card) 90'; Bartels 108'; Gálvez (yellow card) 113'	Stadium: flyeralarm Arena; Attendance: 9,706; Referee: Rene Rohde

28 October 2015 Round 2	Werder Bremen	1–0	1. FC Köln	Bremen
20:30 CET (UTC+01:00)	Ujah 23'	Report	Modeste (yellow card) 39'	Stadium: Weserstadion; Attendance: 40,052; Referee: Felix Brych

15 December 2015 Round of 16	Borussia Mönchengladbach	3–4	Werder Bremen	Mönchengladbach
19:15 CET (UTC+01:00)	Stindl 32', (yellow card) 63'; Dahoud (yellow card) 48'; Hrgota 74', 90+3'	Report	Sternberg 51'; Vestergaard 58'; U. Garcia (yellow card) 71'; Pizarro 75'; Ujah 78'	Stadium: Stadion im Borussia-Park; Attendance: 53,106; Referee: Günter Perl

9 February 2016 Quarter-finals	Bayer Leverkusen	1–3	Werder Bremen	Leverkusen
19:00 CET (UTC+01:00)	Hernández 22' (pen.); Wendell (red card) 41'; Çalhanoğlu (yellow card) 52'	Report	Gálvez (yellow card) 21'; S. García 31', (yellow card) 34'; Pizarro 42' (pen.); Grillitsch 82'	Stadium: BayArena; Attendance: 24,104; Referee: Wolfgang Stark

19 April 2016 Semi-finals	Bayern Munich	2–0	Werder Bremen	Munich
20:30 CEST (UTC+02:00)	Müller 30', 71' (pen.)	Report	Fritz (yellow card) 24'	Stadium: Allianz Arena; Attendance: 75,000; Referee: Tobias Stieler

== Squad and statistics ==
Sources: As of 23 January 2016

No.	Pos	Nat	Player	Total		Bundesliga		DFB Pokal	
No.	Pos	Nat	Player	Apps	Goals	Apps	Goals	Apps	Goals
1	GK	(Germany) GER	Felix Wiedwald	20	0	17	0	3	0
2	FW	(Nigeria) NGR	Anthony Ujah	20	10	17	7	3	3
3	DF	(Denmark) DEN	Jannik Vestergaard	19	3	16	2	3	1
4	DF	(Czech Republic) CZE	Theodor Gebre Selassie	19	0	16	0	3	0
5	MF	(Germany) GER	Fin Bartels	18	3	16	2	2	1
6	MF	(Germany) GER	Clemens Fritz	17	0	15	0	2	0
7	MF	(Austria) AUT	Zlatko Junuzović	16	2	14	2	2	0
8	MF	(Germany) GER	Philipp Bargfrede	16	0	13	0	3	0
9	FW	(Peru) PER	Claudio Pizarro	16	3	14	2	2	1
11	DF	(Spain) ESP	Álex Gálvez	15	0	13	0	2	0
14	DF	(Democratic Republic of the Congo) COD	Assani Lukimya	15	0	12	0	3	0
15	DF	(Argentina) ARG	Santiago García	14	0	13	0	1	0
16	MF	(Germany) GER	Levin Öztunali	12	0	10	0	2	0
17	MF	(Austria) AUT	Florian Grillitsch	12	0	9	0	3	0
18	DF	(Switzerland) SUI	Ulisses Garcia	11	0	9	0	2	0
19	DF	(Germany) GER	Janek Sternberg	8	1	5	0	3	1
20	FW	(United States) USA	Aron Jóhannsson	6	2	6	2	0	0
21	MF	(Germany) GER	Maximilian Eggestein	5	0	4	0	1	0
22	FW	(Germany) GER	Melvyn Lorenzen	4	0	4	0	0	0
23	MF	(Germany) GER	Lukas Fröde	3	0	2	0	1	0
25	DF	(Germany) GER	Luca-Milan Zander	2	0	2	0	0	0
26	MF	(Germany) GER	Marcel Hilßner	1	0	1	0	0	0
27	MF	(Germany) GER	Özkan Yildirim	0	0	0	0	0	0
28	MF	(Germany) GER	Felix Kroos	9	0	8	0	1	0
30	MF	(Germany) GER	Julian von Haacke	0	0	0	0	0	0
33	GK	(Germany) GER	Raphael Wolf	0	0	0	0	0	0
35	GK	(Germany) GER	Michael Zetterer	0	0	0	0	0	0
37	DF	(Senegal) SEN	Papy Djilobodji	0	0	0	0	0	0
38	DF	(Croatia) CRO	Mateo Pavlović	0	0	0	0	0	0
39	DF	(Germany) GER	Oliver Hüsing	0	0	0	0	0	0
42	DF	(Germany) GER	Marnon Busch	0	0	0	0	0	0
44	MF	(Hungary) HUN	László Kleinheisler	0	0	0	0	0	0
