= Philipp Bargfrede =

German footballer (born 1989)

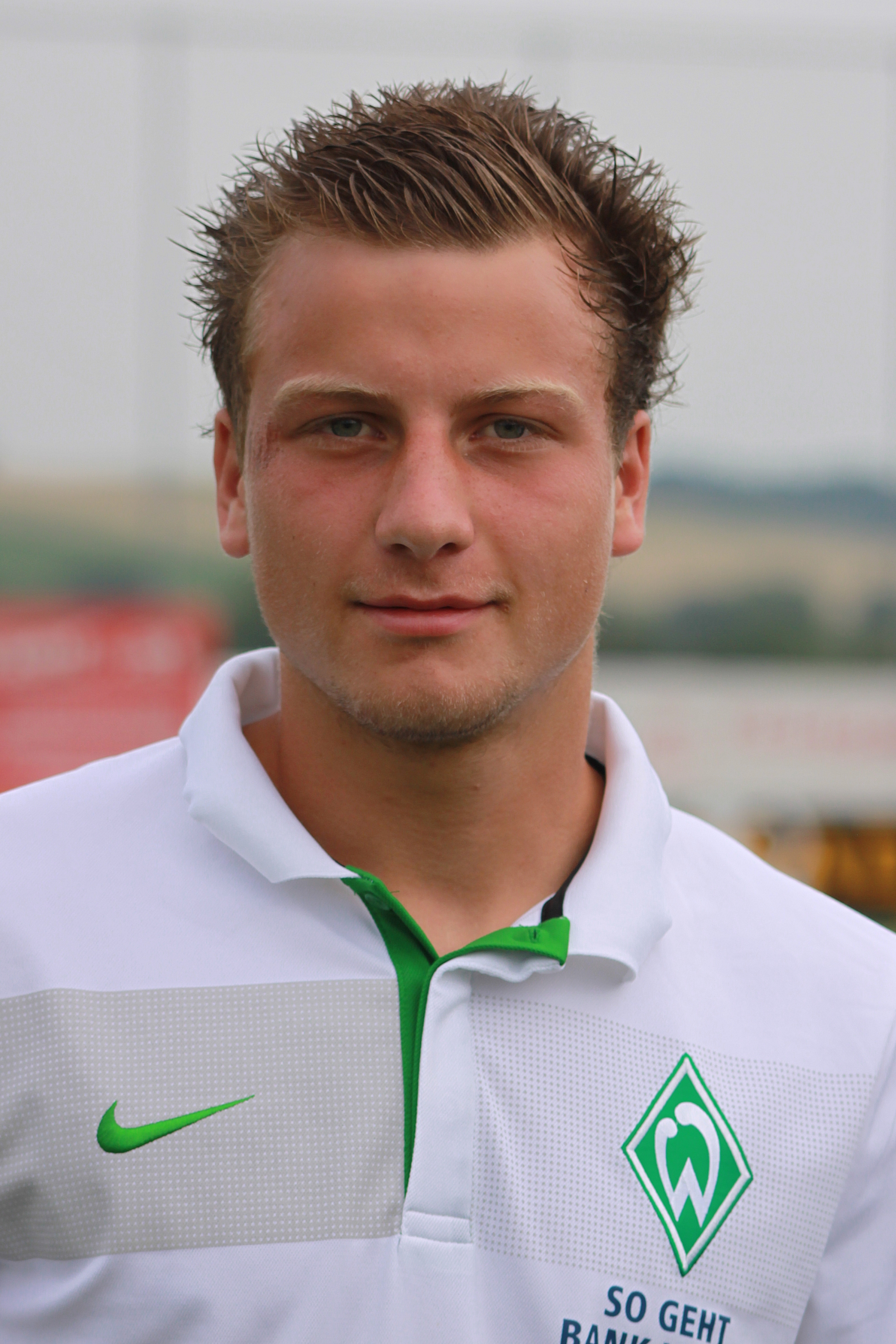
- Bargfrede in 2009

Personal information
- Date of birth: 3 March 1989 (age 37)
- Place of birth: Zeven, West Germany
- Height: 1.74 m (5 ft 9 in)
- Position: Midfielder

Team information
- Current team: Werder Bremen II (player); Werder Bremen (U-17 assistant)
- Number: 44

Youth career
- 1995–2004: TuS Heeslingen
- 2004–2007: Werder Bremen

Senior career*
Years	Team	Apps	(Gls)
2007–2009	Werder Bremen II	19	(1)
2008–2020	Werder Bremen	205	(6)
2020–	Werder Bremen II	36	(6)
2021	Werder Bremen	1	(0)

International career
2009–2010	Germany U21	4	(1)

Managerial career
- 2021–2022: Werder Bremen II (player-assistant)
- 2022–: Werder Bremen (U-17 assistant)
- * Club domestic league appearances and goals as of 19:11, 27 February 2023 (UTC)

Philipp Bargfrede (born 3 March 1989) is a German professional footballer who plays as a midfielder for Werder Bremen II.

== Career ==
=== TuS Heeslingen ===
Bargfrede joined the Heeslingen youth system at the age of 6, in 1995. He stayed with them until 2004.

=== Werder Bremen ===
Bargfrede joined the Werder Bremen youth academy in 2004 and debuted for Werder Bremen II in 2007. On 1 July 2008, Bargfrede was offered a senior team contract. He picked up his first appearance for the senior team on 8 August 2009 in a 2–3 loss to Eintracht Frankfurt. He came on as a substitute in the 74th minute, replacing Tim Borowski. Since then, he has racked up over 150 appearances for the club. In March 2018, Werder Bremen announced that Bargfrede had signed a contract extension which included arrangements to keep him at the club after the end of his playing career.

In August 2020, Bargfrede was released by Werder Bremen after 16 years at the club. He stated his intention of returning to the club in the future in a non-playing role. However, on 24 October 2020, he re-signed for Werder on a one-year deal, joining the reserves. On 24 April 2021, he made his comeback for Werder's first team in the Bundesliga in a 3–1 defeat against Union Berlin.

Alongside his playing career for Werder Bremen's reserve team, Bargfrede was also appointed assistant coach of the team in July 2021. A year later, in June 2022, Bargfrede took on a new role as assistant coach of the club's U17 team, still alongside his playing career.

== Personal life ==
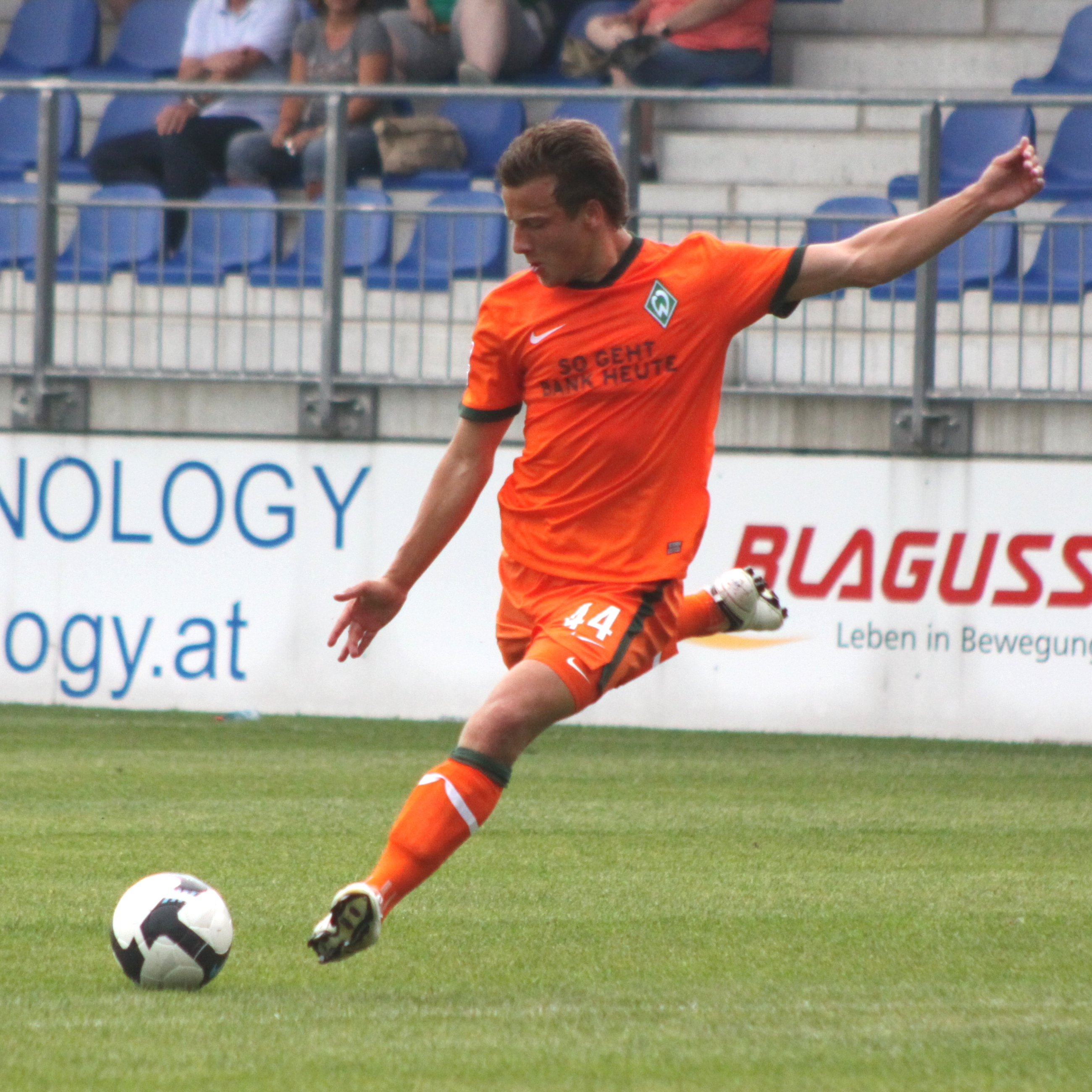
Bargfrede in a match for Werder Bremen in July 2009

His father, Hans-Jürgen Bargfrede, played for FC St. Pauli in the German Bundesliga. His brother, Bent Bargfrede, plays for Heeslingen.

== Career statistics ==
As of match played 13 June 2022

Appearances and goals by club, season and competition
Club	Season	League			DFB-Pokal		Europe		Other		Total	
Club	Season	Division	Apps	Goals	Apps	Goals	Apps	Goals	Apps	Goals	Apps	Goals
Werder Bremen II	2007–08	Regionalliga Nord	4	0	—		—		—		4	0
Werder Bremen II	2008–09	3. Liga	15	1	—		—		—		15	1
Werder Bremen II	2021–22	3. Liga	18	1	—		—		—		18	1
Werder Bremen II	Total		37	2	0	0	0	0	0	0	37	2
Werder Bremen	2009–10	Bundesliga	23	0	5	0	7 (Note: Appearances in UEFA Europa League)	0	—		35	0
Werder Bremen	2010–11	Bundesliga	28	0	2	0	8 (Note: Appearances in UEFA Champions League)	0	—		38	0
Werder Bremen	2011–12	Bundesliga	23	0	1	0	—		—		24	0
Werder Bremen	2012–13	Bundesliga	13	0	1	0	—		—		14	0
Werder Bremen	2013–14	Bundesliga	20	3	0	0	—		—		20	3
Werder Bremen	2014–15	Bundesliga	16	1	0	0	—		—		16	1
Werder Bremen	2015–16	Bundesliga	14	0	3	0	—		—		17	0
Werder Bremen	2016–17	Bundesliga	11	1	0	0	—		—		11	1
Werder Bremen	2017–18	Bundesliga	27	1	3	1	—		—		30	2
Werder Bremen	2018–19	Bundesliga	15	0	2	1	—		—		17	1
Werder Bremen	2019–20	Bundesliga	15	0	1	0	—		1 (Note: Appearances in Bundesliga relegation play-offs)	0	17	0
Werder Bremen	2020–21	Bundesliga	1	0	1	0	—		—		2	0
Werder Bremen	Total		206	6	19	2	15	0	1	0	241	8
Career total			243	8	19	2	15	0	1	0	278	10
