= Volker Ippig =

German footballer and coach

Personal information
- Date of birth: 28 January 1963 (age 63)
- Place of birth: Lensahn, West Germany
- Height: 1.86 m (6 ft 1 in)
- Position: Goalkeeper

Senior career*
Years	Team	Apps	(Gls)
–1981	TSV Lensahn		
1981–1984	FC St. Pauli		
1985–1986	TSV Lensahn		
1986–1992	FC St. Pauli	100	(0)
1992	TSV Lensahn		
Total		100+	(0+)

Managerial career
- 2008: TSV Lensahn
- * Club domestic league appearances and goals

Volker Ippig (born 28 January 1963) is a German former professional footballer who played as a goalkeeper. Ippig spent the entirety of his football career with TSV Lensahn and FC St. Pauli, playing in the Bundesliga with the latter. He is also known for his political views and activism, having been part of the Hafenstraße squatter movement and community projects with the Sandinista National Liberation Front in Nicaragua and became known as "the punk in goal" at St. Pauli.

== Life and career ==
Born in Lensahn, Ippig started his career at TSV Lensahn aged 18 before joining FC St. Pauli in 1981, making his debut for their B-team in September of that year. He made his debut for the first team against TSV Plön in a friendly match and scored an own goal. He left the club during the 1983–84 season, going to work in a school for disabled children in Lensahn, before moving to Nicaragua where he helped construct a health centre with the Sandinista National Liberation Front in San Miguelito. He returned to Germany in 1985 and trained with FC St. Pauli, but spent the 1985–86 season back at TSV Lensahn as they were promoted to the Landesliga. He returned to playing for St. Pauli the following season and combined living in a cabin constructed by himself in Lensahn with life in the Hafenstraße squat. As a result of living in the Hafenstraße squat, which was associated with the club's fanbase, he became an icon for the club's support and became known as "the punk in goal". St Pauli finished third in the 1986–87 2. Bundesliga before being promoted to the Bundesliga in the 1987–88 season. He made 65 appearances across three Bundesliga seasons before the club was relegated at the end of the 1990–91 season. Ippig left St. Pauli in 1992 following an injury to his cervical vertebrae and played for TSV Lensahn in 1992 as a midfielder.

== After football ==
Following his retirement as a player, Ippig completed an apprenticeship as a physiotherapist before working as a goalkeeping coach at St. Pauli, VfR Neumünster, VfB Lübeck and VfL Wolfsburg, and he became manager of TSV Lensahn in 2008. He later took up work as a labourer at the Hamburg docks whilst running a mobile goalkeeping school.

== Personal life ==
His brother Christian is first-team coach and sporting director at TSV Lensahn. His daughter Emma has played for SG GLR Ostholstein.
