= Hans-Jürgen Bargfrede =

German footballer (born 1959)

Personal information
- Date of birth: 10 March 1959 (age 67)
- Place of birth: Zeven, Germany
- Height: 1.70 m (5 ft 7 in)
- Position: Midfielder

Senior career*
Years	Team	Apps	(Gls)
1978–1979	Werder Bremen		
1978–1981	Werder Bremen II		
1981–1990	FC St. Pauli		
1990	Preußen Münster	6	(0)

Managerial career
- 2010–2015: FC St. Pauli youth
- 2015–2018: TuS Heeslingen
- * Club domestic league appearances and goals

Hans-Jürgen Bargfrede (born 10 March 1959) is a German former professional footballer and coach. Bargfrede made 111 appearances as a midfielder for St. Pauli FC between 1981 and 1989 and later became a football coach at TuS Heeslingen.

== Personal life ==
He has three sons who are called Jennings, Bent and Philipp. Philipp is also a professional footballer and has played for Werder Bremen.
