= André Golke =

German footballer

Personal information
- Date of birth: 15 August 1964 (age 62)
- Place of birth: Hamburg, West Germany
- Height: 1.76 m (5 ft 9 in)
- Positions: Attacking midfielder; forward

Youth career
- Hausbruch-Neugrabener Turnerschaft
- Hamburger SV

Senior career*
Years	Team	Apps	(Gls)
–1983	Hamburger SV	0	(0)
1983–1991	FC St. Pauli	205	(49)
1991–1992	1. FC Nürnberg	38	(7)
1992–1993	VfB Stuttgart	25	(1)
1993–1995	1. FC Nürnberg	62	(11)
1995–1998	VfB Lübeck	63	(4)
Total		393	(72)

Managerial career
- 1997–1998: VfB Lübeck
- * Club domestic league appearances and goals

André Golke (born 15 August 1964) is a German former professional footballer who played as an attacking midfielder or forward.

== Honours ==
VfB Stuttgart

- DFL-Supercup: 1992
