= Jürgen Gronau =

German footballer

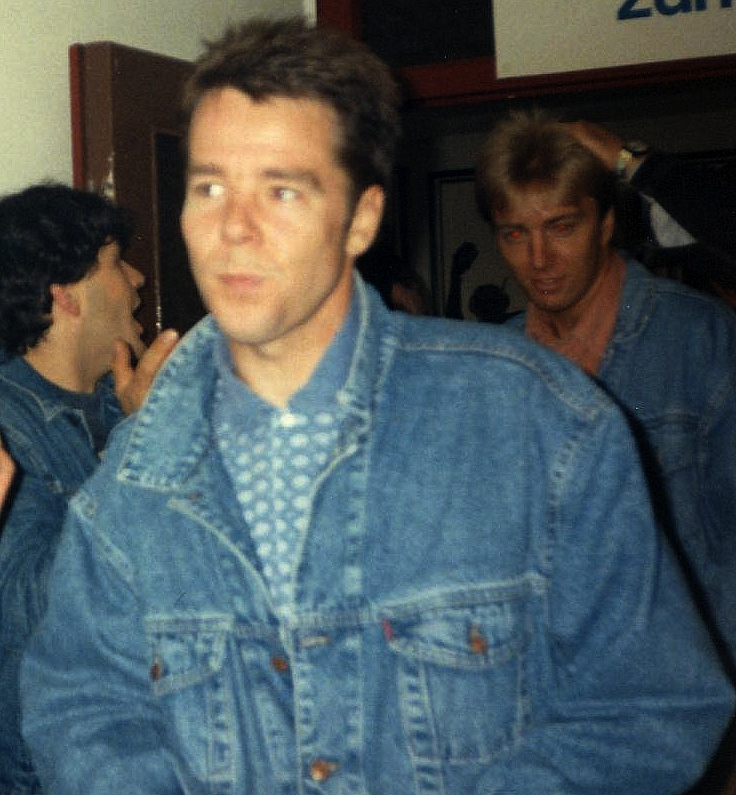
- Gronau in the 1992–93 season

Personal information
- Date of birth: 25 August 1962 (age 64)
- Place of birth: Hamburg, West Germany
- Height: 1.83 m (6 ft 0 in)
- Position: Midfielder

Youth career
- FC St. Pauli

Senior career*
Years	Team	Apps	(Gls)
1984–1997	FC St. Pauli	318	(18)
- * Club domestic league appearances and goals

Jürgen Gronau (born 25 August 1962) is a German former professional footballer who played as a midfielder.
