= Helmut Schulte =

German football coach and manager (born 1957)

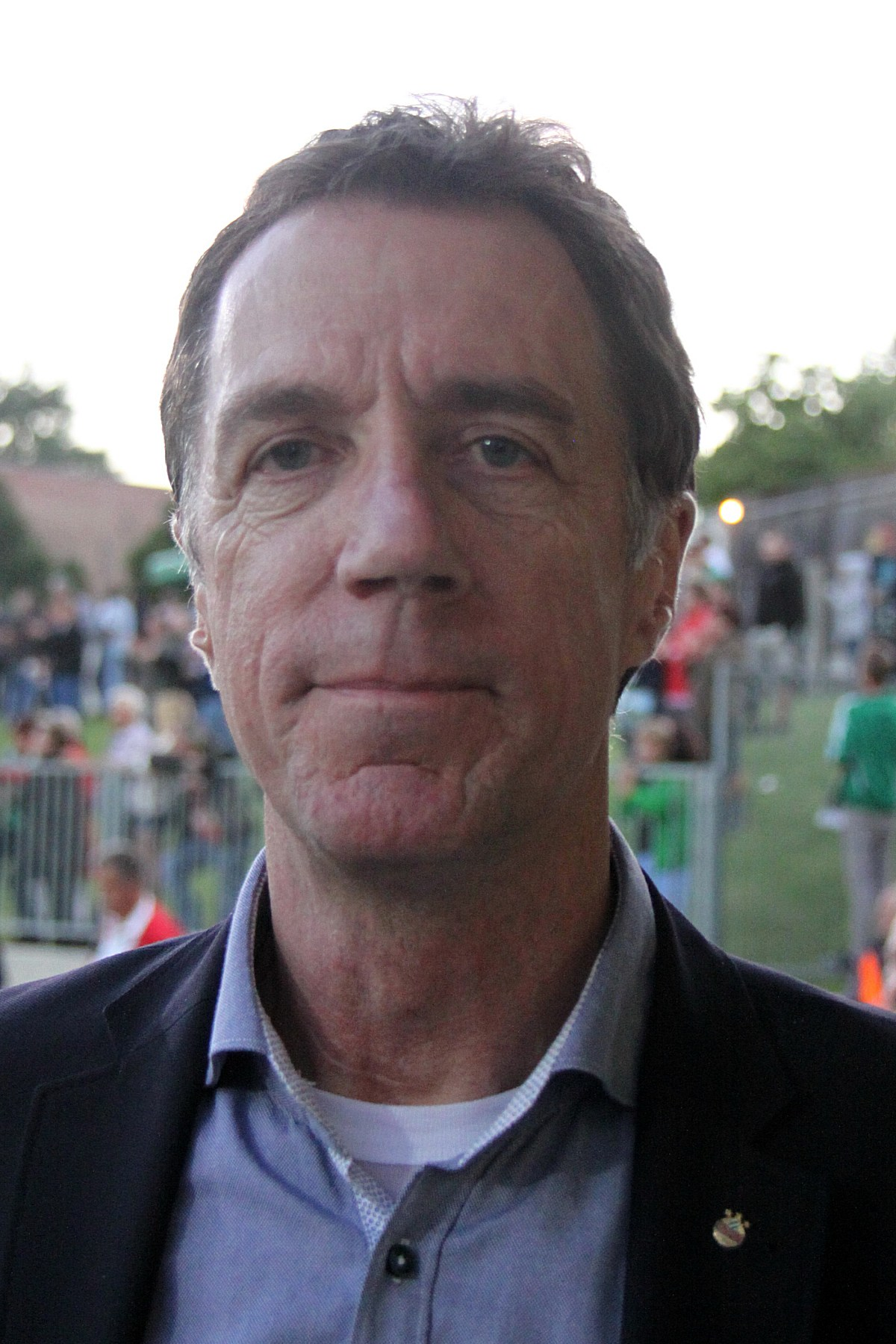

Personal information
- Date of birth: 14 September 1957 (age 69)

Team information
- Current team: FC St. Pauli (athletic director)

Managerial career
- Years: Team
- 1987–1991: FC St. Pauli
- 1991–1992: Dynamo Dresden
- 1993: FC Schalke 04
- 1994–2008: FC Schalke 04 (youth team athletic director)
- 2008–2012: FC St. Pauli (athletic director)
- 2013: SK Rapid Wien (sporting director)
- 2014–2015: Fortuna Düsseldorf (sporting board member)

Helmut Schulte (born 14 September 1957) is a German football coach and manager.

== Coaching career ==
His best result as a coach in Bundesliga is 10th place in 1989 and 1993.
