= TuS Heeslingen =

German football club

- Full name: Turn- und Sportverein Heeslingen e.V.
- Founded: 1906
- Ground: Waldstadion
- Capacity: 1,000
- League: defunct
| Home colours | Away colours |

TuS Heeslingen was a German association football club from the town of Heeslingen, Lower Saxony. The footballers were part of a larger sports club that had departments for aerobics, athletics, badminton, bowling, gymnastics, Pilates, table tennis, and volleyball.

== History ==
The roots of the association go back to the 1906 founding of MTV Heeslingen. On 2 February 1946 this club merged with Sportverein Viktoria Heeslingen to form present-day Turn- und Sportverein Heeslingen. The team played as an unheralded local side before breaking into the Verbandsliga Ost Niedesachsen (V) in 1994. The 2006–07 season was one of the most successful for the club as they won promotion to the Oberliga Nord (IV).

The club last played in the tier five Niedersachsen-Liga where it finished fourth in 2012–13 but was refused a licence for the following season and folded. Its place was taken up by a new club, the Heeslinger SC.

== Honours ==
The club's honours:

- Verbandsliga Niedersachsen-Ost
  - Champions: 2007
