= 2012–13 Hamburger SV season =

Hamburger SV
2012–13 season
- Chairman: Carl-Edgar Jarchow
- Manager: Thorsten Fink
- Stadium: Imtech Arena
- Bundesliga: 7th
- DFB-Pokal: Round 1
- Top goalscorer: Artjoms Rudņevs; Son Heung-min (12 each)
- Highest home attendance: 57,000 (Three times)
- Lowest home attendance: 50,123 vs. Nürnberg, 25 August 2012
- Average home league attendance: 54,266
Home colours	Away colours	Third colours

The 2012–13 Hamburger SV season was the 125th season in the club's football history. In 2012–13 the club played in the Bundesliga, the top tier of German football. It was the club's 50th season in this league, being the only club to have played every season in the Bundesliga since its introduction in 1963.

The club finished seventh in the Bundesliga and also took part in the 2012–13 edition of the DFB-Pokal, the German Cup, where it was knocked out in the first round by third division side Karlsruher SC.

== Review and events ==
At the end of the summer transfer deadline, former HSV player Rafael van der Vaart was signed. He was given the captain wristband in the second half of the season due to a weak performance of the team.

== Friendly matches ==
=== Pre-season ===
6 July 2012 Friendly	TSV 1860 Rosenheim	1–1	Hamburger SV	Rosenheim
	Pflügler 1'	Report (in German)	Sala 52'	Stadium: TSV-Stadion; Attendance: 2,000; Referee: Florian Kornblum (TSV Chieming)

8 July 2012 Friendly	Zillertal-Selection	0–10	Hamburger SV	Hippach
		Report (in German)	Tesche 22', 43'; Berg 25'; Beister 55', 89'; Chrisantus 60'; Arslan 63', 83'; Rudņevs 75', 80'	Attendance: 2,000

10 July 2012 Friendly	Terek Grozny	2–2	Hamburger SV	Mittersill
18:30 CEST	Lebedenko 42'; Georgiev 49'	Report (in German)	Berg 12'; Arslan 23'	Stadium: Waldstadion; Attendance: 800; Referee: Manfred Knapp
Note: After 71 minutes of play, the game was cancelled due to unsafe weather conditions.

14 July 2012 Holstein Kiel; 100th German; Championship; Anniversary	Holstein Kiel	1–1	Hamburger SV	Kiel
17:30 CEST	Gebers 81'	Report (in German)	Beister 33'	Stadium: Holstein-Stadion; Attendance: 6,085

24 July 2012 Hamburger SV; 125th Anniversary	Hamburger SV	1–2	Barcelona	Hamburg
18:00 CEST	Arslan 20'	Report	Alves 5'; Deulofeu 38'	Stadium: Imtech Arena; Attendance: 57,274; Referee: Peter Gagelmann

27 July 2012 Friendly	Eintracht Norderstedt	0–6	Hamburger SV	Norderstedt
		Report (in German)	Beister 8'; Tesche 22'; Rudņevs 63'; Son 75'; Sala 80'; Arslan 89'	Stadium: Edmund-Plambeck-Stadion; Attendance: 2,000

8 August 2012 Friendly	Hamburger SV	0–0 (3 – 2 p)	Nordsjælland	Flensburg
18:45 CEST		Report (in German)		Stadium: Stadion Flensburg-Müwik; Attendance: 2,100; Referee: Norbert Grudzinski
	Penalties
	Beister (penalty scored); Iličević (penalty missed); Tesche (penalty scored); Steinmann (penalty scored)		(penalty missed) Laudrup; (penalty scored) Henriksen; (penalty missed) Gundelach; (penalty scored) Marcondes; (penalty missed) Petry

11 August 2012 Palma City cup	Mallorca	0–1	Hamburger SV	Palma
20:00 CEST		Report	Berg 34'	Stadium: Iberostar Stadium; Attendance: 8,053; Referee: Pedro Sureda

14 August 2012 Friendly	Altona 93	3–5	Hamburger SV	Hamburg
20:00 CEST	Akgül 16'; Winkel 19'; Jaoudat 80'	Report	Son 33', 70'; Jansen 52'; Arslan 53'; Brügmann 80'	Stadium: Adolf-Jäger-Kampfbahn; Attendance: 8,053; Referee: Sven Ehlert

=== Peace Cup ===
20 July 2012 Semi-final	Hamburger SV	2–1	Groningen	Suwon
19:30 KST	Aogo 15' (pen.); Iličević 80'	Report (in German)	Schet 28'	Stadium: Suwon World Cup Stadium; Attendance: 2,000; Referee: Kim Sang-Woo

22 July 2012 Final	Seongnam Ilhwa Chunma	0–1	Hamburger SV	Suwon
19:30 KST		Report (in German)	Berg 81'	Stadium: Suwon World Cup Stadium; Attendance: 20,000; Referee: Vo Minh Tri

=== LIGA total! Cup ===
4 August 2012 Semifinals	Hamburger SV	0–1	Borussia Dortmund	Hamburg
16:45 CEST		Report (in German)	Błaszczykowski 42'	Stadium: Imtech Arena; Attendance: 41,000; Referee: Hans-Joachim Osmers

5 August 2012 3rd Place; Match	Hamburger SV	0–1	Bayern Munich	Hamburg
16:45 CEST		Report (in German)	Weiser 25'	Stadium: Imtech Arena; Attendance: 45,000; Referee: Siebert (Berlin)

=== Mid-season ===
4 September 2012 Friendly	SC Schwarzenbek	0–12	Hamburger SV	Schwarzenbek
20:00 CEST		Report (in German)	4' Jansen; 6', 25' Diekmeier; 7' Van der Vaart; 19' Lam; 44', 45', 54', 57' Son; 52' Tesche; 74' Brügmann; 84' Arslan	Stadium: Sportanlage Schützenallee; Attendance: 2,500

7 September 2012 Friendly	Niendorfer TSV	2–11	Hamburger SV	Hamburg
20:00 CEST	Scharkowski 70'; Utz 81'	Report (in German)	5', 34', 50' Nafiu; 24', 44', 47' Son; 30' Sternberg; 39', 45' Arslan; 43' Van der Vaart; 45' Tesche	Stadium: Sportplatz Sachsenweg; Attendance: 2,962

3 October 2012 Lech Poznań; 90th Anniversary	Lech Poznań	2–1	Hamburger SV	Poznań
19:00 CEST	Đurđević 73'; Wilk 76'	Report (in German)	31' Berg	Stadium: Stadion Miejski; Attendance: 200

10 October 2012 Friendly	VfL 93	0–6	Hamburger SV	Hamburg
18:30 CEST		Report (in German)	10' Aogo; 23' Farrona-Pulido; 31' Arslan; 38' Rincón; 54', 65' Brügmann	Stadium: Borgweg-Stadion; Attendance: 1,250

13 October 2012 Friendly	Eintracht Elbmarsch	1–8	Hamburger SV	Hamburg
13:00 CEST	Spill 6'	Report (in German)	17' Kačar; 25' Kelbel; 29' Tesche; 44' Aogo; 48' Arslan; 58', 88' Diekmeier; 74' Tesche	Stadium: Sportanlage Drennhausen; Attendance: 2,500

30 October 2012 Friendly	Hamburger SV	6–0	SV Halstenbek-Rellingen	Hamburg
18:00 CEST	Berg 15', 35'; Skjelbred 19'; Sala 63'; Mašek 74', 81'	Report (in German)		Stadium: Trainingground, Imtech Arena; Attendance: 200

8 December 2012 Friendly	Grêmio	2–1	Hamburger SV	Porto Alegre
21:00	Lima 10'; Moreno 87'	Report (in German)	Westermann 68'	Stadium: Grêmio Arena; Attendance: 60,540; Referee: Carlos Amarilla (Paraguay)

8 January 2012 Friendly	Hamburger SV	3–1	Lokomotiv Tashkent	Abu Dhabi
18:00 CET	Rudņevs 50'; Aogo 60'; Berg 80'	Report (in German)	72'	Stadium: Sheikh Zayed Stadium; Attendance: 60,000

9 January 2012 Friendly	Hamburger SV	2–2	Borussia Mönchengladbach	Dubai
	Badelj 13'; Rudņevs 39'	Report (in German)	Daems 27' (pen.); Hrgota 85'	Stadium: The Sevens; Attendance: 300

12 January 2012 Care-Energy Cup	Hamburger SV	2–0	Austria Wien	Hamburg
	Son 59'; Beister 60'	Report (in German)		Stadium: Imtech Arena; Attendance: 14,232; Referee: Malte Dittrich

== Competitions ==
=== Bundesliga ===
==== League table ====
Pos	Team	Pld	W	D	L	GF	GA	GD	Pts	Qualification or relegation
5	SC Freiburg	34	14	9	11	45	40	+5	51	Qualification for the Europa League group stage
6	Eintracht Frankfurt	34	14	9	11	49	46	+3	51	Qualification for the Europa League play-off round
7	Hamburger SV	34	14	6	14	42	53	−11	48	
8	Borussia Mönchengladbach	34	12	11	11	45	49	−4	47	
9	Hannover 96	34	13	6	15	60	62	−2	45	

Source: Bundesliga.de, kicker.de
Rules for classification: 1) points; 2) goal difference; 3) number of goals scored.

==== Results by round ====
Round	1	2	3	4	5	6	7	8	9	10	11	12	13	14	15	16	17	18	19	20	21	22	23	24	25	26	27	28	29	30	31	32	33	34
Ground	H	A	A	H	A	H	A	H	A	H	A	H	A	H	A	H	A	A	H	H	A	H	A	H	A	H	A	H	A	H	A	H	A	H
Result	L	L	L	W	D	W	W	L	W	L	D	W	L	W	D	W	L	D	W	L	W	W	L	D	W	L	L	L	W	W	L	D	W	L
Position	15	15	17	15	14	10	8	10	7	9	10	9	10	8	9	7	10	9	9	9	7	6	6	8	9	11	8	8	8	7	7	7	7	7

Updated to match(es) played on 17 February 2012. Source: Competitive Matches
A = Away; H = Home; W = Win; D = Draw; L = Loss

==== Matches ====
Win Draw Loss

25 August 2012 1	Hamburger SV	0–1	1. FC Nürnberg	Hamburg
15:30 CEST	Westermann (yellow card) 30'; Beister (yellow card) 73'; Jansen (yellow card) 80'; Tesche (yellow card) 82'	Report (in German)	Balitsch 68'; Pinola (yellow card) 71'; Balitsch (yellow card) 75'	Stadium: Imtech Arena; Attendance: 50,123; Referee: Marco Fritz

1 September 2012 2	Werder Bremen	2–0	Hamburger SV	Bremen
15:30 CEST	Hunt 52' (pen.); Petersen 67'	Report (in German)	Tesche (yellow card) 80'	Stadium: Weserstadion; Attendance: 42,100; Referee: Knut Kircher

16 September 2012 3	Eintracht Frankfurt	3–2	Hamburger SV	Frankfurt
17:30 CEST	Inui 13'; Occéan 18'; Aigner 52'	Report (in German)	Westermann 45'; Jiráček (red card) 45+2'; Son 63'; Iličević (yellow card) 90+2'	Stadium: Commerzbank-Arena; Attendance: 51,500; Referee: Wolfgang Stark

22 September 2012 4	Hamburger SV	3–2	Borussia Dortmund	Hamburg
15:30 CEST	Son 2', 59'; Van der Vaart (yellow card) 23'; Badelj (yellow card) 37'; Iličević 55'; Adler (yellow card) 90+2'	Report (in German)	Perišić 46', 60'; Schmelzer (yellow card) 90+3'	Stadium: Imtech Arena; Attendance: 57,000; Referee: Günther Perl

26 September 2012 5	Borussia Mönchengladbach	2–2	Hamburger SV	Mönchengladbach
20:00 CEST	Stranzl 39', (red card) 53'; Xhaka (yellow card) 64'; Domínguez 90', (yellow card) 90+2'	Report (in German)	Van der Vaart 23'; Arslan (yellow card) 35'; Rudņevs 45'	Stadium: Borussia-Park; Attendance: 46,233; Referee: Deniz Aytekin

29 September 2012 6	Hamburger SV	1–0	Hannover 96	Hamburg
15:30 CEST	Iličević (yellow card) 2'; Rudņevs 20'; Arslan (yellow card) 38'; Badelj (yellow card) 63'	Report (in German)	Haggui (yellow card) 47'	Stadium: Imtech Arena; Attendance: 57,000; Referee: Felix Zwayer

6 October 2012 7	Greuther Fürth	0–1	Hamburger SV	Fürth
15:30 CEST	Prib (yellow card) 31'; Nehrig (yellow card) 40'; Sararer (yellow card) 43'; Edu (yellow card) 83'	Report (in German)	Son 17'; Diekmeier (yellow card) 36'; Jansen (yellow card) 73'	Stadium: Trolli Arena; Attendance: 18,000; Referee: Thorsten Kinhöfer

21 October 2012 8	Hamburger SV	0–1	VfB Stuttgart	Hamburg
17:30 CEST		Report (in German)	Ibišević 30', (yellow card) 84'; Holzhauser (yellow card) 58'	Stadium: Imtech Arena; Attendance: 53,121; Referee: Tobias Welz

26 October 2012 9	FC Augsburg	0–2	Hamburger SV	Augsburg
20:30 CEST	Reinhardt (yellow card) 60'	Report (in German)	Son 13', (yellow card) 39'; Arslan (yellow card) 36'; Badelj (yellow card) 52'; Rudņevs 64'	Stadium: SGL arena Attendance: 30,660; Referee: Michael Weiner

3 November 2012 10	Hamburger SV	0–3	Bayern Munich	Hamburg
18:30 CET	Diekmeier (yellow card) 32'; Jansen (yellow card) 41'	Report (in German)	Ribéry (yellow card) 24'; Schweinsteiger 40'; Müller 48'; Kroos 53'; Martínez (yellow card) 69'	Stadium: Imtech Arena; Attendance: 57,000; Referee: Knut Kircher

10 November 2012 11	SC Freiburg	0–0	Hamburger SV	Freiburg
15:30 CET	Caligiuri (yellow card) 26'; Schuster (yellow card) 90+2'	Report (in German)	Scharner (yellow card) 10' (yellow-red card) 35'; Van der Vaart (yellow card) 40'; Badelj (yellow card) 54'; Adler (yellow card) 90+2'	Stadium: Mage Solar Stadion; Attendance: 24,000; Referee: Günter Perl

17 November 2012 12	Hamburger SV	1–0	Mainz 05	Hamburg
15:30 CET	Van der Vaart (yellow card) 22'; Son 63', (yellow card) 90+1'	Report (in German)	Pospěch (yellow card) 25'	Stadium: Imtech Arena; Attendance: 51,345; Referee: Daniel Siebert

23 November 2012 13	Fortuna Düsseldorf	2–0	Hamburger SV	Düsseldorf
20:30 CET	Kruse 45+2'; Reisinger 63'; Rafael (yellow card) 78'; Lambertz (yellow card) 80'	Report (in German)	Mancienne (yellow card) 48'; Beister (yellow card) 52'; Arslan (yellow card) 85'	Stadium: Esprit Arena; Attendance: 54,000; Referee: Peter Gagelmann

27 November 2012 14	Hamburger SV	3–1	Schalke 04	Hamburg
20:00 CET	Arslan (yellow card) 31'; Aogo (yellow card) 40'; Beister 52'; Rudņevs 65'; Badelj 90+2'	Report (in German)	Huntelaar (yellow card) 20', (goal) 80' (pen.)	Stadium: Imtech Arena; Attendance: 52,000; Referee: Manuel Gräfe

2 December 2012 15	VfL Wolfsburg	1–1	Hamburger SV	Wolfsburg
17:30 CET	Naldo (yellow card) 22'; Kjær 68'	Report (in German)	Beister 26'; Rincón (yellow card) 64'; Adler (yellow card) 68'; Westermann (yellow card) 83'	Stadium: Volkswagen Arena; Attendance: 28,121; Referee: Peter Sippel

7 December 2012 16	Hamburger SV	2–0	1899 Hoffenheim	Hamburg
20:30 CET	Rudņevs 27', 74'; Skjelbred (yellow card) 84'	Report (in German)	Volland (yellow card) 46'	Stadium: Imtech Arena; Attendance: 47,000; Referee: Michael Weiner

15 December 2012 17	Bayer Leverkusen	3–0	Hamburger SV	Leverkusen
15:30 CET	Kießling 26', 66'; Schürrle 36'; Hegeler (yellow card) 61'	Report (in German)	Lam (yellow card) 24'; Rudņevs (yellow card) 38'	Stadium: BayArena; Attendance: 29,489; Referee: Deniz Aytekin

20 January 2013 18	1. FC Nürnberg	1–1	Hamburger SV	Nuremberg
15:30 CET	Cohen (yellow card) 47'; Pekhart 75'; Frantz (yellow card) 85'	Report (in German)	Arslan (yellow card) 28'; Jansen (yellow card) 36'; Rudņevs 70'; Diekmeier (yellow card) 85'	Stadium: Frankenstadion; Attendance: 42,601; Referee: Tobias Welz

27 January 2013 19	Hamburger SV	3–2	Werder Bremen	Hamburg
15:30 CET	Son 23'; Aogo 46'; Rudņevs 52', (yellow card) 88'; Adler (yellow card) 90+3'	Report (in German)	Lukimya 9'; Papastathopoulos 54', (yellow card) 81'; Fritz (yellow card) 57' (yellow-red card) 80'; Petersen (yellow card) 83'; Arnautović (yellow card) 90' (yellow-red card) 90+1'	Stadium: Imtech Arena; Attendance: 54,758; Referee: Thorsten Kinhöfer

2 February 2013 20	Hamburger SV	0–2	Eintracht Frankfurt	Hamburg
18:30 CET	Badelj (yellow card) 18'; Rudņevs (yellow card) 71'; Bruma (yellow card) 83'	Report (in German)	Lakić 22', 36'; Matmour (yellow card) 90+1'	Stadium: Imtech Arena; Attendance: 52,523; Referee: Felix Zwayer

9 February 2013 21	Borussia Dortmund	1–4	Hamburger SV	Dortmund
15:30 CET	Lewandowski 17', (red card) 31'; Götze (yellow card) 82'	Report (in German)	Rudņevs 18', 62'; Aogo (yellow card) 22'; Son 26', 89'; Van der Vaart (yellow card) 31'; Bruma (red card) 60'	Stadium: Signal Iduna Park; Attendance: 80,645; Referee: Manuel Gräfe

16 February 2013 22	Hamburger SV	1–0	Borussia Mönchengladbach	Hamburg
15:30 CET	Van der Vaart 24'; Badelj (yellow card) 61'	Report (in German)	Herrmann (yellow card) 74'	Stadium: Imtech Arena; Attendance: 54,558; Referee: Robert Hartmann

23 February 2013 23	Hannover 96	5–1	Hamburger SV	Hannover
15:30 CET	Hoffmann (yellow card) 6'; Diouf 7'; Huszti 39'; Ya Konan 45', 68'; Abdellaoue 85'	Report (in German)	Van der Vaart 13'	Stadium: AWD-Arena; Attendance: 47,806; Referee: Knut Kircher

2 March 2013 24	Hamburger SV	1–1	Greuther Fürth	Hamburg
15:30 CET	Beister 21'; Badelj (yellow card) 48'	Report (in German)	Đurđić 14'; Geis (yellow card) 44'	Stadium: Imtech Arena; Attendance: 47,206; Referee: Daniel Siebert

10 March 2013 25	VfB Stuttgart	0–1	Hamburger SV	Stuttgart
17:30 CET	Niedermeier (yellow card) 64'; Ibišević (yellow card) 85'	Report	Rudņevs 49', (yellow card) 72'	Stadium: Mercedes-Benz Arena; Attendance: 47,100; Referee: Christian Dingert

16 March 2013 26	Hamburger SV	0–1	FC Augsburg	Hamburg
15:30 CET	Bruma (yellow card) 43'; Jansen (yellow card) 62'; Beister (red card) 80'	Report	Callsen-Bracker 7'; Baier (yellow card) 33'; Werner (yellow card) 65'	Stadium: Imtech Arena; Attendance: 52,529; Referee: Tobias Welz

30 March 2013 27	Bayern Munich	9–2	Hamburger SV	Munich
17:30 CET	Shaqiri 5'; Schweinsteiger 19'; Pizzarro 30', 45', 53', 68'; Robben 33', 54'; Ribery 76'	Report	Bruma 81'; Westermann 86'	Stadium: Allianz Arena; Attendance: 71,00; Referee: Guido Winkmann

6 April 2013 28	Hamburger SV	0–1	SC Freiburg	Hamburg
18:30 CEST	Arslan (yellow card) 22'; Son (yellow card) 53'	Report	Schmid 69'	Stadium: Imtech Arena; Attendance: 53,021; Referee: Dr. Felix Brych

13 April 2013 29	Mainz 05	1–2	Hamburger SV	Mainz
15:30 CEST	Parker 86'; Zimling (yellow card) 88'; Ivanschitz (yellow card) 90+3'	Report	Son 61', 81'; Westermann (yellow card) 74'	Stadium: Coface Arena; Attendance: 34,000; Referee: Peter Gagelmann

20 April 2013 30	Hamburger SV	2–1	Fortuna Düsseldorf	Hamburg
15:30 CEST	Van der Vaart 14', 20'; Diekmeier (yellow card) 82'; Jansen (yellow card) 89'	Report	Lambertz (yellow card) 18'; Fink (yellow card) 27'; Schahin 35'; Levels (yellow card) 62'	Stadium: Imtech Arena; Attendance: 57,000; Referee: Robert Hartmann

27 April 2013 31	Schalke 04	4–1	Hamburger SV	Gelsenkirchen
17:30 CEST	Bastos 10', (yellow card) 74'; Huntelaar 21', 58', 66'	Report	Jansen 5'; Mancienne (yellow card) 30'; Arslan (yellow card) 62'; Adler (yellow card) 74'	Stadium: Veltins-Arena; Attendance: 61,673; Referee: Peter Sippel

5 May 2013 32	Hamburger SV	1–1	VfL Wolfsburg	Hamburg
17:30 CEST	Son (yellow card) 20'; Westermann 45'; Rincón (yellow card) 60'; Diekmeier (yellow card) 90'	Report	Vieirinha (yellow card) 31'; Hasebe 65'; Perišić (yellow card) 90+2'	Stadium: Imtech Arena

11 May 2013 33	1899 Hoffenheim	1–4	Hamburger SV	Sinsheim
15:30 CEST	Volland 61'	Report	Son 18'; Aogo 35'; Jiráček 60'; Diekmeier (yellow card) 85'; Rudņevs 88'	Stadium: Rhein-Neckar-Arena; Attendance: 30,150; Referee: Christian Dingert

18 May 2013 34	Hamburger SV	0–1	Bayer Leverkusen	Hamburg
15:30 CEST	Westermann (yellow card) 59'; Badelj (yellow card) 63'; Van der Vaart (yellow card) 75'; Iličević (yellow card) 89'	Report	Toprak (yellow card) 20'; Reinartz (yellow card) 67'; Kießling 90'	Stadium: Imtech Arena; Attendance: 57,000; Referee: Wolfgang Stark

=== DFB-Pokal ===
19 August 2012 1st Round	Karlsruher SC	4–2	Hamburger SV	Karlsruhe
14:30 CEST	Çalhanoğlu (yellow card) 22'; Van der Biezen 31'; Alibaz 58'; Stoll 78'; Soriano 86'	Report	Berg 23'; Beister 45+1'; Bruma (yellow card) 60'	Stadium: Wildparkstadion; Attendance: 16,138; Referee: B. Dankert

== Squad ==
=== Squad and statistics ===
As of 15 December 2012

No.	Pos	Nat	Player	Total		Bundesliga		DFB-Pokal	
No.	Pos	Nat	Player	Apps	Goals	Apps	Goals	Apps	Goals
1	GK	(Czech Republic) CZE	Jaroslav Drobný	0	0	0	0	0	0
2	DF	(Germany) GER	Dennis Diekmeier	16	0	16	0	0	0
3	DF	(England) ENG	Michael Mancienne	17	0	16	0	1	0
4	DF	(Germany) GER	Heiko Westermann	31	2	30	2	1	0
5	DF	(Netherlands) NED	Jeffrey Bruma	10	0	9	0	1	0
6	DF	(Germany) GER	Dennis Aogo	12	0	11	0	1	0
7	MF	(Germany) GER	Marcell Jansen	26	0	25	0	1	0
8	MF	(Venezuela) VEN	Tomás Rincón	7	0	7	0	0	0
10	FW	(Latvia) LAT	Artjoms Rudņevs	31	11	30	11	1	0
11	MF	(Croatia) CRO	Ivo Iličević	7	1	6	1	1	0
12	GK	(Germany) GER	Tom Mickel	0	0	0	0	0	0
13	MF	(Germany) GER	Robert Tesche	4	0	4	0	0	0
14	MF	(Croatia) CRO	Milan Badelj	16	1	16	1	0	0
15	GK	(Germany) GER	René Adler	30	0	29	0	1	0
16	FW	(Sweden) SWE	Marcus Berg	9	1	8	0	1	1
17	MF	(Germany) GER	Zhi-Gin Lam	4	0	3	0	1	0
18	MF	(Turkey) TUR	Tolgay Arslan	14	0	13	0	1	0
19	MF	(Czech Republic) CZE	Petr Jiráček	5	0	5	0	0	0
20	DF	(Austria) AUT	Paul Scharner	4	0	4	0	0	0
21	MF	(Germany) GER	Maximilian Beister	16	3	15	2	1	1
22	MF	(Italy) ITA	Jacopo Sala	7	0	7	0	0	0
23	MF	(Netherlands) NED	Rafael van der Vaart	23	5	23	5	0	0
24	DF	(Serbia) SRB	Slobodan Rajković	0	0	0	0	0	0
25	MF	(Norway) NOR	Per Ciljan Skjelbred	7	0	6	0	1	0
30	GK	(Germany) GER	Sven Neuhaus	0	0	0	0	0	0
33	MF	(Denmark) DEN	Christian Nørgaard	0	0	0	0	0	0
37	DF	(Germany) GER	Janek Sternberg	0	0	0	0	0	0
40	FW	(South Korea) KOR	Son Heung-min	30	11	29	11	1	0
44	MF	(Serbia) SRB	Gojko Kačar	0	0	0	0	0	0

== Transfers ==
=== In ===
No.	Pos.	Nat.	Name	Age	EU	Moving from	Type	Transfer window	Ends	Transfer fee	Source
23	MF	(Netherlands)	Rafael van der Vaart	29	EU	Tottenham Hotspur (England)	Transfer	Summer	2015	€13M	
14	MF	(Croatia)	Milan Badelj	23	EU	Dinamo Zagreb (Croatia)	Transfer	Summer	2015	€4M	
19	MF	(Czech Republic)	Petr Jiráček	26	EU	VfL Wolfsburg	Transfer	Summer	2016	€4M	
10	FW	(Latvia)	Artjoms Rudņevs	24	EU	Lech Poznań (Poland)	Transfer	Summer	2016	€3.5M	
	MF	(Turkey)	Hakan Çalhanoğlu	18	EU	Karlsruher SC	Transfer	Summer	2016	€2.5M	
20	DF	(Austria)	Paul Scharner	32	EU	West Bromwich Albion (England)	Transfer	Summer	2014	Free	
15	GK	(Germany)	René Adler	27	EU	Bayer Leverkusen	Transfer	Summer	2017	Free	
33	MF	(Denmark)	Christian Nørgaard	18	EU	Youth system	Promoted	Summer	2015	N/A	
21	MF	(Germany)	Maximilian Beister	28	EU	Fortuna Düsseldorf	Loan Return	Summer	2016	N/A	
	FW	(Nigeria)	Macauley Chrisantus	21	EU	FSV Frankfurt	Loan Return	Summer	2012	N/A	
	DF	(Germany)	Lennard Sowah	19	EU	Millwall (England)	Loan Return	Summer	2013	N/A	

=== Out ===
No.	Pos.	Nat.	Name	Age	EU	Moving to	Type	Transfer window	Transfer fee	Source
9	FW	(Peru)	Paolo Guerrero	28		Corinthians (Brazil)	Transfer	Summer	€3.5M	
17	MF	(Turkey)	Gökhan Töre	20	EU	Rubin Kazan (Russia)	Transfer	Summer	€3M	
34	DF	(Bosnia and Herzegovina)	Muhamed Bešić	19		Ferencváros (Hungary)	End of Contract	Summer	N/A	
19	DF	(Germany)	Lennard Sowah	19	EU	Youth system	Demoted	Summer	N/A	
	FW	(Nigeria)	Macauley Chrisantus	19		UD Las Palmas (Spain)	End of Contract	Summer	N/A	
36	MF	(Philippines)	Kevin Ingreso	19	EU	Youth system	Demoted	Summer	N/A	
10	FW	(Croatia)	Mladen Petrić	31	EU	Fulham (England)	End of Contract	Summer	N/A	
31	MF	(Hungary)	Dániel Nagy	27	EU	VfL Osnabrück	End of Contract	Summer	N/A	
33	DF	(Czech Republic)	Miroslav Štěpánek	22	EU	Senica (Slovakia)	End of Contract	Summer	N/A	
27	MF	(Germany)	Sören Bertram	21	EU	VfL Bochum	End of Contract	Summer	N/A	
42	MF	(Senegal)	Mickaël Tavares	29		Fulham (England)	End of Contract	Summer	N/A	
14	MF	(Czech Republic)	David Jarolím	33	EU	Evian (France)	End of Contract	Summer	N/A	
18	DF	(Netherlands)	Romeo Castelen	29	EU	Free agent	End of Contract	Summer	N/A	
	MF	(Germany)	Hakan Çalhanoğlu	18	EU	Karlsruher SC	Loan	Summer	N/A	
13	MF	(Germany)	Robert Tesche	25	EU	Fortuna Düsseldorf	Loan	Winter	N/A	

EU = if holds or not a European Union passport; Country: when 2 flags, 1st flag = country that plays for internationally, 2nd flag = country of birth; N = number on jersey; P = Position (for position name, pause mouse pointer on abbreviation); Name = Name on jersey (for more extensive name, pause mouse pointer on name); Age = age on the day of the signing; Moving from = only indicate the club the player was playing before start playing for this club in this season, for the type of the moving see Status column; Moving to = only indicates the club the player is going to play next, for the type of the moving see Status column; Ends = when the player's current contract ends; n/a = Not applicable.

== Kits ==
Home	Home Alternate	Home Alt. 2	Away	Third	Third Alternate

Type	Shirt	Shorts	Socks	First appearance / Info
Home	White	Red	Blue	
Home Alt.	White	Red	White	DFB-Pokal, Round 1, August 19 against Karlsruher SC
Home Alt. 2	White	White	White	Bundesliga, Match 17, December 15 against Leverkusen
Away	Navy	Navy	Navy	
Third	Sky blue	Black	Sky blue	
Third Alt.	Sky blue	White	Sky blue	Bundesliga, Match 11, 10 November against SC Freiburg
