= 2012–13 Fortuna Düsseldorf season =

Fortuna Düsseldorf
2012–13 season
- Sporting Director: Wolf Werner
- Manager: Norbert Meier
- Stadium: Esprit Arena, Düsseldorf, NRW
- Bundesliga: 17th
- DFB-Pokal: Round of 16
Home colours	Away colours	Third colours

The 2012–13 Fortuna Düsseldorf season is the 118th season in the club's football history. In 2012–13 the club plays in the Bundesliga, the top tier of German football. It is the clubs first season back in this league, having been promoted from the 2. Bundesliga in 2012. Fortuna Düsseldorf beat Hertha BSC in the promotion/relegation Playoff to earn a spot in the 2012–13 Bundesliga season. The sports court and the Federal Court of the German Football Association (DFB) confirmed the club's promotion after Hertha BSC appealed the result of the second leg and lost on both accounts.

The club also takes part in the 2012–13 edition of the DFB-Pokal, the German Cup, where it reached the second round and will face fellow Bundesliga side Borussia Mönchengladbach next.

== Review and events ==
Andreas Lambertz will start the season with a two match ban. The ban is for celebrating with a torch in his hand after the second leg of the promotion/relegation playoff when Fortuna defeated Hertha BSC on aggregate. The disciplinary panel of the German Football Association decided that Fortuna must play their first home match with no supporters for the supporters running onto the field during the second leg of the promotion/relegation playoff. The club was also hit with a €100,000 fine. After an appeal, the ban on supporters inside the stadium for the first home match was overturned and are now limited to 25,000 supporters for the first two home matches which includes 5,000 visiting supporters. However, the €100,000 fine was increased to €150,000.

Pre-season training commenced on 28 June 2012.

== Matches ==
=== Legend ===
Win Draw Loss Postponed

=== Bundesliga ===
==== League results and fixtures ====
25 August 2012 1	FC Augsburg	0–2	Fortuna Düsseldorf	Augsburg
15:30		Report	Schahin 68', 79'	Stadium: SGL arena Attendance: 30,401; Referee: Knut Kircher

1 September 2012 2	Fortuna Düsseldorf	0–0	Borussia Mönchengladbach	Düsseldorf
18:30		Report		Stadium: Esprit Arena; Attendance: 29,999; Referee: Thorsten Kinhöfer

15 September 2012 3	VfB Stuttgart	0–0	Fortuna Düsseldorf	Stuttgart
15:30		Report		Stadium: Mercedes-Benz Arena; Attendance: 55,039; Referee: Robert Hartmann

22 September 2012 4	Fortuna Düsseldorf	0–0	SC Freiburg	Düsseldorf
15:30		Report		Stadium: Esprit Arena; Attendance: 26,862; Referee: Bastian Dankert

26 September 2012 5	Greuther Fürth	0–2	Fortuna Düsseldorf	Fürth
20:00		Report	Fink 26'; Ilsø 34'	Stadium: Trolli Arena; Attendance: 16,573; Referee: Tobias Welz (Wiesbaden)

29 September 2012 6	Fortuna Düsseldorf	2–2	Schalke 04	Düsseldorf
20:30	Schahin 47', 77'	Report	Huntelaar 13'; Matip 20'	Stadium: Esprit Arena; Attendance: 54,600; Referee: Peter Gagelmann (Bremen)

6 October 2012 7	Mainz 05	1–0	Fortuna Düsseldorf	Mainz
15:30 CEST (UTC+02:00)	Noveski (yellow card) 23', (goal) 85'; Díaz (yellow card) 43'; Kirchhoff (yellow card) 52'; Baumgartlinger (yellow card) 57'	Report	Fink (yellow card) 22' (yellow-red card) 78'; Schahin (yellow card) 42'; Kruse (yellow card) 45'	Stadium: Coface Arena; Attendance: 31,577; Referee: Deniz Aytekin

20 October 2012 8	Fortuna Düsseldorf	0–5	Bayern Munich	Düsseldorf
15:30	Levels (yellow card) 38'; Lambertz (yellow card) 41'; Van der Bergh (yellow card) 42'	Report (in German)	Mandžukić 28'; Luiz Gustavo 36'; Müller 55', 86'; Dante (yellow card) 67'; Rafinha 87'	Stadium: Esprit Arena; Attendance: 54,000; Referee: Felix Zwayer

27 October 2012 9	Fortuna Düsseldorf	1–4	VfL Wolfsburg	Düsseldorf
15:30	Fink (yellow card) 59' (red card) 77'; Langeneke 71' (pen.); Ilsø (yellow card) 82'	Report (in German)	Dost 50', 64'; Olić 53'; Josué (yellow card) 72'; Diego 78' (pen.)	Stadium: Esprit Arena; Attendance: 45,673; Referee: Tobias Welz

4 November 2012 10	Bayer Leverkusen	3–2	Fortuna Düsseldorf	Leverkusen
15:30	Sam 16'; Schürrle 41'; Rolfes (red card) 65'; Castro 66'	Report (in German)	Rafael 40'; Kruse (yellow card) 85'; Bodzek 86'; Langeneke (yellow card) 90+4'	Stadium: BayArena; Attendance: 27,153; Referee: Felix Brych

10 November 2012 11	Fortuna Düsseldorf	1–1	1899 Hoffenheim	Düsseldorf
15:30	Kruse 4'; Levels (yellow card) 77'	Report (in German)	Firmino (yellow card) 33'; Joselu 39'; Compper (yellow card) 47' (yellow-red card) 51'	Stadium: Esprit Arena; Attendance: 41,200; Referee: Robert Hartmann

18 November 2012 12	Werder Bremen	2–1	Fortuna Düsseldorf	Bremen
15:30	Arnautović 33'; Lukimya (yellow card) 36' (yellow-red card) 77'; Petersen 51'; Hunt (yellow card) 78'; De Bruyne 82'	Report (in German)	19' (pen.) Langeneke; (yellow card) 37' Ilsø; (yellow card) 74' Giefer; (yellow card) 75' Lambertz	Stadium: Weserstadion; Attendance: 42,100; Referee: Peter Sippel

23 November 2012 13	Fortuna Düsseldorf	2–0	Hamburger SV	Düsseldorf
20:30 CET (UTC+01:00)	Kruse 45+2'; Reisinger 63'; Rafael (yellow card) 78'; Lambertz (yellow card) 80'	Report (in German)	Mancienne (yellow card) 48'; Beister (yellow card) 52'; Arslan (yellow card) 85'	Stadium: Esprit Arena; Attendance: 54,000; Referee: Peter Gagelmann

27 November 2012 14	Borussia Dortmund	1–1	Fortuna Düsseldorf	Dortmund
20:00	Błaszczykowski 43'; Subotić (yellow card) 65'	Report (in German)	Paurević (yellow card) 75' (yellow-red card) 87'; Reisinger 78'; Kruse (yellow card) 89'	Stadium: Signal Iduna Park; Attendance: 80,100; Referee: Deniz Aytekin (Oberasbach)

30 November 2012 15	Fortuna Düsseldorf	4–0	Eintracht Frankfurt	Düsseldorf
20:30	Reisinger 38'; Fink 42', (yellow card) 56'; Rafael 58'; Balogun (yellow card) 62'; Bellinghausen 85'	Report (in German)	Matmour (yellow card) 27' (yellow-red card) 34'; Meier (yellow card) 70'; Celozzi (yellow card) 73'	Stadium: Esprit Arena; Attendance: 51,345; Referee: Michael Weiner

8 December 2012 16	1. FC Nürnberg	2–0	Fortuna Düsseldorf	Nuremberg
15:30	Nilsson (yellow card) 9'; Polter 27'; Feulner 90'	Report (in German)	Lambertz (yellow card) 14'; Reisinger (yellow card) 26'; Kruse (yellow card) 45'; Bodzek (yellow card) 57'; Balogun (yellow card) 67'; Giefer (yellow card) 86'	Stadium: easyCredit-Stadion; Attendance: 37,041; Referee: Marco Fritz

15 December 2012 17	Fortuna Düsseldorf	2–1	Hannover 96	Düsseldorf
15:30	Fink (yellow card) 28'; Schahin 39'; Bodzek (yellow card) 80'; Ilsø 83'	Report (in German)	Eggimann (yellow card) 64'; Diouf 69', (yellow card) 77'; Pinto (yellow card) 90'	Stadium: Esprit Arena; Attendance: 47,623; Referee: Knut Kircher

20 January 2013 18	Fortuna Düsseldorf	2–3	FC Augsburg	Düsseldorf
17:30	Reisinger 73', 90'	Report (in German)	Baier (yellow card) 12'; Klavan (yellow card) 32'; Mölders (yellow card) 39', (goal) 40', 71'; Koo 45'; Ostrzolek (yellow card) 52'	Stadium: Esprit Arena; Attendance: 40,623; Referee: Manuel Gräfe

26 January 2013 19	Borussia Mönchengladbach	2–1	Fortuna Düsseldorf	Mönchengladbach
15:30	Juanan 6' (o.g.); Herrmann 14'; Marx (yellow card) 39'	Report (in German)	Schahin 50' (pen.)	Stadium: Borussia-Park; Attendance: 50,000; Referee: Peter Gagelmann

2 February 2013 20	Fortuna Düsseldorf	3–1	VfB Stuttgart	Düsseldorf
15:30	Kruse 10', 37', (yellow card) 55'; Malezas (yellow card) 12'; Fink 76'	Report (in German)	Sakai (yellow card) 39'; Gentner 60'; Kvist (yellow card) 66'; Felipe (yellow card) 80'	Stadium: Esprit Arena; Attendance: 44,153; Referee: Wolfgang Stark

10 February 2013 21	SC Freiburg	1–0	Fortuna Düsseldorf	Freiburg
17:30	Schuster (yellow card) 54'; Krmaš 87'	Report (in German)	Balogun (yellow card) 51'; Lanbertz (yellow card) 55'; Bodzek (yellow card) 90'	Stadium: Mage Solar Stadion; Attendance: 21,200; Referee: Jochen Drees

16 February 2013 22	Fortuna Düsseldorf	1–0	Greuther Fürth	Düsseldorf
15:30	Bellinghausen 18'; Fink (yellow card) 49'; Robert Tesche (yellow card) 56'	Report (in German)	Varga (yellow card) 12' (yellow-red card) 38'; Mavraj (yellow card) 62'; Nehrig (yellow card) 71'	Stadium: Esprit Arena; Attendance: 37,378; Referee: Tobias Welz

23 February 2013 23	Schalke 04	2–1	Fortuna Düsseldorf	Gelsenkirchen
18:30	Matip 29', 81'; Jones (yellow card) 41'	Report (in German)	Bodzek (yellow card) 20'; Bellinghausen 56'; Giefer (yellow card) 90'	Stadium: Veltins-Arena; Attendance: 61,673; Referee: Michael Weiner

3 March 2013 24	Fortuna Düsseldorf	1–1	Mainz 05	Düsseldorf
17:30	Svensson 6' (o.g.); Latka (yellow card) 20'; Lambertz (yellow card) 82'; Rafael (yellow card) 88'	Report (in German)	Zabavník (yellow card) 15'; Klasnić 40'; N. Müller (yellow card) 71'	Stadium: Esprit Arena; Attendance: 40,226; Referee: Felix Brych

9 March 2013 25	Bayern Munich	3–2	Fortuna Düsseldorf	Munich
15:30	Müller 45'; Luiz Gustavo (yellow card) 58'; Ribéry 73'; Boateng 86'	Report (in German)	Bolly 16'; Latka (yellow card) 38'; Lambertz 71'	Stadium: Allianz Arena; Attendance: 71,000; Referee: Tobias Stieler

15 March 2013 26	VfL Wolfsburg	1–1	Fortuna Düsseldorf	Wolfsburg
20:30	Josué (yellow card) 17'; Olić 51'; Orozco (yellow card) 84'	Report (in German)	Bolly 37'; Malezas (yellow card) 82'; Tesche (yellow card) 88'	Stadium: Volkswagen Arena; Attendance: 24,540; Referee: Christian Dingert

30 March 2013 27	Fortuna Düsseldorf	1–4	Bayer Leverkusen	Düsseldorf
15:30	Balogun (yellow card) 22'; Lambertz (yellow card) 39'; Schwabb 41' (o.g.); Malezas (yellow card) 82'	Report (in German)	Castro (yellow card) 20'; Kießling 22' (pen.), 88'; Reinartz (yellow card) 38'; Schürrle 62', 84'	Stadium: Esprit Arena; Attendance: 53,265; Referee: Felix Zwayer

5 April 2013 28	1899 Hoffenheim	3–0	Fortuna Düsseldorf	Sinsheim
20:30	Firmino 11'; Lambertz 75' (o.g.); Volland 90+4'	Report		Stadium: Rhein-Neckar-Arena; Attendance: 28,000; Referee: Wolfgang Stark

13 April 2013 29	Fortuna Düsseldorf	2–2	Werder Bremen	Düsseldorf
15:30	Reisinger 2', 48'	Report	Junuzović 16'; Latka 70'	Stadium: Düsseldorf Arena; Attendance: 54,000; Referee: Tobias Welz

20 April 2013 30	Hamburger SV	2–1	Fortuna Düsseldorf	Hamburg
15:30	van der Vaart 14', 20'	Report	Schahin 35'	Stadium: Volksparkstadion; Attendance: 57,000; Referee: Robert Hartmann

27 April 2013 31	Fortuna Düsseldorf	1–2	Borussia Dortmund	Düsseldorf
18:30	Bodzek 88'	Report	Şahin 20'; Błaszczykowski 70'	Stadium: Düsseldorf Arena; Attendance: 54,000; Referee: Michael Weiner (Ottenstein)

4 May 2013 32	Eintracht Frankfurt	3–1	Fortuna Düsseldorf	Frankfurt
15:30	Meier 30', 87'; Lakić 50'	Report	Schahin 78'	Stadium: Waldstadion; Attendance: 51,500; Referee: Peter Sippel

11 May 2013 33	Fortuna Düsseldorf	1–2	1. FC Nürnberg	Düsseldorf
15:30	Balitsch 23' (o.g.)	Report	Mak 58'; Plattenhardt 64'	Stadium: Düsseldorf Arena; Attendance: 53,500; Referee: Knut Kircher

18 May 2013 34	Hannover 96	3–0	Fortuna Düsseldorf	Hanover
15:30	Diouf 36'; Ya Konan 61', 76'	Report		Stadium: Niedersachsenstadion; Attendance: 49,000; Referee: Peter Gagelmann

==== League table ====
Pos	Team	Pld	W	D	L	GF	GA	GD	Pts	Qualification or relegation
14	Werder Bremen	34	8	10	16	50	66	−16	34	
15	FC Augsburg	34	8	9	17	33	51	−18	33	
16	1899 Hoffenheim (O)	34	8	7	19	42	67	−25	31	Qualification for the relegation play-offs
17	Fortuna Düsseldorf (R)	34	7	9	18	39	57	−18	30	Relegation to 2. Bundesliga
18	Greuther Fürth (R)	34	4	9	21	26	60	−34	21	Relegation to 2. Bundesliga

Source: Bundesliga.de, kicker.de
Rules for classification: 1) points; 2) goal difference; 3) number of goals scored.
(O) Play-off winners; (R) Relegated

===== League summary table =====
Overall								Home						Away					
Pld	W	D	L	GF	GA	GD	Pts	W	D	L	GF	GA	GD	W	D	L	GF	GA	GD
15	4	6	5	18	19	−1	18	2	4	2	10	12	−2	2	2	3	8	7	+1

Last updated: 1 December 2012.
Source: kicker.de

=== DFB-Pokal ===
19 August 2012 1st Round	Wacker Burghausen	0–1	Fortuna Düsseldorf	Burghausen
18:30	Holz (yellow card) 55'; Leberfinger (yellow card) 70'; Kulabas (yellow card) 86'	Report	(yellow card) 55' Levels; 76' Reisinger; (yellow card) 67' Langeneke; (yellow card) 89' Kruse	Stadium: Wacker-Arena; Attendance: 4,000; Referee: Harm Osmers

31 October 2012 2nd Round	Fortuna Düsseldorf	1–0 (a.e.t.)	Borussia Mönchengladbach	Düsseldorf
20:30	Rafael 97'	Report		Stadium: Esprit Arena; Attendance: 52,500; Referee: Knut Kirchner

18 December 2012 Round of 16	Kickers Offenbach	2–0	Fortuna Düsseldorf	Offenbach am Main
20:30	Husterer (yellow card) 2'; Kleineheismann (yellow card) 14'; Fetsch 76'; Hahn (yellow card) 82'; Vogler 85'	Report (in German)	Levels (yellow card) 75'	Stadium: Sparda Bank Hessen Stadium; Attendance: 18,400; Referee: Felix Zwayer

== Squad information ==
=== Squad and statistics ===
As of 31 May 2012.

No.	Pos	Nat	Player	Total		Bundesliga		DFB-Pokal	
No.	Pos	Nat	Player	Apps	Goals	Apps	Goals	Apps	Goals
1	GK	(Austria) AUT	Robert Almer	0	0	0	0	0	0
22	GK	(Germany) GER	Michael Ratajczak	0	0	0	0	0	0
33	GK	(Germany) GER	Markus Krauß	0	0	0	0	0	0
2	DF	(Germany) GER	Christian Weber	0	0	0	0	0	0
3	DF	(Spain) ESP	Juanan	0	0	0	0	0	0
6	DF	(Germany) GER	Jens Langeneke	0	0	0	0	0	0
21	DF	(Germany) GER	Johannes van den Bergh	0	0	0	0	0	0
24	DF	(Germany) GER	Jeron Hazaimeh	0	0	0	0	0	0
31	DF	(Germany) GER	Kai Schwertfeger	0	0	0	0	0	0
	DF	(Brazil) BRA	Bruno Soares	0	0	0	0	0	0
7	MF	(Germany) GER	Oliver Fink	0	0	0	0	0	0
8	MF	(Germany) GER	Sascha Dum	0	0	0	0	0	0
13	MF	(Poland) POL	Adam Bodzek	0	0	0	0	0	0
17	MF	(Germany) GER	Andreas Lambertz	0	0	0	0	0	0
25	MF	(Turkey) TUR	Tugrul Erat	0	0	0	0	0	0
26	MF	(Germany) GER	Jules Schwadorf	0	0	0	0	0	0
9	FW	(Germany) GER	Ranisav Jovanović	0	0	0	0	0	0
11	FW	(Denmark) DEN	Ken Ilsø	0	0	0	0	0	0
16	FW	(United States) USA	Villyan Bijev	0	0	0	0	0	0
23	FW	(Australia) AUS	Robbie Kruse	0	0	0	0	0	0

=== Transfers ===
==== In ====
No.	Pos.	Nat.	Name	Age	EU	Moving from	Type	Transfer window	Ends	Transfer fee	Source
	DF	(Brazil)	Bruno Soares		Non-EU	MSV Duisburg	Free	Summer	2015	Free	

==== Out ====
No.	Pos.	Nat.	Name	Age	EU	Moving to	Type	Transfer window	Transfer fee	Source
11	MF	(Germany)	Maximilian Beister	21	EU	Hamburger SV	End of loan	Summer	Free	
5	DF	(Republic of the Congo)	Assani Lukimya-Mulongoti	26	Non-EU	Werder Bremen		Summer		
18	FW	(Germany)	Thomas Bröker	27	EU	1. FC Köln		Summer		
19	DF	(Germany)	Tobias Levels	25	EU	Borussia Mönchengladbach	End of loan	Summer	Free	
30	FW	(Germany)	Sascha Rösler	34	EU	Alemannia Aachen	End of contract	Summer	Free	
