= 2011–12 Fortuna Düsseldorf season =

Fortuna Düsseldorf
2011–12 season
- Manager: Norbert Meier
- 2. Bundesliga: 3rd Promotion playoff winner
- DFB-Pokal: 3rd Round
- Top goalscorer: League: Sascha Rösler (11); All: Sascha Rösler (14)
- Highest home attendance: 33.150 (v. VfL Bochum)
- Lowest home attendance: 21.240 (v. FC Ingolstadt)
Home colours	Away colours	Third colours

The 2011–12 season was the 117th season in the history of Fortuna Düsseldorf. The season started on 18 July against VfL Bochum.

== Review and events ==
=== Overview of season ===
Fortuna Düsseldorf became the most successful Herbstmeister ("Autumn champion") in 2. Bundesliga history after earning 41 points from 17 matches. The 41 points accumulated is the most in history since the three-point system was introduced in 1995. Düsseldorf lost their first six matches in 2010–11 season. since then, they've earned 94 points which is most out of all professional football clubs in Germany.

=== Hertha BSC vs. Fortuna Düsseldorf ===
==== The matches ====
Fortuna Düsseldorf won a spot in the promotion/relegation playoff against the Bundesliga's Hertha BSC.

===== First leg =====
Entering the playoff, Fortuna Düsseldorf had not played in the top flight for 15 seasons. They won the first leg against Hertha BSC 1–2 in Berlin's Olympic Stadium with goals from Thomas Bröker and an own goal from Hertha's Adrián Ramos.

===== Second leg =====
In the return leg in Düsseldorf, both teams drew 2–2; Fortuna Düsseldorf won on aggregate 4–3. However, the match's second half was marred by trouble, first after Hertha supports threw flares onto the pitch after Fortuna scored its second goal of the night to go up 2–1. The other problem was when several Fortuna supporters ran onto the field with around one minute remaining in the match. It took 21 minutes to restore order and stoppage time ended up being 28 minutes by the time the final whistle blew. With Fortuna winning the two-legged affair, they secured a return to the Bundesliga after 15 seasons.

==== The appeal ====
Hertha BSC appealed the result of the match. The German Football Association (DFB) met on 18 May 2012 to discuss the incidents of the second leg. Campino, singer for Die Toten Hosen, called Hertha BSC's protest "indecent". The hearing at the DFB lasted for six hours. The panel's decision will not be known until a further meeting on Monday. It is expected to make a decision at 15.00 CET. The German Football Association stated that any possible disciplinary action against either club or any of the players will be taken at a later date. The players being investigated are Levan Kobiashvili, Christian Lell, Thomas Kraft and Andre Mijatović. Second leg referee Wolfgang Stark was a key witness at the first hearing. Fortuna canceled a planned trip to Mallorca due to the hearing on 21 May 2012.

Sports law expert Michael Lehner said that Hertha can hope for replay after the second leg of the promotion/relegation playoff. Lehner went on to state, "Is not the game has been properly placed on the principle of equal opportunity at the end there was a break in terms of game development," and, "The team of Hertha BSC through the fault of third parties a real opportunity has been deprived of the game even. get why there should be a replay from a legal point of view."

The sports court of the DFB ultimately rejected Hertha's appeal, with Hertha ordered to pay the cost of the proceedings. Hertha then appealed the decision of the DFB's sports court. The sports DFB court president Hans Eberhard Lorenz stated, "The appeal was unsuccessful, because no ground of opposition was to prove the referee has traded at any time conform to the rules, and the alleged Hertha BSC-sided weakness due to the interruption could not be proven..." He also stated that, "There was no Berlin players injured or assaulted or were needed to be replaced. Had this been the case, the objection would have been done." The Federal Court of the German Football Association confirmed the Sports Court decision. Hertha can appeal the decision to the Sports Court for Arbitration. After the final verdict, Hertha players went on vacation, while Fortuna players were not immediately released for vacation.

The disciplinary panel of the DFB decided that Fortuna must play their first home match of next season behind closed doors as a result of their fans running onto the field during the second leg of the promotion/relegation playoff. The club was also sanctioned with a six-figure fine.

==== Other incidents ====
Another incident, as reported by Die Welt the next day, was that Hertha players attacked second leg referee Wolfgang Stark. Stark pressed charges against an unknown player for assaulting him off the field. Hertha apologized for the conduct of some of the club's players. The decision on the misconduct of Kobiashvili, Lell, Kraft and Mijatović are due later this week. The four players are accused of verbally and physically harassing the referee. Fortuna's Andreas Lambertz is also being investigated. He celebrated with a torch in his hand after the match.

== Match results ==
=== Legend ===
Win Draw Loss

=== 2. Bundesliga ===
==== Regular season ====
Match	Date	Time^{1}	Venue	Opponent	Result^{2}	Scorers	Attendance	League Position	Ref.
1	18 July 2011	20:15	Home	VfL Bochum	2–0	Rösler 66', Bröker 88'	33,150	2	
2	24 July 2011	15:30	Away	SC Paderborn	1–1	Langeneke 42' (pen.)	11,014	3	
3	5 August 2011	18:00	Home	FC Ingolstadt	4–1	Rösler 43', Bröker 50', 72', Fink 54'	21,240	1	
4	15 August 2011	20:15	Away	Eintracht Frankfurt	1–1	Beister 54'	42,000	6	
5	19 August 2011	18:00	Home	1860 Munich	3–1	Rösler 43' (pen.), Lambertz 46', Beister 67'	28,300	5	
6	27 August 2011	13:00	Away	Alemannia Aachen	0–0	—	23,864	7	
7	10 September 2011	13:00	Home	Karlsruher SC	4–2	Langeneke 12' (pen.), Rösler 20', Bröker 67', 75'	27,230	3	
8	16 September 2011	18:00	Away	Erzgebirge Aue	4–2	Langeneke 14' (pen.), Rösler 22', Lukimya 84', Juanan 89'	10,100	3	
9	24 September 2011	13:00	Home	Energie Cottbus	4–2	Beister 4', 26', Rösler 17', Grimaldi 90'+3'	25,450	2	
10	3 October 2011	20:15	Away	Eintracht Braunschweig	1–1	Langeneke 85' (pen.)	23,050	3	
11	17 October 2011	20:15	Away	FC St. Pauli	3–1	Lambertz 45+1', 57', Beister 75'	24,487	3	
12	21 October 2011	18:00	Home	Hansa Rostock	2–0	Langeneke 27' (pen.), Rösler 54'	23,550	3	
13	30 October 2011	13:30	Away	FSV Frankfurt	5–2	Rösler 16', 55' (pen.), Dum 66', Beister 82', 85'	7,719	1	
14	4 November 2011	18:00	Home	Dynamo Dresden	2–1	Beister 20', Jovanović 90'+2'	32,300	1	
15	19 November 2011	13:30	Away	Union Berlin	0–0	—	18,432	2	
16	28 November 2011	20:15	Home	Greuther Fürth	2–1	Fink 18', Langeneke 39' (pen.)	33,017	1	
17	5 December 2011	20:15	Away	MSV Duisburg	2–0	Langeneke 57' (pen.), Rösler 59'	23,117	1	
18	10 December 2011	13:00	Away	VfL Bochum	1–1	Rösler 74'	17,500	1	
19	16 December 2011	18:00	Home	SC Paderborn	2–3	Juanan 56', Jovanović 75'	25,240	1	
20	4 February 2012	13:00	Away	FC Ingolstadt	1–1	Langeneke 30' (pen.)	6,585	1	
21	13 February 2012	20:15	Home	Eintracht Frankfurt	1–1	Langeneke 90+1' (pen.)	41,213	1	
22	19 February 2012	13:30	Away	1860 Munich	1–2	Beister 44'	21,400	4	
23	27 February 2012	20:15	Home	Alemannia Aachen	0–0	—	28,712	5	
24	3 March 2012	13:00	Away	Karlsruher SC	5–0	Fink 10', Beister 16', Ilsø 49', Rösler 53', Lambertz 76'	16,419	4	
25	10 March 2012	13:00	Home	Erzgebirge Aue	3–1	Beister 22', Ilsø 65', Bröker 72'	30,237	3	
26	19 March 2012	20:15	Away	Energie Cottbus	1–1	Matuszczyk 81'	7,819	3	
27	24 March 2012	13:00	Home	Eintracht Braunschweig	1–1	Bröker 47'	35,427	3	
28	2 April 2012	20:15	Home	FC St. Pauli	0–0	—	47,484	3	
29	5 April 2012	18:00	Away	Hansa Rostock	1–2	Jovanović 85'	14,500	3	
30	10 April 2012	17:30	Home	FSV Frankfurt	1–0	Jovanović 55'	25,107	3	
31	16 April 2012	20:15	Away	Dynamo Dresden	1–2	Bröker 44'	26,367	4	
32	22 April 2012	13:30	Home	Union Berlin	2–1	Ilsø 15', Rösler 22' (pen.)	33,637	3	
33	29 April 2012	13:00	Away	Greuther Fürth	1–1	Ilsø 60'	15,500	3	
34	6 May 2012	13:30	Home	MSV Duisburg	2–2	Fink 18', Lukimya 21'	51,000	3	

- 1.Match times before 30 October and after 24 March are played in Central European Summer Time. Match times from 30 October to 24 March are played in Central European Time.
- 2.Fortuna Düsseldorf goals listed first.

==== Promotion playoff ====
As third-place team, Fortuna Düsseldorf faces the 16th-placed 2011–12 Bundesliga side in a two-legged play-off. Hertha BSC finished in 16th place. The winner on aggregate score after both matches will earn a spot in the 2012–13 Bundesliga.

Dates and times of these matches were determined by the Deutsche Fußball-Liga as following:

10 May 2012
20:30 CEST

Hertha BSC	1–2	Fortuna Düsseldorf

Olympic Stadium, Berlin
15 May 2012
20:30 CEST

Fortuna Düsseldorf	2–2	Hertha BSC

Esprit Arena, Düsseldorf, North Rhine-Westphalia

=== DFB-Pokal ===
31 July First Round	Hessen Kassel	0–3	Fortuna Düsseldorf	Kassel
17:30 CEST		Match Report	25' Bröker; 80' Rösler; 80' Fink	Stadium: Auestadion; Attendance: 14,850; Referee: Benjamin Cortus

25 October Second Round	Fortuna Düsseldorf	3–0	1860 Munich	Düsseldorf
19:00 CEST	Benjamin 15' (o.g.); Rösler 86', 90+1' (pen.)	Match Report		Stadium: Esprit Arena; Attendance: 34,413; Referee: Jochen Drees

20 December Round of 16	Fortuna Düsseldorf	0–0 (4–5 p)	Borussia Dortmund	Düsseldorf
20:30 CET		Report		Stadium: Esprit Arena; Attendance: 54,000; Referee: Manuel Gräfe
	Penalties
	Jovanović (penalty scored); Langeneke (penalty scored); Lambertz (penalty scored); Bröker (penalty missed); Rösler (penalty scored)		(penalty scored) Hummels; (penalty scored) Błaszczykowski; (penalty scored) Kehl; (penalty scored) Gündoğan; (penalty scored) Perišić

== Player information ==
=== Roster and statistics ===
As of 17 December 2011

Squad Season 2011–12 Sources:
Player					2. Bundesliga		DFB-Pokal		Promotion playoff		Totals	
Player	Nat.	Birthday	at Fortuna since	Previous club	Matches	Goals	Matches	Goal	Matches	Goals	Matches	Goals
Goalkeepers
Michael Ratajczak	German	16 April 1982	2007	Rot-Weiss Essen	17	0	2	0			19	0
Robert Almer	Austrian	20 March 1984	2011	Austria Wien	3	0	0	0			3	0
Markus Krauss	German	16 September 1987	2011	VfB Stuttgart	0	0	0	0			0	0
Defenders
Jeron Hazaimeh	German	13 February 1992	2002	SV Wersten	0	0	0	0			0	0
Juanan	Spanish	27 April 1987	2011	Real Madrid Castilla	11	2	1	0			12	2
Jens Langeneke	German	29 March 1977	2006	Rot Weiss Ahlen	19	7	1	0			20	7
Tobias Levels	German	22 November 1986	2011	Borussia Mönchengladbach	12	0	1	0			13	0
Assani Lukimya	Congolese	25 January 1986	2010	Carl Zeiss Jena	19	1	2	0			21	1
Kai Schwertfeger	German	8 September 1988	1997	Mettmanner SC	0	0	0	0			0	0
Johannes van den Bergh	German	21 November 1986	2009	Borussia Mönchengladbach	19	0	2	0			21	0
Christian Weber	German	15 September 1983	2009	AEL	8	0	2	0			10	0
Midfielders
Maximilian Beister	German	6 September 1990	2010	Hamburger SV	19	8	2	0			21	8
Adam Bodzek	Polish	7 September 1985	2011	MSV Duisburg	18	0	2	0			20	0
Sascha Dum	German	3 July 1986	2010	Energie Cottbus	14	1	2	0			16	1
Tugrul Erat	Turkish	17 June 1992	2009	Union Nettetal	12	0	0	0			12	0
Oliver Fink	German	6 June 1982	2009	SpVgg Unterhaching	17	2	2	1			19	3
Andreas Lambertz	German	15 October 1984	2002	VfR Neuss	17	3	2	0			19	3
Jules Schwadorf	German	19 October 1992	2011	Bayer Leverkusen	0	0	0	0			0	0
Forwards
Villyan Bijev	American	3 January 1993	2011	Liverpool	0	0	0	0			0	0
Thomas Bröker	German	22 January 1985	2010	Rot Weiss Ahlen	17	5	2	1			19	6
Timo Furuholm	Finnish	11 October 1987	2012	Inter Turku	2	0	0	0			2	0
Adriano Grimaldi	German	5 April 1991	2011	Mainz 05	7	1	2	0			9	1
Ken Ilsø	Danish	2 December 1986	2011	Midtjylland	13	0	0	0			13	0
Ranisav Jovanović	Serbian	5 November 1980	2008	Mainz 05	5	1	0	0			6	2
Robbie Kruse	Australian	5 October 1988	2011	Melbourne Victory	11	0	1	0			12	0
Sascha Rösler	German	28 October 1977	2010	1860 Munich	18	11	2	3			20	14
