= Robert Tesche =

German footballer (born 1987)

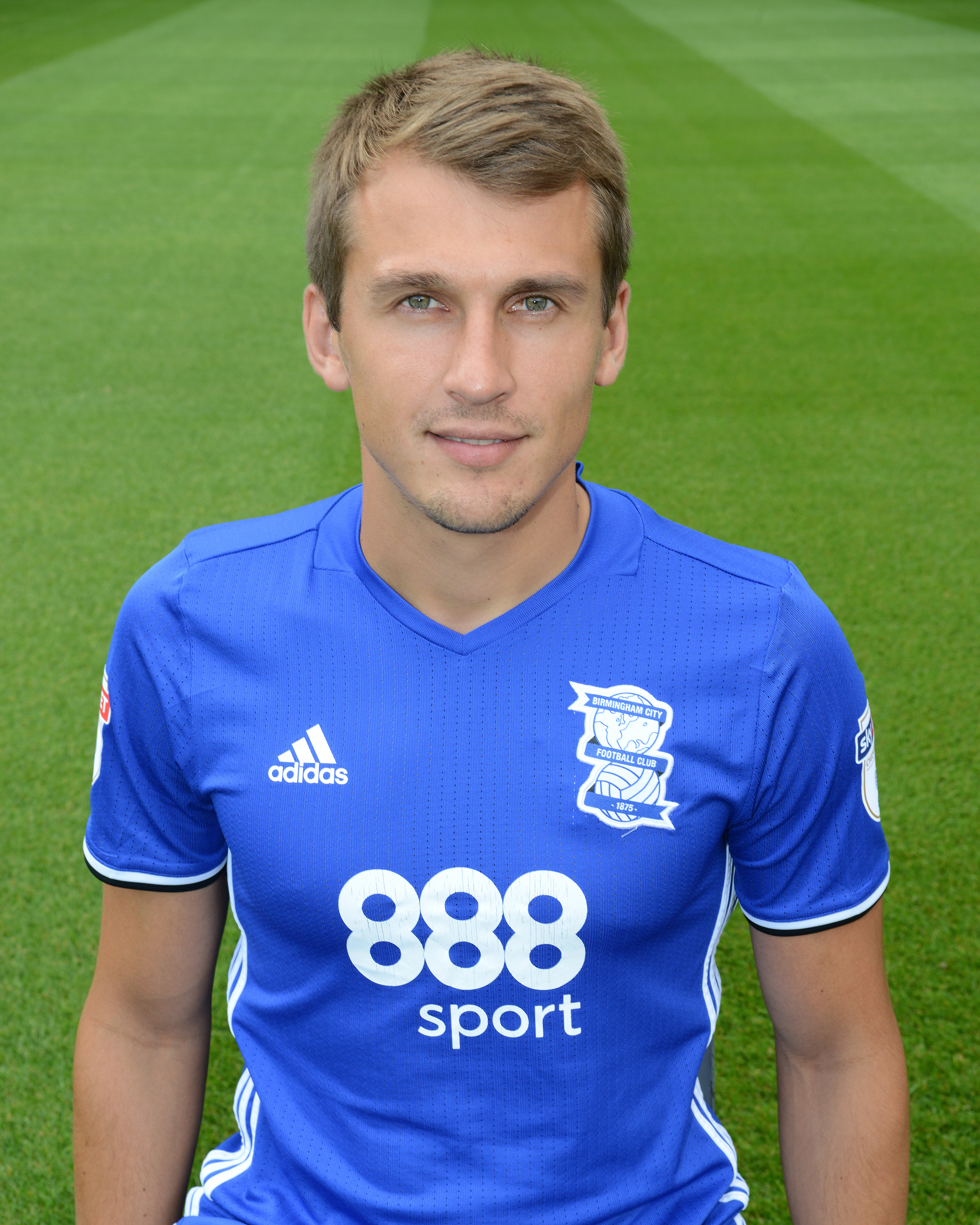
- Tesche with Birmingham City in 2016

Personal information
- Full name: Robert Tesche
- Date of birth: 27 May 1987 (age 39)
- Place of birth: Wismar, East Germany
- Height: 1.82 m (6 ft 0 in)
- Position: Midfielder

Youth career
- 1993–2001: Viktoria Mennighüffen
- 2001–2007: Arminia Bielefeld

Senior career*
Years	Team	Apps	(Gls)
2006–2008	Arminia Bielefeld II	30	(6)
2007–2009	Arminia Bielefeld	48	(3)
2009–2014	Hamburger SV	63	(4)
2009–2014	Hamburger SV II	11	(2)
2013	→ Fortuna Düsseldorf (loan)	14	(0)
2014–2016	Nottingham Forest	46	(3)
2015	→ Birmingham City (loan)	12	(2)
2016–2018	Birmingham City	24	(0)
2017–2018	→ VfL Bochum (loan)	18	(1)
2018–2022	VfL Bochum	100	(12)
2022–2026	VfL Osnabrück	110	(11)
- * Club domestic league appearances and goals

Robert Tesche (born 27 May 1987) is a German former professional footballer who played as a midfielder.

Tesche played for Arminia Bielefeld, Hamburger SV and Fortuna Düsseldorf before moving to England in 2014 to join Nottingham Forest. He spent the latter part of the 2014–15 season on loan at Birmingham City, and signed for that club in 2016 after being released by Forest. After spending the 2017–18 season on loan to VfL Bochum, he signed permanently in July 2018.

== Career ==
=== Arminia Bielefeld ===
Wismar-born Tesche's family moved to Löhne in West Germany in 1993. He began his footballing career for VfL Viktoria Mennighüffen. In 2001–02 he moved to Arminia Bielefeld's youth department, a team he grew up supporting. He was considered as one of the most exciting talents of Arminia, and in 2006–07 he moved up to their reserve team. At some point of his early career at Arminia Bielefeld, he signed a contract with the club, keeping him until 2008.

Under head coach Ernst Middendorp, Tesche made his professional debut on 30 March 2007, where he surprisingly started in the starting-XI before being substituted in the 67th minute, in a 1–0 win over Borussia Dortmund. Between 29 April 2007 and 6 May 2007, he assisted two goals against Werder Bremen and Bayer Leverkusen. At the end of the 2006–07 season, Tesche went on to make seven appearances in all competitions. In May 2007 he signed a contract with Arminia Bielefeld, keeping him in the Westphalian city for three years.

In the 2007–08 season, Tesche continued to feature in the first team for the side and made several starts in number of matches. However, he spent the number of matches on the substitute bench during the season and appeared in the reserve game for the number of matches. On 17 May 2008, the last game of the season, Tesche scored his first goal of the season, in a 2–2 draw against Stuttgart. The draw helped the side avoid relegation in the Bundesliga and retain their status in the top–flight league for another season. At the end of the 2007–08 season, Tesche went on to make seventeen appearances and scoring once in all competitions.

In the 2008–09 season, Tesche started the season well when he set up an opening goal for Artur Wichniarek, in a 2–0 win over ASV Durlach in the first round of the DFB–Pokal, followed up by setting up another goal for Wichnaiarek, in a 2–2 draw against Werder Bremen in the opening game of the season. He began to establish himself in the starting eleven despite facing competition in the midfield position. In a match against Bayern Munich on 1 November 2008, Tesche set up a goal for Wichniarek to score an equaliser, but was later sent–off for a foul on Franck Ribéry, in a 3–1 loss. After serving a three match suspension, he returned to the first team as a substitute on 28 November 2008, in a 3–0 loss. Shortly after his return, Tesche suffered a concussion during a 0–0 draw against Borussia Dortmund on 6 December 2008, but quickly made a recovery. Later in the 2008–09 season, Tesche scored two goals against Borussia Mönchengladbach and Bayer Leverkusen. However, the club ultimately finished last place, as they were relegated to the 2. Bundesliga. At the end of the 2008–09 season, Tesche went on to make twenty–eight appearances and scoring two times in all competitions.

However, in the first days of July 2009, shortly after Arminia Bielefeld relegated to the 2. Bundesliga, Tesche was offered a contract with Hamburger SV. In accordance with the board, he was allowed to move to Hamburger SV.

=== Hamburger SV ===
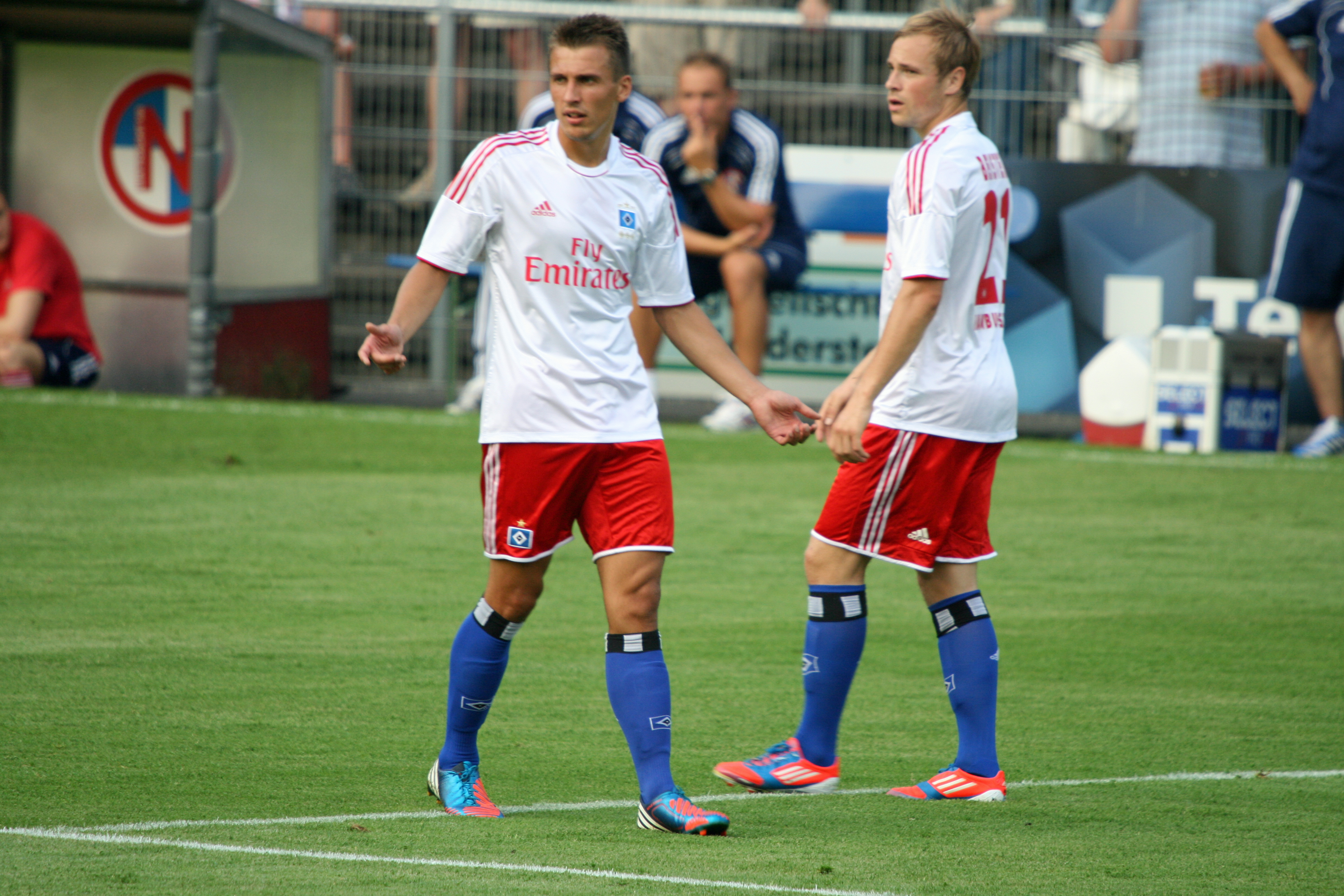
Tesche playing alongside Maximilian Beister in 2012.

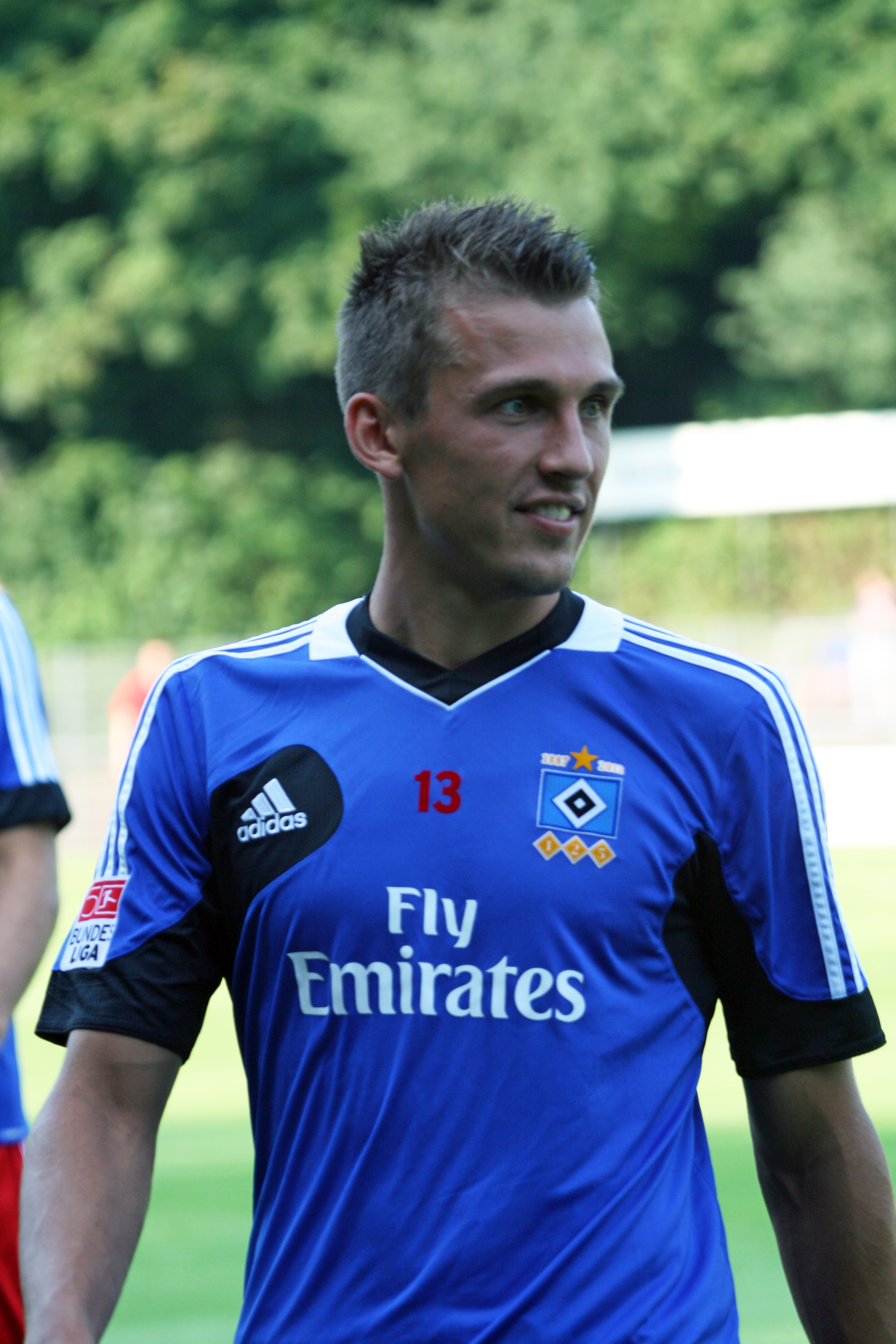
Tesche with HSV in 2012

In summer 2009, Tesche signed a three-year contract with Hamburger SV. The transfer fee was believed to be €1 million.

Tesche made his Hamburger SV debut in an away match against Randers in the third round of the UEFA Europa League, in a 4–0 win, which they went through after winning 4–1 on aggregate. He then made his league debut for Hamburger SV in the away match against VfL Wolfsburg, replacing goalscorer Eljero Elia in the 90th minute, which saw Hamburger SV win 4–2 on 23 August 2009. Four days later, on 27 August 2009, he scored his first goals in the UEFA Europa League play-offs, in a 3–1 win over Guingamp, which saw the club through the group stage after beating them 8–2 on aggregate. However, he spent most of the season on the substitute bench, due to strong competition in the midfield position from Zé Roberto, Mickaël Tavares and Tomás Rincón. He mostly spent his playing time, coming on as a substitute and occasionally started in number of matches. On 11 April 2010 he scored his first goal for the club, in a 2–1 win over VfB Bochum. Two weeks later, on 25 April 2010, he scored again, in a 5–1 loss against 1899 Hoffenheim. Despite suffering a hamstring injury towards the end of the 2009–10 season, he went on to make thirty appearances and scoring two times in all competitions.

The 2010–11 season, Tesche was linked a loan move away from the club, but stayed throughout the summer transfer window. However, at the start of the season, he appeared in number of the matches as an unused substitute. On 2 October 2010 he made his first appearance of the season, starting as a right–back position, in a 2–1 win over 1. FC Kaiserslautern. Having made three starts and two coming on as a substitute by January, he was linked with a move to Hannover 96, but Hamburger SV hold on to keep him at the club throughout the January transfer window. Later in the 2010–11 season, Tesche was given two starts for the side, as the season progressed. At the end of the season, he went on to make twelve appearances in all competitions.

Ahead of the 2011–12 season, Tesche had his contract was extended for three years on 29 July 2011, keeping him until 2014. He started the season well when he scored his first goal of the season, in a 3–1 win over Champions Borussia Dortmund in the opening game of the season. He had since regained his first team place in the starting eleven. Then, on 23 September 2011, Tesche scored his second goal of the season, in a 2–1 win over VfB Stuttgart. In the second half of the season, however, Tesche's playing time was soon reduced, due to being on the substitute bench and his own injury concerns. At the end of the 2011–12 season, he went on to make twenty–three appearances and scoring two times in all competitions.

Ahead of the 2012–13 season, Tesche was among several players expected to leave the club in the summer. However, he ended up staying at the club throughout the summer transfer window, as he wasn't keen on leaving the club abroad following an interest from Russia and Turkey. Despite this, Tesche was featured for the first two league matches of the season against 1. FC Nürnberg and Werder Bremen. However, he was soon fallen out of favour for the rest of the first half of the season. It was also made clear in January when he, among Gojko Kačar, were dropped for the club's pre–training in Abu Dhabi, UAE. He went on to make four appearances for the side.

Upon returning from a loan spell at Fortuna Düsseldorf, Tesche was told to stay away from Hamburger SV and expected to leave the club in the summer as part the club's attempts to cost cut. Throughout the summer transfer window, he preferred a move to a club in Spain and rejected a move to St. Pauli. Ahead of the 2013–14 season, Tesche was sent to the Hamburger SV II as a result of the club's decision. Soon under the management of Bert van Marwijk, he was called up back to the first team and returned to training. However, he didn't appear in the first team under van Marwijk. In March 2014, Tesche was called up to the first team once again, but under the new management of Mirko Slomka. Shortly after, he played his first match – his first match since November 2012 – where he came on as a substitute, in a 1–1 draw against Eintracht Frankfurt on 8 March 2014. For the rest of the 2013–14 season, he became involved in number of matches in the first team under Slomka, as Hamburger SV went on to retain their status in top–flight division football. Despite suffering an injury later in the season, Tesche went on to make eleven appearances in all competitions. At the end of the 2013–14 season, he was released by the club after they decided against renewing his contract.

==== Fortuna Düsseldorf (loan) ====
After playing only 85 minutes in the first half of the 2012–13 Bundesliga season, Tesche transferred to Fortuna Düsseldorf on loan until the end of the campaign.

Tesche made his Fortuna Düsseldorf debut on 20 January 2013 against FC Augsburg, where he came on as a second–half substitute for Axel Bellinghausen, in a 3–2 win. Two weeks later, on 3 February 2013, he set up one of the goals for Robbie Kruse, who scored twice, in a 3–1 win over Stuttgart. Since making his debut for Fortuna Düsseldorf, Tesche quickly established himself in the starting eleven for the side. At the end of the 2012–13 season, however, Tesche was unable to help the club, as they were relegated to the 2. Bundesliga next season. Having made fourteen appearances for the side, he returned to his parent club.

=== Nottingham Forest ===
On 14 August 2014, Tesche completed a free transfer to English Championship club Nottingham Forest, where he signed a one-year contract and was reunited with former Hamburg teammate Michael Mancienne.

Tesche made his Forest debut against Huddersfield Town in a 2–0 win in the second round of the League Cup on 26 August, playing the full ninety minutes at the John Smith's Stadium. He came second, behind goalscorer and fellow midfielder Henri Lansbury, in the fans' poll for man of the match, with 20% of votes to Lansbury's 49%. Tesche made his league debut four days later against Sheffield Wednesday. Since making his debut for the club, Tesche established himself in the first team, playing in the midfield position. He scored his first goal for Forest against Ipswich Town in a 2–2 draw on 5 October 2014, and also scored a spectacular goal from long range in a 1–1 draw with Charlton Athletic two months later on 6 December 2014, a goal against Charlton Athletic later earned him the club's Goal of the Season. His performance by the end of the year later earned the club's Player of the Month for December. By the time of his departure for Nottingham Forest, Tesche finished his first season at the club, making twenty–five appearances and scoring twice in all competitions.

After returning to Forest after his loan, Tesche impressed Freedman in pre-season training and was included in the starting eleven for the first fixture of the 2015–16 season but a broken foot sustained in that match kept him out until December. Once back to fitness, he played regularly until the end of the season. Then, on 23 April 2016, Tesche then scored his first goal of the season, as well as, setting up one of the goals, in a 3–1 win over Fulham. At the end of the 2015–16 season, he went on to make twenty–five appearances and scoring once in all competitions.

Although he had hoped for a new deal with Forest, he was released when his existing contract expired at the end of that season.

=== Birmingham City ===
After Dougie Freedman replaced Stuart Pearce as manager, Tesche was unable to retain his first-team place, and on 2 March 2015, he joined fellow Championship club Birmingham City on loan until the end of the season.

He replaced the suspended Stephen Gleeson in the starting eleven for the next match, at home to Blackpool, and provided the assist for Andy Shinnie's match-winning header. His first goal for the club, a placed shot into the bottom corner after a neat touch from Clayton Donaldson, opened the scoring at home to Rotherham United; Birmingham won 2–1, and Tesche missed late chances to increase the winning margin. He played regularly for the whole of his loan spell, and scored the only goal of Birmingham's last match of the season, away to Bolton Wanderers, to confirm their tenth-place finish. After he made twelve appearances and scored twice for the side by the end of the 2014–15 season, the club tried to sign Tesche on a permanent basis but the move stalled.

After his contract with Forest expired, Tesche returned to Birmingham City on a three-year contract. An early injury disrupted his season, and loss of form in the face of strong competition for places in central midfield meant he made less of an impact than had been expected. He made 26 appearances in all competitions.

In the 2017–18 season, Tesche made one appearance for the side, against Crawley Town in the first round of the League Cup, and scored in a 5–1 win.

=== VfL Bochum ===
Tesche joined 2. Bundesliga club VfL Bochum on 31 August 2017 on loan for the remainder of the season.

Tesche made his VfL Bochum debut, where he started the match, in a 3–1 loss against 1. FC Nürnberg on 20 September 2017. After being sidelined from the first team for two months, he made his return to the first team on 3 December 2017, where he came on as a late substitute, in a 2–1 win over Union Berlin. By February, his playing at the club soon increased and regained his first team place towards the end of the season. On 5 March 2018 he scored his first goal for the club, in a 1–0 win over FC Ingolstadt 04. At the end of the 2017–18 season, Tesche went on to make eighteen appearances and scoring once in all competitions.

Birmingham terminated Tesche's contract by mutual consent at the end of the season, allowing him to sign a two-year deal with Bochum effective from 1 July 2018. At the start of the 2018–19 season, Tesche started well when he scored his first goal of the season, in a 1–0 win over SV Sandhausen on 24 August 2018.

=== Osnabrück ===
On 16 June 2022, Tesche signed with VfL Osnabrück.

On 8 May 2026, Teshed announced his retirement.

== Personal life ==
Tesche married his girlfriend Martina Kuban in 2010.

== Career statistics ==
As of match played 26 April 2021

Appearances and goals by club, season and competition
Club	Season	League			National cup (Note: Includes DFB-Pokal, FA Cup)		League cup (Note: Includes EFL Cup)		Other		Total	
Club	Season	Division	Apps	Goals	Apps	Goals	Apps	Goals	Apps	Goals	Apps	Goals
Arminia Bielefeld II	2005–06	Oberliga Westfalen	1	0	—		—		—		1	0
Arminia Bielefeld II	2006–07	Oberliga Westfalen	21	4	—		—		—		21	4
Arminia Bielefeld II	2007–08	Oberliga Westfalen	8	2	—		—		—		8	2
Arminia Bielefeld II	Total		30	6	—		—		—		30	6
Arminia Bielefeld	2006–07	Bundesliga	7	0	0	0	—		—		7	0
Arminia Bielefeld	2007–08	Bundesliga	15	1	2	0	—		—		17	1
Arminia Bielefeld	2008–09	Bundesliga	26	2	2	0	—		—		28	2
Arminia Bielefeld	Total		48	3	4	0	—		—		52	3
Hamburger SV	2009–10	Bundesliga	16	2	2	0	—		12 (Note: Appearances in UEFA Europa League)	2	30	4
Hamburger SV	2010–11	Bundesliga	11	0	1	0	—		—		12	0
Hamburger SV	2011–12	Bundesliga	23	2	3	0	—		—		26	2
Hamburger SV	2012–13	Bundesliga	4	0	0	0	—		—		4	0
Hamburger SV	2013–14	Bundesliga	9	0	0	0	—		2 (Note: Appearances in the relegation play-offs)	0	11	0
Hamburger SV	Total		63	4	6	0	—		14	2	83	6
Hamburger SV II	2009–10	Regionalliga Nord	1	0	—		—		—		1	0
Hamburger SV II	2013–14	Regionalliga Nord	10	2	—		—		—		10	2
Hamburger SV II	Total		11	2	—		—		—		11	2
Fortuna Düsseldorf (loan)	2012–13	Bundesliga	14	0	0	0	—		—		14	0
Nottingham Forest	2014–15	Championship	22	2	1	0	2	0	—		25	2
Nottingham Forest	2015–16	Championship	24	1	1	0	0	0	—		25	1
Nottingham Forest	Total		46	3	2	0	2	0	—		50	3
Birmingham City (loan)	2014–15	Championship	12	2	—		—		—		12	2
Birmingham City	2016–17	Championship	24	0	1	0	1	0	—		26	0
Birmingham City	2017–18	Championship	0	0	—		1	1	—		1	1
Birmingham City	Total		36	2	1	0	2	1	—		39	3
VfL Bochum (loan)	2017–18	2. Bundesliga	18	1	0	0	—		—		18	1
VfL Bochum	2018–19	2. Bundesliga	31	3	0	0	—		—		31	3
VfL Bochum	2019–20	2. Bundesliga	25	1	1	0	—		—		26	1
VfL Bochum	2020–21	2. Bundesliga	31	7	2	1	—		—		33	8
VfL Bochum	Total		105	12	3	1	—		—		108	13
Career total			353	32	16	1	4	1	14	2	387	36

== Honours ==
VfL Osnabrück

- 3. Liga: 2025–26
