= 2013–14 Hamburger SV season =

Hamburger SV
2013–14 season
- President: Carl-Edgar Jarchow
- Head Coach: Mirko Slomka
- Stadium: Imtech Arena
- Bundesliga: 16th
- DFB-Pokal: Quarter-finals
- Top goalscorer: League: Pierre-Michel Lasogga (13 goals); All: Pierre-Michel Lasogga (15 goals)
Home colours	Away colours	Third colours

The 2013–14 Hamburger SV season was the 126th season in the club's football history. In 2013–14, the club played in the Bundesliga, the top tier of German football. It was the club's 51st consecutive season in this league, being the only club to have played every season in the Bundesliga since its introduction in 1963.

== Competitions ==
=== Overall ===
Competition	Started round	Current position / round	Final position / round	First match	Last match
DFB-Pokal	Round 1	Round 1		2–5 August 2013	TBD
Bundesliga	—	—		9–11 August 2013	10 May 2014

Updated to match played 10 July 2013
Source: Competitions

=== Friendlies ===
5 July 2013	FC Wacker-Innsbruck	2–0	Hamburger SV	Innsbruck
19:15 CEST	Wallner 43'; Wernitznig 47'	Report		Stadium: Tivoli-Neu; Attendance: 6,870; Referee: Robert Schörgenhofer

8 July 2013	Zillertal-Selection	0–7	Hamburger SV	Hippach
18:00 CEST		Report		Stadium: Lindenstadion

8 July 2013	Hamburger SV	2–0	Copenhagen
16:30 CEST	Jansen 8'; Mancienne 50'

16 July 2013	Hamburger SV	3–1	Anderlecht
16:30 CEST	Nuytinck 15'; Iličević 35'; Nafiu 73'		Kljestan 28' (pen.)

20 July 2013	Hamburger SV	0–4	Bayern Munich	Mönchengladbach
16:30 CEST			Boateng 12'; Mandžukić 41'; Kroos 44'; Müller 52'	Stadium: Borussia-Park

21 July 2013	Borussia Dortmund	1–0	Hamburger SV	Mönchengladbach
18:30 CEST	Hofmann 24'			Stadium: Borussia-Park

13 August 2013	Hamburger SV	4–0	Pro Duta FC	Hamburg
	Aogo 3'; Kačar 15'; Biester 24'; Nafiu 68'	Report		Stadium: Imtech Arena

18 January 2014 Winter friendly	Hamburger SV	4–2	Basel	Hamburg
15:30	Çalhanoğlu 29'; Jansen 32'; Lasogga 59', 79'	Report HSV; Report FCB	13' Delgado; 60' Sio	Stadium: Imtech Arena, Attendance: 8,789; Referee: Florian Heft (Wietmarschen)

6 January 2014 Friendly	Arema Indonesia	2–2	Hamburger SV	Malang
19:00 WIB	Gonzales 33'; Sunarto 55'	Report	Van der Vaart 23' (pen.); Zoua 43'	Stadium: Kanjuruhan Stadium; Attendance: 40,000; Referee: Oki Dwi Putra

=== Bundesliga ===
==== League table ====
Pos	Team	Pld	W	D	L	GF	GA	GD	Pts	Qualification or relegation
14	SC Freiburg	34	9	9	16	43	61	−18	36	
15	VfB Stuttgart	34	8	8	18	49	62	−13	32	
16	Hamburger SV (O)	34	7	6	21	51	75	−24	27	Qualification for the relegation play-offs
17	1. FC Nürnberg (R)	34	5	11	18	37	70	−33	26	Relegation to 2. Bundesliga
18	Eintracht Braunschweig (R)	34	6	7	21	29	60	−31	25	Relegation to 2. Bundesliga

Source: DFB
Rules for classification: 1) points; 2) goal difference; 3) number of goals scored.
(O) Play-off winners; (R) Relegated

==== Results summary ====
Overall								Home						Away					
Pld	W	D	L	GF	GA	GD	Pts	W	D	L	GF	GA	GD	W	D	L	GF	GA	GD
20	4	4	12	33	47	−14	16	2	1	7	13	23	−10	2	3	5	20	24	−4

Last updated: 8 February 2014.
Source: kicker

==== Matches ====
11 August 2013 1	Schalke 04	3–3	Hamburger SV	Gelsenkirchen
17:30 CEST	Huntelaar 2', 45+2'; Fuchs (yellow card) 44'; Szalai 72'	Report	Van der Vaart (yellow card) 4', (goal) 12' (pen.); Besister 23'; Arslan (yellow card) 36'; Sobiech 49'	Stadium: Veltins-Arena; Attendance: 61,973; Referee: Manuel Gräfe

17 August 2013 2	Hamburger SV	1–5	1899 Hoffenheim	Hamburg
15:30 CEST	Van der Vaart 44' (pen.); Diekmeier (yellow card) 70'; Arslan (yellow card) 72'	Report	Firmino 5', 77'; Elyounoussi (yellow card) 43'; Volland 50'; Modeste 67', 74'; Polanski (yellow card) 69'	Stadium: Imtech Arena; Attendance: 47,483; Referee: Günter Perl

24 August 2013 3	Hertha BSC	1–0	Hamburger SV	Berlin
18:30 CEST	Schulz (yellow card) 38'; Ramos 74'	Report	Westermann (yellow card) 17'; Zoua (yellow card) 28'; Lam (yellow card) 28'; Beister (yellow card) 62'	Stadium: Olympiastadion; Attendance: 63,574; Referee: Marco Fritz

31 August 2013 4	Hamburger SV	4–0	Eintracht Braunschweig	Hamburg
15:30 CEST	Van der Vaart 7'; Zoua 17', (yellow card) 87'; Çalhanoğlu 80', 90+1'	Report	Bičakčić (yellow card) 32'; Theuerkauf (yellow card) 56'; Bellarabi (yellow card) 60'; Jackson (yellow card) 64'	Stadium: Imtech Arena; Attendance: 54,958; Referee: Knut Kircher

14 September 2013 5	Borussia Dortmund	6–2	Hamburger SV	Dortmund
18:30 CEST	Aubameyang 19', 65'; Mkhitaryan 22'; Lewandowski 73', 81'; Reus 74'	Report	Lam 26'; Rincón (yellow card) 28'; Van der Vaart (yellow card) 44'; Westermann 49'; Diekmeier (yellow card) 51'; Arslan (yellow card) 71'	Stadium: Signal Iduna Park; Attendance: 80,645; Referee: Tobias Welz

21 September 2013 6	Hamburger SV	0–2	Werder Bremen	Hamburg
15:30 CEST	Beister (yellow card) 29'; Van der Vaart (yellow card) 63'	Report	Petersen 32', 90+4', (yellow card) 90+5'; Fritz (yellow card) 40'; Ignjovski (yellow card) 55'; García (yellow card) 90+4'	Stadium: Imtech Arena; Attendance: 53,290; Referee: Wolfgang Stark

28 September 2013 7	Eintracht Frankfurt	2–2	Hamburger SV	Frankfurt
18:30 CEST	Flum 31'; Russ 54', (yellow card) 90+1'; Oczipka (yellow card) 82'	Report	Lasogga 45+3'; Arslan (yellow card) 46'; Jansen 86'	Stadium: Commerzbank-Arena; Attendance: 50,700; Referee: Thorsten Kinhöfer

6 October 2013 8	1. FC Nürnberg	0–5	Hamburger SV	Nuremberg
15:30 CEST	Pogatetz (yellow card) 76'	Report	Van der Vaart 17'; Lasogga 59', 63', 67'; Arslan 74'	Stadium: Grundig-Stadion; Attendance: 38,042; Referee: Markus Schmidt

20 October 2013 9	Hamburger SV	3–3	VfB Stuttgart	Hamburg
15:30 CEST	Lasogga 22'; Beister 55'; Van der Vaart 67'; Badelj (yellow card) 81'	Report	Maxim 3'; Gentner 37'; Djourou 64' (o.g.); Kvist (yellow card) 71'; Rüdiger (red card) 84'; Ibišević (yellow card) 90'	Stadium: Imtech Arena; Attendance: 53,167; Referee: Tobias Welz

27 October 2013 10	SC Freiburg	0–3	Hamburger SV	Freiburg im Breisgau
15:30 CEST	Coquelin (yellow card) 74'; Diagne (yellow card) 82'	Report	Beister 37'; Sobiech (yellow card) 40'; Lasogga 47'; Van der Vaart 63'	Stadium: Mage Solar Stadion; Attendance: 24,000; Referee: Peter Gagelmann

2 November 2013 11	Hamburger SV	0–2	Borussia Mönchengladbach	Hamburg
15:30 CET		Report	Kruse 23', 63'; Stranzl (yellow card) 46'; Korb (yellow card) 73'	Stadium: Imtech Arena; Attendance: 57,000; Referee: Markus Schmidt

9 November 2013 12	Bayer Leverkusen	5–3	Hamburger SV	Leverkusen
15:30 CET	Son 9', 16', 55'; Toprak (yellow card) 24'; Donati (yellow card) 59'; Kießling 72'; Can (yellow card) 76'; Jansen (yellow card) 52'; Castro 89'	Report	Beister 23', (yellow card) 76'; Lasogga 49', 74'; Arslan (yellow card) 83'; Iličević (yellow card) 87'	Stadium: BayArena; Attendance: 30,077; Referee: Robert Hartmann

24 November 2013 13	Hamburger SV	3–1	Hannover 96	Hamburg
15:30 CET	Beister (yellow card) 26'; Badelj 31'; Beister 46'; Iličević (yellow card) 81'; Çalhanoğlu 84'	Report	Huszti 28', (yellow card) 90+3'; Schulz (yellow card) 38'; Sané (yellow card) 60' (yellow-red card) 90'	Stadium: Imtech Arena; Attendance: 52,091; Referee: Marco Fritz

29 November 2013 14	VfL Wolfsburg	1–1	Hamburger SV	Wolfsburg
20:30 CET	Rodríguez 31' (pen.); Ochs (yellow card) 36'; Arnold (yellow card) 38'; Naldo (yellow card) 58'; Knoche (yellow card) 74'	Report	Çalhanoğlu 19'; Arslan (yellow card) 52'	Stadium: Volkswagen Arena; Attendance: 28,648; Referee: Felix Brych

7 December 2013 15	Hamburger SV	0–1	FC Augsburg	Hamburg
15:30 CET	Beister (yellow card) 78'; Arslan (yellow card) 84'	Report	Bobadilla 18'; Werner (yellow card) 63'	Stadium: Imtech Arena; Attendance: 46,213; Referee: Daniel Siebert

14 December 2013 16	Bayern Munich	3–1	Hamburger SV	Munich
15:30 CET	Mandžukić 42'; Götze 52'; Shaqiri 90+3'	Report	Van der Vaart (yellow card) 2'; Drobný (yellow card) 4'; Lasogga 87'	Stadium: Allianz Arena; Attendance: 71,000; Referee: Tobias Welz

21 December 2013 17	Hamburger SV	2–3	Mainz 05	Hamburg
15:30 CET	Çalhanoğlu 21'; Rincón (yellow card) 66' (yellow-red card) 82'; Djourou (yellow card) 75'; Van der Vaart 79'	Report	Moritz (yellow card) 14'; Okazaki 47', 90+2'; Müller 50'	Stadium: Imtech Arena; Attendance: 50,918; Referee: Bastian Dankert

26 January 2014 18	Hamburger SV	0–3	Schalke 04	Hamburg
17:30 CET		Report	Huntelaar 34'; Uchida (yellow card) 37'; Huntelaar (yellow card) 38'; Farfán 53'; Meyer 56'	Stadium: Imtech Arena; Attendance: 49,457; Referee: Peter Sippel

1 February 2014 19	1899 Hoffenheim	3–0	Hamburger SV	Sinsheim
15:30 CET	Firmino 4'; Süle 44'; Beck 60'	Report	Badelj (yellow card) 42'	Stadium: Rhein-Neckar Arena; Attendance: 25,603; Referee: Günter Perl

8 February 2014 20	Hamburger SV	0–3	Hertha BSC	Hamburg
18:30 CET	Arslan (yellow card) 72'; Westermann (yellow card) 80'	Report	Allagui 15'; Ramos 23', 38'	Stadium: Imtech Arena; Attendance: 48,593; Referee: Deniz Aytekin

15 February 2014 21	Eintracht Braunschweig	4–2	Hamburger SV	Braunschweig
15:30 CET	Bellarabi (yellow card) 15'; Boland (yellow card) 32'; Theuerkauf (yellow card) 38'; Reichel (yellow card) 45+2'; Kumbela 51', 61', 85', (yellow card) 65'; Hochscheidt (yellow card) 89', (goal) 90+3'	Report	Diekmeier (yellow card) 15'; Lasogga 23'; Rincón (yellow card) 58'; Westermann (yellow card) 60'; Bouy (yellow card) 70'; Iličević 76'; Arslan (yellow card) 79'	Stadium: Eintracht-Stadion; Attendance: 23,200; Referee: Knut Kircher

22 February 2014 22	Hamburger SV	3–0	Borussia Dortmund	Hamburg
15:30 CET	Jiráček 42'; Rincón (yellow card) 46'; Lasogga 58'; Zoua (yellow card) 86'; Çalhanoğlu 90+1'	Report	Aubameyang (yellow card) 55'; Reus (yellow card) 90'	Stadium: Imtech Arena; Attendance: 57,000; Referee: Felix Brych

1 March 2014 23	Werder Bremen	1–0	Hamburger SV	Bremen
15:30 CET	Junuzović 19', (yellow card) 53'; Di Santo (yellow card) 34'	Report	Lasogga (yellow card) 28'; Çalhanoğlu (yellow card) 40'	Stadium: Weser-Stadion; Attendance: 42,100; Referee: Florian Meyer

8 March 2014 24	Hamburger SV	1–1	Eintracht Frankfurt	Hamburg
15:30 CET	Westermann (yellow card) 58'; Badelj (yellow card) 66'; Çalhanoğlu 72' (pen.); Zoua (yellow card) 79'	Report	Madlung 29'; Barnetta (yellow card) 42'; Djakpa (yellow card) 60'; Zambrano (yellow card) 71'	Stadium: Imtech Arena; Attendance: 51,191; Referee: Michael Weiner

16 March 2014 25	Hamburger SV	2–1	1. FC Nürnberg	Hamburg
15:30 CET	Çalhanoğlu 80'; Frantz 86' (o.g.)	Report	Plattenhardt (yellow card) 2'; Petrák (yellow card) 2'; Drmić 90+1'	Stadium: Imtech Arena; Attendance: 52,183; Referee: Marco Fritz

22 March 2014 26	VfB Stuttgart	1–0	Hamburger SV	Stuttgart
15:30 CET	Maxim 69'; Ulreich (yellow card) 89'	Report	Çalhanoğlu (yellow card) 16' (yellow-red card) 53'	Stadium: Mercedes-Benz Arena; Attendance: 55,000; Referee: Felix Brych

26 March 2014 27	Hamburger SV	1–1	SC Freiburg	Hamburg
20:00 CET	Lasogga 5'; Badelj (yellow card) 65'	Report	Mehmedi (yellow card) 42'; Darida 50'; Klaus (yellow card) 53'	Stadium: Imtech Arena; Attendance: 44,629; Referee: Deniz Aytekin

30 March 2014 28	Borussia Mönchengladbach	3–1	Hamburger SV	Mönchengladbach
15:30 CET	Daems 37'; Raffael 75'; Domínguez 78'	Report	Zoua 28'; Mancienne (yellow card) 65'	Stadium: Borussia-Park; Attendance: 53,650; Referee: Thorsten Kinhöfer

4 April 2014 29	Hamburger SV	2–1	Bayer Leverkusen	Hamburg
20:30 CEST	Calhanoglu 4'; Westermann 82'; Jiráček (yellow card) 86'; Rincón (yellow card) 87'	Report	Brandt (yellow card) 44', (goal) 58'	Stadium: Imtech Arena; Attendance: 47,000; Referee: Bastian Dankert

12 April 2014 30	Hannover 96	2–1	Hamburger SV	Hanover
15:30 CEST	Stindl 9'; Ya Konan 86'	Report	Calhanoglu 48'; Jiráček (yellow card) 68'	Stadium: HDI-Arena; Attendance: 49,000; Referee: Robert Hartmann

19 April 2014 31	Hamburger SV	1–3	VfL Wolfsburg	Hamburg
18:30 CEST	Iličević 58'; Tesche (yellow card) 89'	Report	Perišić 2'; De Bruyne 42'; Olić 49'; Luiz Gustavo (yellow card) 67' (yellow-red card) 90'	Stadium: Imtech Arena; Attendance: 56,279; Referee: Peter Sippel

27 April 2014 32	FC Augsburg	3–1	Hamburger SV	Augsburg
15:30 CEST	Ostrzolek (yellow card) 4'; Altıntop 6', 32'; Hahn 42'	Report	Westermann 44'; Çalhanoğlu (yellow card) 59'; Arslan (yellow card) 77'	Stadium: SGL arena Attendance: 30,660; Referee: Tobias Welz

3 May 2014 33	Hamburger SV	1–4	Bayern Munich	Hamburg
15:30 CEST	Çalhanoğlu 72'; Demirbay (yellow card) 86'	Report	Götze 32', 69'; Müller 55'; Martínez (yellow card) 64'; Pizarro 75'; Boateng (red card) 86'	Stadium: Imtech Arena; Attendance: 57,000; Referee: Marco Fritz

10 May 2014 34	Mainz 05	3–2	Hamburger SV	Mainz
15:30 CEST	Soto 7'; Mallı 65'; Okazaki 82'	Report	Lasogga 12'; Iličević 84'	Stadium: Coface Arena; Attendance: 34,000; Referee: Thorsten Kinhöfer

===== Relegation play-offs =====
Hamburger SV, who finished 16th, faced Greuther Fürth, the third-placed 2013–14 2. Bundesliga side, for a two-legged play-off. The winner on aggregate score after both matches earned entry into the 2014–15 Bundesliga. Hamburg prevailed, avoiding their possible first relegation.

15 May 2014 First leg	Hamburger SV	0–0	Greuther Fürth	Hamburg
20:30 CEST		Report		Stadium: Imtech Arena; Attendance: 56,479; Referee: Felix Zwayer

18 May 2014 Second leg	Greuther Fürth	1–1 (1–1a agg.)	Hamburger SV	Fürth
17:00 CEST	Fürstner 59'	Report	Lasogga 14'	Stadium: Trolli Arena; Attendance: 17,500; Referee: Knut Kircher

=== DFB-Pokal ===
4 August 2013 First round	Schott Jena	0–4	Hamburger SV	Jena
17:30 CEST		Report	Rudņevs 72', 76'; Van der Vaart 79'; Zoua 83'	Stadium: Ernst-Abbe-Sportfeld; Attendance: 11,800; Referee: Christian Leicher

24 September 2013 Second round	Hamburger SV	1–0	Greuther Fürth	Hamburg
20:30 CEST	Lasogga 64'	Report		Stadium: Volksparkstadion; Attendance: 26,842; Referee: Sascha Stegemann

3 December 2013 Third round	Hamburger SV	2–1	1. FC Köln	Hamburg
19:00 CET	Beister 42'; Iličević 85'	Report	Matuszczyk 54'	Stadium: Imtech Arena; Attendance: 57,000; Referee: Florian Meyer

12 February 2014 Quarter-finals	Hamburger SV	0–5	Bayern Munich	Hamburg
20:30 CET		Report	Mandžukić 22', 74', 76'; Dante 26'; Robben 54'	Stadium: Imtech Arena; Attendance: 57,000; Referee: Felix Zwayer

== Squad information ==
=== Squad and statistics ===
==== Squad, appearances and goals ====
As of 15 December 2012

No.	Pos	Nat	Player	Total		Bundesliga		DFB-Pokal	
No.	Pos	Nat	Player	Apps	Goals	Apps	Goals	Apps	Goals
1	GK	(Czech Republic) CZE	Jaroslav Drobný	0	0	0	0	0	0
2	DF	(Germany) GER	Dennis Diekmeier	6	0	6	0	0	0
3	DF	(England) ENG	Michael Mancienne	0	0	0	0		
4	DF	(Germany) GER	Heiko Westermann	16	0	16	0	0	0
5	DF	(Germany) GER	Abdullah Bidav	19	9	19	9	0	0
6	DF	(Germany) GER	Dennis Aogo	2	0	2	0	0	0
7	MF	(Germany) GER	Marcell Jansen	13	0	13	0	0	0
8	MF	(Venezuela) VEN	Tomás Rincón	0	0	0	0	0	0
9	MF	(Turkey) TUR	Hakan Çalhanoğlu	32	11	32	11	0	0
10	FW	(Latvia) LAT	Artjoms Rudņevs	0	0	0	0	0	0
11	MF	(Croatia) CRO	Ivo Iličević	0	0	0	0	0	0
12	GK	(Germany) GER	Tom Mickel	0	0	0	0	0	0
13	MF	(Germany) GER	Robert Tesche	0	0	0	0	0	0
14	MF	(Croatia) CRO	Milan Badelj	29	1	29	1	0	0
15	GK	(Germany) GER	René Adler	15	0	15	0	0	0
17	MF	(Germany) GER	Zhi-Gin Lam	0	0	0	0	0	0
18	MF	(Turkey) TUR	Tolgay Arslan	0	0	0	0	0	0
19	MF	(Czech Republic) CZE	Petr Jiráček	0	0	0	0	0	0
20	DF	(Austria) AUT	Paul Scharner	0	0	0	0	0	0
21	MF	(Germany) GER	Maximilian Beister	16	5	16	5	0	0
22	MF	(Italy) ITA	Jacopo Sala	0	0	0	0	0	0
23	MF	(Netherlands) NED	Rafael van der Vaart	14	7	14	7	0	0
24	DF	(Serbia) SRB	Slobodan Rajković	0	0	0	0	0	0
30	GK	(Germany) GER	Sven Neuhaus	0	0	0	0	0	0
33	MF	(Denmark) DEN	Christian Nörgaard	0	0	0	0	0	0
33	FW	(North Macedonia) MKD	Valmir Nafiu	0	0	0	0	0	0
37	DF	(Germany) GER	Janek Sternberg	0	0	0	0	0	0
44	MF	(Serbia) SRB	Gojko Kačar	0	0	0	0	0	0

==== Goal scorers ====
All competitions

Scorer	Goals

Bundesliga

Scorer	Goals

DFB-Pokal

Scorer	Goals

== Kits ==
Home	Away Alternate	Away	Third

Type	Shirt	Shorts	Socks	First appearance / Info
Home	White	Red	Blue	
Home Alt.	White	White	White	Bundesliga, Match 5, September 15 against Dortmund
Away	Black	Black	Black	
Third	Red	Red	Red	
