= Maximilian Beister =

German footballer (born 1990)

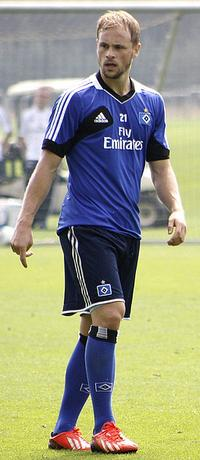
- Beister training with Hamburger SV in 2013

Personal information
- Date of birth: 6 September 1990 (age 36)
- Place of birth: Göttingen, West Germany
- Height: 1.80 m (5 ft 11 in)
- Position: Forward

Youth career
- 1995–2004: VfL Lüneburg
- 2004–2009: Hamburger SV

Senior career*
Years	Team	Apps	(Gls)
2008–2015	Hamburger SV II	46	(13)
2009–2015	Hamburger SV	46	(8)
2010–2012	→ Fortuna Düsseldorf (loan)	59	(18)
2015–2016	Mainz 05 II	2	(0)
2015–2017	Mainz 05	1	(0)
2016	→ 1860 Munich (loan)	8	(0)
2016–2017	→ Melbourne Victory (loan)	9	(1)
2018–2019	Uerdingen 05	47	(23)
2019–2022	FC Ingolstadt 04	47	(9)
Total		265	(72)

International career
2009	Germany U19	5	(0)
2009–2011	Germany U20	9	(5)
2010–2013	Germany U21	14	(6)
- * Club domestic league appearances and goals

Maximilian Beister (born 6 September 1990) is a German former professional footballer who played as a forward.

== Club career ==
=== Hamburger SV ===
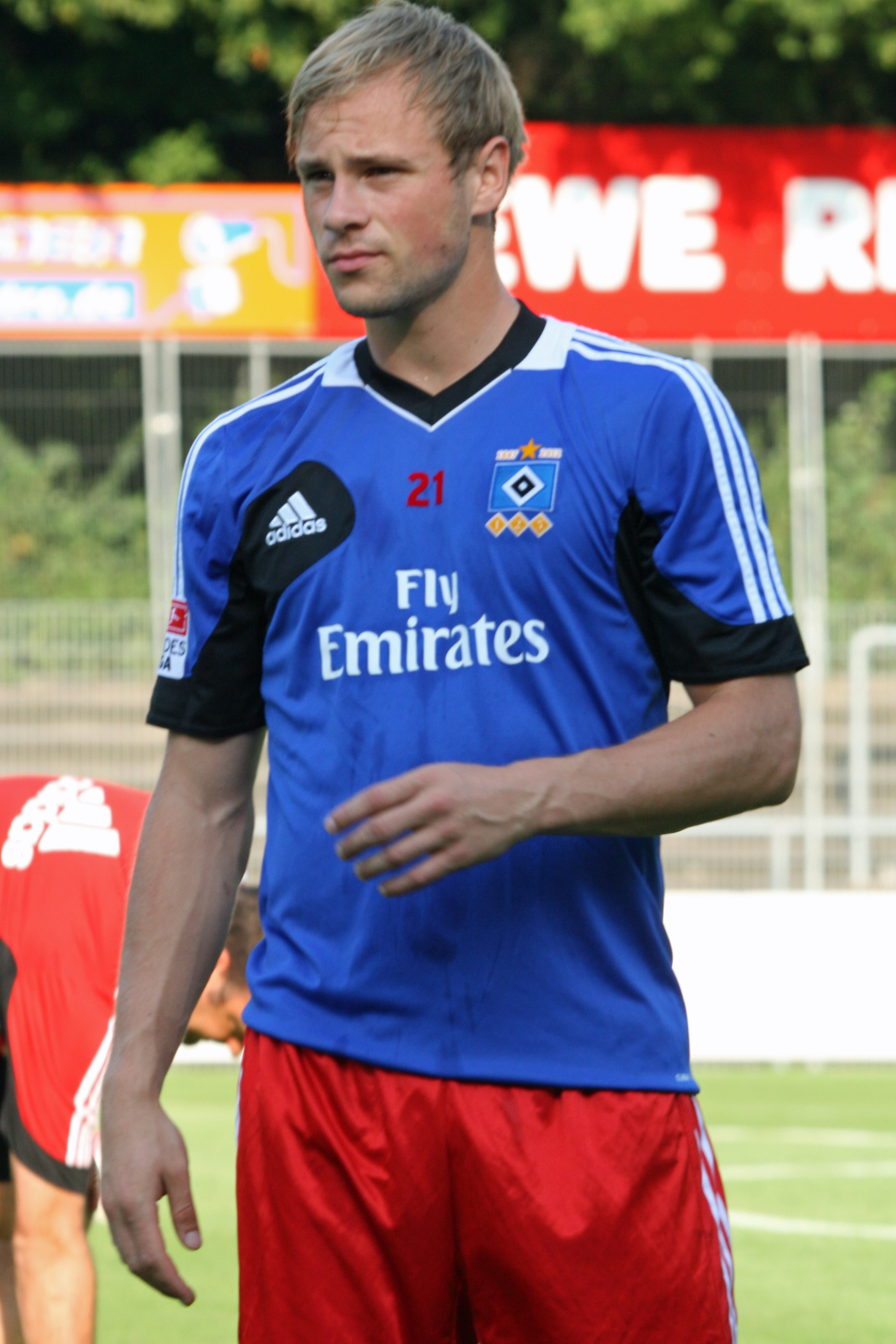
Beister training during his time at Hamburger SV in 2013

Beister began his career 2001 with VfL Lüneburg. In 2004, he joined the Hamburger SV youth academy.

In the 2008–09 season, he made his debut in the reserve team of HSV on 21 August 2008 against 1. FC Magdeburg. In January 2009, Beister signed his first professional contract with the club and signed a contract again, keeping him until 2013. Ahead of the 2009–10 season, Beister was promoted to the club's first team. Beister made his Bundesliga debut on 22 November 2009 against VfL Bochum, coming on as a late substitute, in a 1–0 loss. He also made another appearance later in the season, coming on as a late substitute, in a 1–0 defeat to 1. FSV Mainz 05 on 17 April 2010.

=== Fortuna Düsseldorf ===
On 26 May 2010, Beister joined Fortuna Düsseldorf on a two-year loan.

Beister made his Fortuna Düsseldorf debut, where he started and played for 65 minutes, in a 1–0 loss against TuS Koblenz in the first round of the DFB–Pokal. It was not until on 11 September 2010 when he made his league debut for the club, in a 1–0 loss against FSV Frankfurt. His first goal for the club did not come until on 18 December 2010 against Greuther Fürth in a 1–0 win. He then scored twice on 28 January 2011, in a 6–0 win over FSV Frankfurt. At the end of the 2010–11 season, where he established himself in the midfield position, Beister had made 27 appearances and scored seven times.

In the 2011–12 season, Beister continued to be a first team regular at Fortuna Düsseldorf and started well when he scored two goals in two games against Eintracht Frankfurt and TSV 1860 Munich. Unlike the previous season at Fortuna Düsseldorf, he said that he was confident that he had grown and overcome his homesickness. He continued to play in good form when he set up two goals in a 4–2 win over Karlsruher SC on 10 September 2011 and then scored two more braces by the end of 2011 against Energie Cottbus and FSV Frankfurt. After scoring eight times by the end of the first half of the season, Beister scored three more goals, including two vital goals in both wins against Karlsruher SC and Erzgebirge Aue. Throughout the 2011–12 season, Beister played in the right midfield position, though played as a centre–forward occasionally. Despite facing setback in April, Beister continued to remain in the first team and played in both legs against Hertha BSC, which he scored the opener in the second leg, in a 2–2 draw, resulting their promotion to the Bundesliga. Following this, Beister went on to make a total of 38 appearances and scoring 12 times.

At the end of the 2011–12 season, the club was keen on signing Beister again following their promotion to the Bundesliga. However, he opted to return to his parent club, Hamburger SV, to make a first team breakthrough and develop. This was solved at the club when he signed a contract extension, keeping him until 2016.

=== Return to Hamburger SV ===
After his two–years spell at Fortuna Düsseldorf came to an end, Beister was linked with a move away from the club, with Borussia Dortmund interested in signing him. Despite this, Beister stayed at Hamburger SV and was expected to feature in the first team ahead of the 2012–13 season. At the start of the 2012–13 season, Beister found himself in a competition over a first team position in midfield with Ivo Iličević and Gökhan Töre. Nevertheless, Beister received a handful of first team appearances on his Hamburger SV return and scored in a 4–2 defeat to Karlsruher SC in the first round of the DFB-Pokal on 19 August 2012. Beister then scored two goals in two league matches on 27 November 2012 and 2 December 2012 against Schalke 04 and Wolfsburg. After scoring against Greuther Fürth on 2 March 2013, Beister was then sent–off in the 80th minute, just 11 minutes after coming on as a substitute for a foul on Daniel Baier with an unnatural foot stretch in the Kung-Fu style. Despite having set back later in the season and serving a five match suspension in March, Beister finished the 2012–13 season, making 24 appearances and scoring four times.

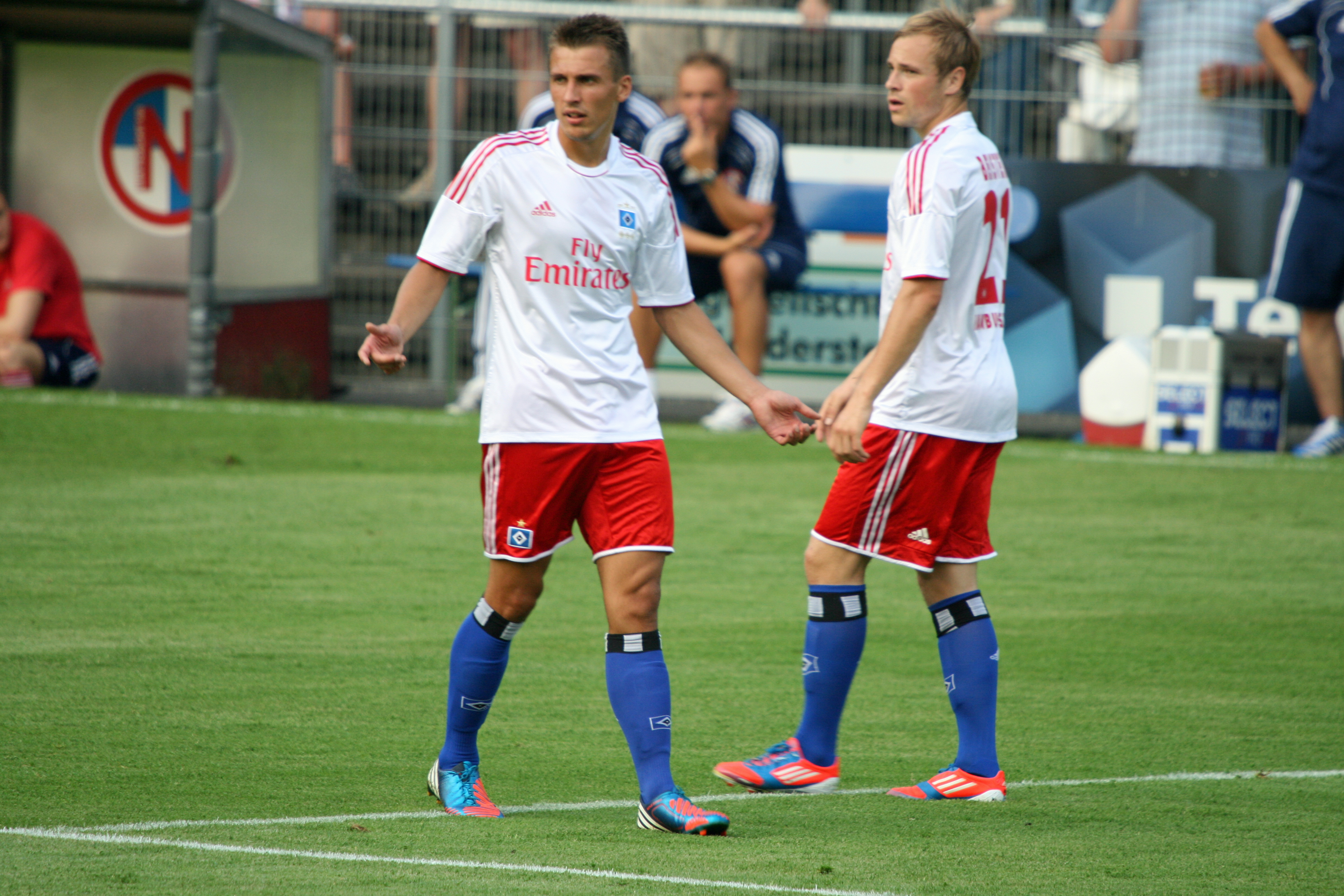
Beister playing alongside Robert Tesche in 2012

In the 2013–14 season, Beister started the season when he scored in the opening game of the season, in a 3–3 draw against Schalke 04. After being suspended for picking five yellow cards this season, Beister's return was short–lived when he suffered a cruciate ligament rupture during a friendly match against Vitesse in January and was sidelined for the rest of the season. At the end of the 2013–14 season, Beister had made 19 appearances and scored six times.

However, in the 2014–15 season, Beister remained on the sidelines since the start of the season, due to injuries. In January 2015, he made his return from injury, playing in a friendly match against Eintracht Frankfurt which Hamburger SV won 3–2. Beister made five appearances in the 2014–15 season, having spent the rest of the season at the reserve after returning from injury.

=== Mainz 05 ===
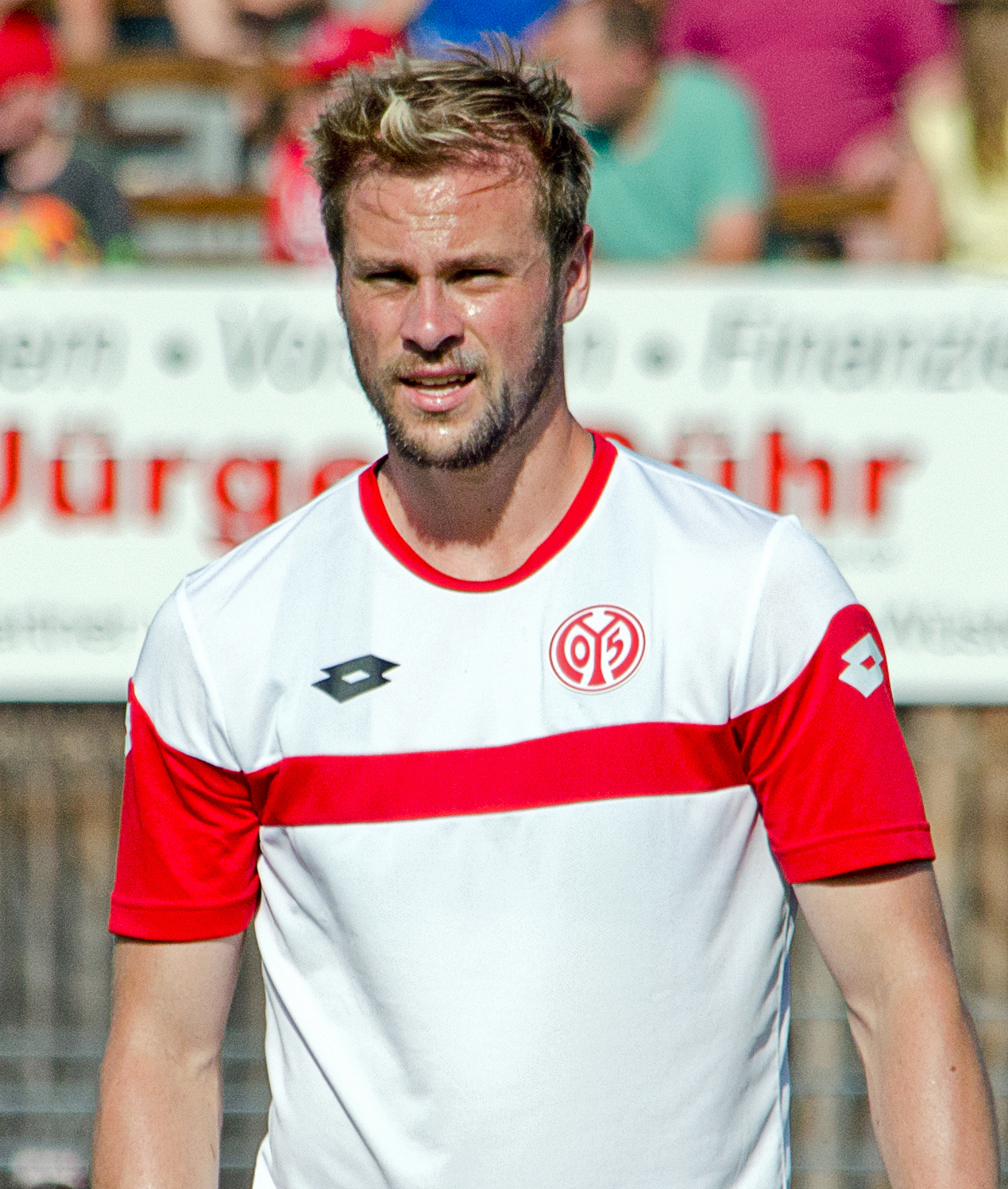
Beister training with Mainz 05 in 2015

In May 2015, his contract at Hamburger SV was terminated one year early by mutual agreement because he was not expected to feature in the next season. He signed a three-year contract with 1. FSV Mainz 05.

However at the start of the season, Beister suffered an injury on his knee and missed out throughout August. Even after returning from injury, he remained out of the first team, due to competition in the midfield position. Despite this, Beister made his only 1. FSV Mainz 05 appearance, coming on as a substitute, in a 3–1 win against his former club, Hamburger SV on 5 December 2015.

==== 1860 Munich ====
On 1 February 2016, Beister joined 1860 Munich on loan for the rest of the season. He made his 1860 Munich debut on 6 February 2016, in a 1–0 loss against 1. FC Nürnberg. After the loan had ended, in which he made eight appearances for the side, he went on trial at Darmstadt 98 in August 2016. When he was eventually not signed, he returned to Mainz and was assigned to the reserve team.

=== Melbourne Victory ===
On 18 October 2016, it was announced that Beister signed for A-League club Melbourne Victory on a one-year loan. Beister made his debut for Melbourne Victory on 12 November 2016, coming on as a substitute for Fahid Ben Khalfallah. Beister scored Melbourne Victory's third goal of the match in a 3–0 win. He returned to Germany after less than four months on compassionate grounds.

After initially staying for the rest of the season following his loan spell at Melbourne Victory came to an end, Beister left the club by mutual agreement at the end of the 2016–17 season.

=== KFC Uerdingen 05 ===
In January 2018, Beister joined KFC Uerdingen 05 on a two-and-a-half-year contract until 2020.

== International career ==
Beister made his international debut for the Germany U19 national team on 11 February 2009 in a friendly against Greece and earned between November 2009 five caps.

On 9 October 2009, he made his debut for the Germany U20 against Switzerland, in which he scored while Germany lost 3–2. Beister went on to make nine appearances scoring five times for the Germany U20.

In November 2010, Beister was called up by Germany U21 for the first time. He made his Germany U21 debut against England on 16 November 2010, where he played 33 minutes after coming on as a substitute, in a 2–0 win. It wasn't until on 1 September 2011 when he scored his first Germany U21 goal, in a 7–0 win over San Marino. Over the next two months for the side, he scored two more goals against San Marino and Cyprus. On 14 August 2012, he scored a brace in a 6–1 win over Argentina U20 in a friendly match. Overall, he made 14 appearances and scored six times for the Germany U21.

== Personal life ==
Born in Göttingen, West Germany, Beister lived in Lüneburg for seventeen years before moving to Hamburg, where he attended boarding school.

While being sidelined with a knee injury, Beister opened the Immerschlau auxiliary school in Hamburg to help children with education. He is also a board of director of SC Lüneburg 2014, along with his father.

== Career statistics ==
Appearances and goals by club, season and competition
Club	Season	League			DFB-Pokal		Other		Total	
Club	Season	Division	Apps	Goals	Apps	Goals	Apps	Goals	Apps	Goals
Hamburger SV II	2008–09	Regionalliga Nord	17	2	—		—		17	2
Hamburger SV II	2009–10	Regionalliga Nord	24	9	—		—		24	9
Hamburger SV II	2014–15	Regionalliga Nord	5	2	—		—		5	2
Hamburger SV II	Total		46	13	—		0	0	46	13
Hamburger SV	2009–10	Bundesliga	2	0	0	0	—		2	0
Hamburger SV	2012–13	Bundesliga	23	3	1	1	—		24	4
Hamburger SV	2013–14	Bundesliga	16	5	3	1	—		19	6
Hamburger SV	2014–15	Bundesliga	5	0	0	0	—		5	0
Hamburger SV	Total		46	8	4	2	0	0	50	10
Fortuna Düsseldorf (loan)	2010–11	2. Bundesliga	26	7	1	0	—		27	7
Fortuna Düsseldorf (loan)	2011–12	2. Bundesliga	33	11	3	0	2 (Note: Appearances in the 2. Bundesliga promotion play-offs)	1	38	12
Fortuna Düsseldorf (loan)	Total		59	18	4	0	2	1	65	19
Mainz 05	2015–16	Bundesliga	1	0	0	0	0	0	1	0
Mainz 05 II	2015–16	3. Liga	1	0	—		0	0	1	0
Mainz 05 II	2016–17	3. Liga	1	0	—		0	0	1	0
Mainz 05 II	Total		2	0	—		0	0	2	0
1860 Munich (loan)	2015–16	2. Bundesliga	8	0	0	0	—		8	0
Melbourne Victory (loan)	2016–17	A-League	9	1	—		—		9	1
Uerdingen 05	2017–18	Regionalliga West	16	12	—		—		16	12
Uerdingen 05	2018–19	3. Liga	31	11	—		—		31	11
Uerdingen 05	Total		47	23	—		0	0	47	23
FC Ingolstadt 04	2019–20	3. Liga	26	7	1	0	1 (Note: Appearance in play-offs)	0	28	7
FC Ingolstadt 04	2020–21	3. Liga	12	2	1	0	1	0	14	2
FC Ingolstadt 04	2021–22	2. Bundesliga	9	0	0	0	—		9	0
FC Ingolstadt 04	Total		47	9	2	0	2	0	51	9
Career total			265	72	10	2	4	1	279	75
