= Andreas Lambertz =

German footballer (born 1984)

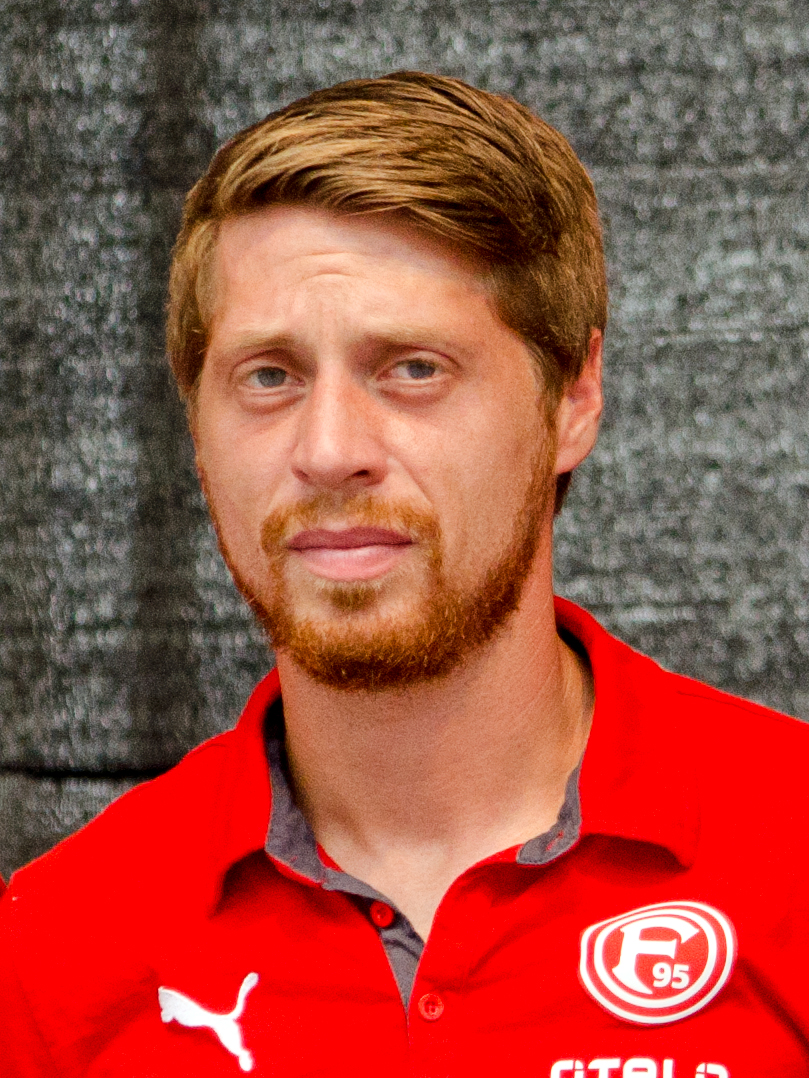
- Lambertz with Fortuna Düsseldorf in 2014

Personal information
- Date of birth: 15 October 1984 (age 42)
- Place of birth: Hackenbroich, West Germany
- Height: 1.75 m (5 ft 9 in)
- Position: Midfielder

Team information
- Current team: Fortuna Düsseldorf II (assistant)

Youth career
- SG Orken-Noithausen
- Bayer Dormagen
- TSV Norf
- Borussia Mönchengladbach

Senior career*
Years	Team	Apps	(Gls)
–2002	VfR Neuss		
2002–2015	Fortuna Düsseldorf	284	(38)
2015–2018	Dynamo Dresden	74	(7)
2018–2020	Fortuna Düsseldorf II	12	(0)

Managerial career
- 2020–: Fortuna Düsseldorf II (assistant)
- * Club domestic league appearances and goals

Andreas "Lumpi" Lambertz (born 15 October 1984) is a retired German footballer and current assistant manager of Fortuna Düsseldorf II.

He is the first German football player to have promoted from the fourth tier to first tier with only one club.

== Career ==
=== Youth career ===
Lambertz began his youth football career in 1990 with SG Orken/Noithausen. He also played for Bayer Dormagen, TSV Norf, Borussia Mönchengladbach and VfR Neuss prior to joining Fortuna Düsseldorf.

=== Fortuna Düsseldorf ===
Lambertz began his professional career at Fortuna Düsseldorf which was playing in the Oberliga Nordrhein at the time.

Lambertz was in the starting lineup that sent Fortuna Düsseldorf to the Bundesliga for the first time in 15 years.

Lambertz started the 2012–13 season with a two match ban. The ban is for celebrating with a torch in his hand after the 2nd leg of the promotion/relegation playoff when Fortuna Düsseldorf defeated Hertha BSC on aggregate.

== Personal life ==
Lambertz has one sister. He is married with a son born in 2006 and daughter born in 2011 and lives in Korschenbroich.

== Career statistics ==
=== Club ===
As of 2 July 2018

Appearances and goals by club, season and competition
Club	Season	League			Cup		Other^{1}		Total		Ref.
Club	Season	Division	Apps	Goals	Apps	Goals	Apps	Goals	Apps	Goals	Ref.
Fortuna Düsseldorf	2003–04	Oberliga Nordrhein	23	2	—		—		23	2	
Fortuna Düsseldorf	2004–05	Regionalliga Nord	29	3	1	0	—		30	3	
Fortuna Düsseldorf	2005–06	Regionalliga Nord	28	6	—		—		28	6	
Fortuna Düsseldorf	2006–07	Regionalliga Nord	33	4	—		—		33	4	
Fortuna Düsseldorf	2007–08	Regionalliga Nord	30	8	—		—		30	8	
Fortuna Düsseldorf	2008–09	3. Liga	30	5	—		—		30	5	
Fortuna Düsseldorf	2009–10	2. Bundesliga	31	2	1	1	—		32	3	
Fortuna Düsseldorf	2010–11	2. Bundesliga	23	5	0	0	—		23	5	
Fortuna Düsseldorf	2011–12	2. Bundesliga	30	4	3	0	2	0	35	4	
Fortuna Düsseldorf	2012–13	Bundesliga	28	1	3	0	—		31	1	
Fortuna Düsseldorf	2013–14	2. Bundesliga	21	0	1	0	—		22	0	
Fortuna Düsseldorf	2014–15	2. Bundesliga	14	0	1	0	—		15	0	
Fortuna Düsseldorf	Totals		320	40	10	1	2	0	332	41	—
Fortuna Düsseldorf II	2014–15	Regionalliga West	1	0	—				1	0	
Dynamo Dresden	2015–16	3. Liga	34	3	0	0	—		34	3	
Dynamo Dresden	2016–17	2. Bundesliga	28	3	0	0	—		28	3	
Dynamo Dresden	2017–18	2. Bundesliga	12	1	0	0	—		12	1	
Dynamo Dresden	Totals		74	7	0	0	0	0	74	7	—
Career totals			395	47	10	1	2	0	407	48	—

- 1.Includes promotion/relegation playoff.
