= Oliver Fink =

German footballer

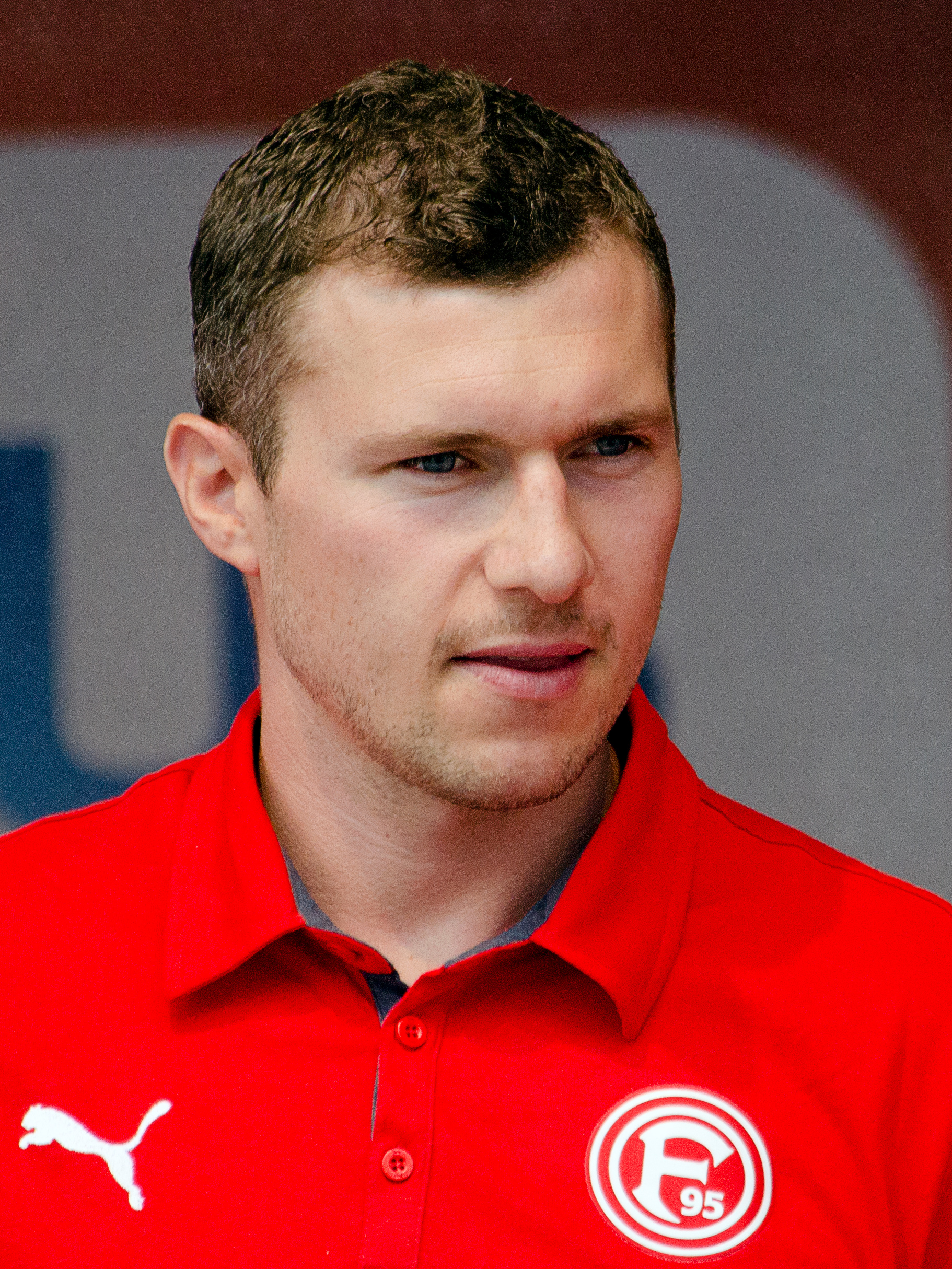
- Fink with Fortuna Düsseldorf in 2014

Personal information
- Date of birth: 6 June 1982 (age 44)
- Place of birth: Hirschau, West Germany
- Height: 1.87 m (6 ft 2 in)
- Position: Midfielder

Youth career
- –1997: 1. FC Schlicht
- 1997–1998: 1. FC Schwandorf
- 1998–2002: SG Post/Süd Regensburg

Senior career*
Years	Team	Apps	(Gls)
2002–2004	Jahn Regensburg II	15	(0)
2004	Jahn Regensburg	18	(1)
2005–2007	Wacker Burghausen	66	(3)
2007–2009	SpVgg Unterhaching	67	(5)
2009–2020	Fortuna Düsseldorf	257	(21)
2020–2022	Fortuna Düsseldorf II	57	(6)
- * Club domestic league appearances and goals

Oliver Fink (German pronunciation: [ˈɔlivɐ ˈfɪŋk, ˈoːl-]; born 6 June 1982) is a German former footballer.

== Personal life ==
He is the older brother of fellow footballer Tobias Fink.

== Career statistics ==
Club	Season	League			Cup		Other^{1}		Total	
Club	Season	Division	Apps	Goals	Apps	Goals	Apps	Goals	Apps	Goals
Jahn Regensburg	2003–04	2. Bundesliga	18	1	0	0	—		18	1
Jahn Regensburg	2004–05	Regionalliga Süd	15	0	1	0	—		16	0
Jahn Regensburg	Totals		33	1	1	0	—		34	1
Wacker Burghausen	2004–05	2. Bundesliga	18	2	0	0	—		18	2
Wacker Burghausen	2005–06	2. Bundesliga	30	1	1	0	—		31	1
Wacker Burghausen	2006–07	2. Bundesliga	18	0	1	0	—		19	0
Wacker Burghausen	Totals		66	3	2	0	—		68	3
SpVgg Unterhaching	2007–08	Regionalliga Süd	33	4	1	0	—		34	4
SpVgg Unterhaching	2008–09	3. Liga	34	1	1	0	—		35	1
SpVgg Unterhaching	Totals		67	5	2	0	—		69	5
Fortuna Düsseldorf	2009–10	2. Bundesliga	33	2	1	1	—		34	3
Fortuna Düsseldorf	2010–11	2. Bundesliga	31	3	0	0	—		31	3
Fortuna Düsseldorf	2011–12	2. Bundesliga	31	4	3	1	2	0	36	5
Fortuna Düsseldorf	2012–13	Bundesliga	26	3	3	0	—		29	3
Fortuna Düsseldorf	2013–14	2. Bundesliga	27	1	0	0	—		27	1
Fortuna Düsseldorf	2014–15	2. Bundesliga	12	2	0	0	—		12	2
Fortuna Düsseldorf	2015–16	2. Bundesliga	20	2	1	0	—		21	2
Fortuna Düsseldorf	2016–17	2. Bundesliga	23	1	1	0	—		24	1
Fortuna Düsseldorf	2017–18	2. Bundesliga	22	0	2	1	—		24	1
Fortuna Düsseldorf	2018–19	Bundesliga	18	3	1	0	—		19	3
Fortuna Düsseldorf	2019–20	Bundesliga	14	0	2	0	—		16	0
Fortuna Düsseldorf	Totals		257	21	14	3	2	0	273	24
Fortuna Düsseldorf II	2020–21	Regionalliga West	28	4	—		—		28	4
Fortuna Düsseldorf II	2021–22	Regionalliga West	29	3	—		—		29	3
Fortuna Düsseldorf II	Totals		57	7	0	0	0	0	57	7
Career totals			480	37	19	3	2	0	501	40

- 1.Includes Promotion playoff.
