= Florian Pflügler =

German footballer

Personal information
- Date of birth: 10 March 1992 (age 34)
- Place of birth: Freising, Germany
- Height: 1.85 m (6 ft 1 in)
- Position: Centre back

Youth career
- –2010: Bayern Munich

Senior career*
Years	Team	Apps	(Gls)
2010–2011	Bayern Munich II	1	(0)
2011–2013	TSV 1860 Rosenheim	52	(6)
2013–2014	Wacker Burghausen II	2	(1)
2013–2014	Wacker Burghausen	29	(2)
2014–2016	SV Elversberg II	7	(0)
2014–2016	SV Elversberg	14	(0)
2016–2017	TSV Buchbach	42	(7)
2017–2019	VfR Garching	54	(4)
- * Club domestic league appearances and goals as of 21:04, 30 July 2019 (UTC)

Florian Pflügler (born 10 March 1992) is a German footballer.
