= Jens Langeneke =

German footballer (born 1977)

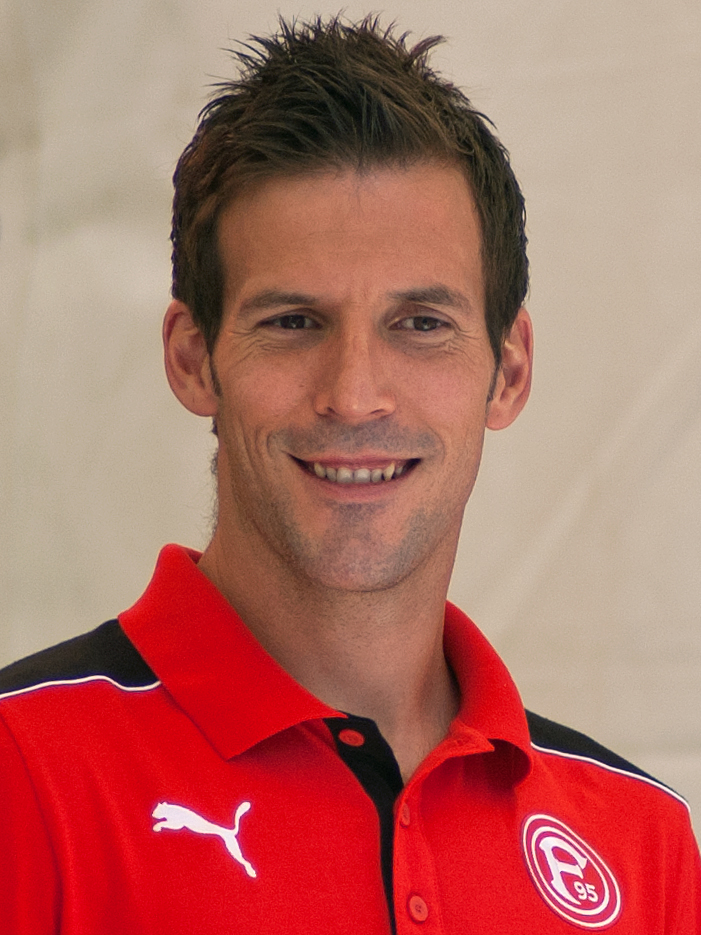
- Langeneke in 2012

Personal information
- Date of birth: 29 March 1977 (age 49)
- Place of birth: Lippstadt, West Germany
- Height: 1.85 m (6 ft 1 in)
- Position: Defender

Team information
- Current team: Fortuna Düsseldorf (interim manager)

Youth career
- –1995: SC Paderborn
- 1995–1997: Teutonia Lippstadt

Senior career*
Years	Team	Apps	(Gls)
1997–2000	SV Lippstadt		
2000–2003	Rot-Weiß Oberhausen	60	(2)
2003–2004	VfL Osnabrück	33	(0)
2004–2006	Rot Weiss Ahlen	53	(1)
2006–2013	Fortuna Düsseldorf	202	(32)
2013–2015	Fortuna Düsseldorf II	57	(2)
Total		405	(37)

Managerial career
- 2026–: Fortuna Düsseldorf (interim)
- * Club domestic league appearances and goals

Jens Langeneke (born 29 March 1977) is a German former professional footballer who played as a defender. He is the interim manager of 3. Liga club Fortuna Düsseldorf.
