= 2014–15 Hamburger SV season =

Hamburger SV
2014–15 season
- President: Carl-Edgar Jarchow
- Manager: Mirko Slomka (until 15 September); Josef Zinnbauer (16 September–22 March); Peter Knäbel (interim) (22 March–15 April); Bruno Labbadia (since 15 April)
- Stadium: Imtech Arena
- Bundesliga: 16th (win in relegation play-offs)
- DFB-Pokal: Round 2
Home colours	Away colours	Third colours

The 2014–15 Hamburger SV season was the 127th season in the club's football history. In 2014–15, the club played in the Bundesliga, the top tier of German football. It was the club's 52nd consecutive season in this league, being the only club to have played every season in the Bundesliga since its introduction in 1963.

== First team squad ==
As of March 2015, according to the official website.
Note: Flags indicate national team as defined under FIFA eligibility rules; some limited exceptions apply. Players may hold more than one non-FIFA nationality.

No.	Pos.	Nation	Player
1	GK	CZE	Jaroslav Drobný
2	DF	GER	Dennis Diekmeier
3	DF	BRA	Cléber
4	DF	GER	Heiko Westermann (vice-captain)
5	DF	SUI	Johan Djourou (vice-captain)
7	DF	GER	Marcell Jansen (vice-captain)
8	FW	CRO	Ivica Olić
9	MF	GER	Maximilian Beister
10	FW	GER	Pierre-Michel Lasogga
11	MF	CRO	Ivo Iličević
15	GK	GER	René Adler
16	FW	LAT	Artjoms Rudņevs
17	MF	HUN	Zoltán Stieber
18	MF	GER	Lewis Holtby (on loan from Tottenham Hotspur)
19	MF	CZE	Petr Jiráček
20	MF	CHI	Marcelo Díaz

No.	Pos.	Nation	Player
21	MF	SUI	Valon Behrami
22	DF	GER	Matthias Ostrzolek
23	MF	NED	Rafael van der Vaart (captain)
24	MF	GER	Matti Steinmann (also as Team II)
25	MF	FRA	Mohamed Gouaida (also as Team II)
26	FW	GER	Philipp Müller (also as Team II)
27	MF	GER	Nicolai Müller
28	MF	GER	Sven Mende
30	GK	GER	Alexander Brunst-Zöllner (also as Team II)
31	DF	MOZ	Ronny Marcos (also as Team II)
32	DF	SRB	Slobodan Rajković
33	DF	GER	Gideon Jung (also as Team II)
35	MF	TUR	Tolcay Ciğerci
37	MF	USA	Julian Green (on loan from Bayern Munich)
39	DF	GER	Ashton Götz (also as Team II)
40	MF	SRB	Gojko Kačar
41	FW	GER	Abdullah Bidav (also as Team II)

== Out on loan ==
Note: Flags indicate national team as defined under FIFA eligibility rules; some limited exceptions apply. Players may hold more than one non-FIFA nationality.

No.	Pos.	Nation	Player
—	DF	GER	Lasse Sobiech (on loan to FC St. Pauli until 30 June 2015)
—	DF	GER	Jonathan Tah (on loan to Fortuna Düsseldorf until 30 June 2015)
—	MF	TUR	Kerem Demirbay (on loan to 1. FC Kaiserslautern until 30 June 2015)
—	FW	CMR	Jacques Zoua (on loan to Kayseri Erciyesspor until 30 June 2015)

== Transfers ==
=== In ===
Note: Flags indicate national team as defined under FIFA eligibility rules; some limited exceptions apply. Players may hold more than one non-FIFA nationality.

No.	Pos.	Nation	Player
3	DF	BRA	Cléber (from Corinthians)
5	DF	SUI	Johan Djourou (from Arsenal)
10	FW	GER	Pierre-Michel Lasogga (from Hertha BSC)
17	MF	HUN	Zoltán Stieber (from Greuther Fürth)
21	MF	SUI	Valon Behrami (from Napoli)
22	DF	GER	Matthias Ostrzolek (from FC Augsburg)
27	MF	GER	Nicolai Müller (from Mainz 05)

No.	Pos.	Nation	Player
33	DF	GER	Gideon Jung (from Rot-Weiß Oberhausen)
18	MF	GER	Lewis Holtby (on loan from Tottenham Hotspur)
37	MF	USA	Julian Green (on loan from Bayern Munich)
8	FW	CRO	Ivica Olić (from VfL Wolfsburg in winter)
20	MF	CHI	Marcelo Díaz (from Basel in winter)
28	MF	GER	Sven Mende (promoted from Team II)
35	MF	TUR	Tolcay Ciğerci (promoted from Team II)

=== Out ===
Note: Flags indicate national team as defined under FIFA eligibility rules; some limited exceptions apply. Players may hold more than one non-FIFA nationality.

No.	Pos.	Nation	Player
—	DF	ENG	Michael Mancienne (to Nottingham Forest)
—	DF	GER	Dennis Aogo (to Schalke 04)
—	MF	TUR	Hakan Çalhanoğlu (to Bayer Leverkusen)
—	MF	CRO	Milan Badelj (to Fiorentina)
—	MF	NOR	Per Ciljan Skjelbred (to Hertha BSC)

No.	Pos.	Nation	Player
—	MF	GER	Robert Tesche (to Nottingham Forest)
—	MF	VEN	Tomás Rincón (to Genoa)
—	FW	GER	Zhi-Gin Lam (to Greuther Fürth)
8	MF	GER	Tolgay Arslan (to Beşiktaş in winter)
34	FW	MKD	Valmir Nafiu (to APOEL in winter)

== Competitions ==
=== Bundesliga ===
==== League table ====
Pos	Team	Pld	W	D	L	GF	GA	GD	Pts	Qualification or relegation
14	VfB Stuttgart	34	9	9	16	42	60	−18	36	
15	Hertha BSC	34	9	8	17	36	52	−16	35	
16	Hamburger SV (O)	34	9	8	17	25	50	−25	35	Qualification for the relegation play-offs
17	SC Freiburg (R)	34	7	13	14	36	47	−11	34	Relegation to 2. Bundesliga
18	SC Paderborn (R)	34	7	10	17	31	65	−34	31	Relegation to 2. Bundesliga

Source: DFB
Rules for classification: 1) points; 2) goal difference; 3) number of goals scored
(O) Play-off winners; (R) Relegated

==== Results summary ====
Overall								Home						Away					
Pld	W	D	L	GF	GA	GD	Pts	W	D	L	GF	GA	GD	W	D	L	GF	GA	GD
32	8	8	16	22	48	−26	32	5	5	6	14	18	−4	3	3	10	8	30	−22

Last updated: 8 May 2015.
Source: Competitive matches

==== Results by round ====
Round	1	2	3	4	5	6	7	8	9	10	11	12	13	14	15	16	17	18	19	20	21	22	23	24	25	26	27	28	29	30	31	32	33	34
Ground	A	H	A	H	A	H	A	H	A	H	A	H	A	H	A	H	A	H	A	H	A	H	A	H	A	H	A	H	A	H	A	H	A	H
Result	D	L	L	D	L	L	W	D	L	W	L	W	L	W	D	L	D	L	W	W	L	D	L	D	L	L	L	L	L	W	W	D	L	W
Position	12	17	18	17	18	18	17	16	16	16	16	14	14	14	14	14	14	16	13	12	13	14	15	15	15	16	16	18	18	16	14	14	17	16

Updated to match(es) played on 20 December 2014. Source: Competitive matches
A = Away; H = Home; W = Win; D = Draw; L = Loss

==== Matches ====
23 September 2014 1	1. FC Köln	0–0	Hamburger SV	Cologne
15:30 CEST (UTC+02:00)	Lehmann (yellow card) 56'; Risse (yellow card) 79'	Report	Djourou (yellow card) 72'; Van der Vaart (yellow card) 79'	Stadium: RheinEnergieStadion; Attendance: 50,000; Referee: Wolfgang Stark

30 August 2014 2	Hamburger SV	0–3	SC Paderborn	Hamburg
15:30 CEST (UTC+02:00)		Report	Kachunga 29'; Vrančić 68'; Stoppelkamp 87'	Stadium: Volksparkstadion; Attendance: 54,553; Referee: Bastian Dankert

14 August 2014 3	Hannover 96	2–0	Hamburger SV	Hanover
17:30 CEST (UTC+02:00)	Andreasen 13', (yellow card) 39'; Sobiech 24'; Bittencourt (yellow card) 45'; Marcelo (yellow card) 69'	Report	Holtby (yellow card) 26'; Diekmeier (yellow card) 73'; Jiráček (yellow card) 89'	Stadium: Niedersachsenstadion; Attendance: 49,000; Referee: Markus Schmidt

20 September 2014 4	Hamburger SV	0–0	Bayern Munich	Hamburg
15:30 CEST (UTC+02:00)	Arslan (yellow card) 45'; Müller (yellow card) 59'; Behrami (yellow card) 82'; Drobný (yellow card) 90+1'	Report	Neuer (yellow card) 90+2'; Højbjerg (yellow card) 90+4'	Stadium: Volksparkstadion; Attendance: 57,000; Referee: Christian Dingert

24 September 2014 5	Borussia Mönchengladbach	1–0	Hamburger SV	Mönchengladbach
20:00 CEST (UTC+02:00)	Kramer (yellow card) 19'; Kruse 25'	Report	Diekmeier (yellow card) 41'	Stadium: Borussia-Park; Attendance: 44,175; Referee: Deniz Aytekin

28 September 2014 6	Hamburger SV	1–2	Eintracht Frankfurt	Hamburg
18:30 CEST (UTC+02:00)	Behrami (yellow card) 20'; Müller 58'; Jiráček (yellow card) 89'	Report	Medojević (yellow card) 25'; Aigner (yellow card) 38'; Seferovic 44'; Piazon 90'	Stadium: Volksparkstadion; Attendance: 47,643; Referee: Florian Meyer

4 October 2014 7	Borussia Dortmund	0–1	Hamburger SV	Dortmund
15:30 CEST (UTC+02:00)	Papastathopoulos (yellow card) 20'; Jojić (yellow card) 62'	Report	Holtby (yellow card) 15'; Lasogga 35'; Müller (yellow card) 51'; Drobný (yellow card) 61'; Ostrzolek (yellow card) 67'	Stadium: Westfalenstadion; Attendance: 80,667; Referee: Felix Zwayer

19 October 2014 8	Hamburger SV	1–1	1899 Hoffenheim	Hamburg
15:30 CEST (UTC+02:00)	Lasogga 34'; Arslan (yellow card) 37'	Report	Modeste 15', (yellow card) 49'; Volland (yellow card) 45'; Rudy (yellow card) 77'	Stadium: Volksparkstadion; Attendance: 49,003; Referee: Peter Sippel

25 October 2014 9	Hertha BSC	3–0	Hamburger SV	Berlin
15:30 CEST (UTC+02:00)	Ben-Hatira 59', 85'; Heitinga 65'	Summary	Müller (yellow card) 53'; Van der Vaart (yellow card) 57'	Stadium: Olypiastadion; Attendance: 58,768; Referee: Thorsten Kinhöfer

1 November 2014 10	Hamburger SV	1–0	Bayer Leverkusen	Hamburg
15:30 CET (UTC+01:00)	Holtby (yellow card) 5'; Van der Vaart 26' (pen.), (yellow card) 35'; Behrami (yellow card) 41'; Drobný (yellow card) 45+2'; Diekmeier (yellow card) 45+5'; Müller (yellow card) 52'	Report	Spahić (yellow card) 28'; Donati (yellow card) 45+5'; Toprak (yellow card) 88'	Stadium: Volksparkstadion; Attendance: 52,990; Referee: Florian Meyer

9 November 2014 11	VfL Wolfsburg	2–0	Hamburger SV	Wolfsburg
15:30 CET (UTC+01:00)	Olić 27'; Naldo (yellow card) 62'; Hunt 63', (yellow card) 66'	Report	Diekmeier (yellow card) 18'; Ostrzolek (yellow card) 21'; Lasogga (yellow card) 45'	Stadium: Volkswagen Arena; Attendance: 30,000; Referee: Knut Kircher

23 November 2014 12	Hamburger SV	2–0	Werder Bremen	Hamburg
15:30 CET (UTC+01:00)	Diekmeier (yellow card) 32'; Westermann (yellow card) 37'; Van der Vaart (yellow card) 62'; Ostrzolek (yellow card) 80'; Rudņevs 84'; Wolf 90+3' (o.g.)	Report	García (yellow card) 20'; Fritz (yellow card) 72' (yellow-red card) 89'; Makiadi (yellow card) 89'; Bartels (yellow card) 90+5'	Stadium: Volksparkstadion; Attendance: 57,000; Referee: Felix Zwayer

29 November 2014 13	FC Augsburg	3–1	Hamburger SV	Augsburg
15:30 CET (UTC+01:00)	Altıntop 50'; Bobadilla 62'; Verhaegh 70' (pen.); Rahman (yellow card) 89'	Report	Van der Vaart 45+1'; Ostrzolek (yellow card) 49'; Götz (yellow card) 69'; Cléber (yellow card) 70'; Green (yellow card) 90+1'	Stadium: SGL arena Attendance: 30,321; Referee: Jochen Drees

7 December 2014 14	Hamburger SV	2–1	Mainz 05	Hamburg
15:30 CET (UTC+01:00)	Cléber 32'; Van der Vaart 54' (pen.); Rudņevs (yellow card) 78'	Report	Okazaki 89'	Stadium: Volksparkstadion; Attendance: 45,968; Referee: Sascha Stegemann

13 December 2014 15	SC Freiburg	0–0	Hamburger SV	Freiburg im Breisgau
15:30 CET (UTC+01:00)	Torrejón (yellow card) 39'; Günter (yellow card) 53'	Report	Cléber (yellow card) 54'; Behrami (yellow card) 68'	Stadium: Dreisamstadion; Attendance: 24,000; Referee: Wolfgang Stark

16 December 2014 16	Hamburger SV	0–1	VfB Stuttgart	Hamburg
20:00 CET (UTC+01:00)	Van der Vaart (yellow card) 66'	Report	Klein 42'; Niedermeier (red card) 53'; Harnik (yellow card) 66'; Hloušek (yellow card) 77'	Stadium: Volksparkstadion; Attendance: 48,223; Referee: Felix Brych

20 December 2014 17	Schalke 04	0–0	Hamburger SV	Gelsenkirchen
15:30 CET (UTC+01:00)	Höger (yellow card) 69'	Report	Behrami (yellow card) 42'; Cléber (yellow card) 81'	Stadium: Veltins-Arena; Attendance: 61,973; Referee: Markus Schmidt

31 January 2015 18	Hamburger SV	0–2	1. FC Köln	Hamburg
15:30 CET (UTC+01:00)	Van der Vaart (yellow card) 16'; Rajković (yellow card) 62'; Djourou (yellow card) 82'	Report	Peszko (yellow card) 16'; Risse 62', 78'	Stadium: Volksparkstadion; Attendance: 56,053; Referee: Wolfgang Stark

4 February 2015 19	SC Paderborn	0–3	Hamburger SV	Paderborn
20:00 CET (UTC+01:00)	Ziegler (yellow card) 1'	Report	Van der Vaart 2' (pen.); Stieber (yellow card) 15' (goal) 90+1'; Jiráček (yellow card) 31'; Jansen 72'	Stadium: Benteler Arena; Attendance: 15,000; Referee: Peter Gagelmann

7 February 2015 20	Hamburger SV	2–1	Hannover 96	Hamburg
18:30 CET (UTC+01:00)	Marcelo 26' (o.g.); Jansen 50', (yellow card) 90'	Report	Sobiech 66'	Stadium: Volksparkstadion; Attendance: 51,779; Referee: Manuel Gräfe

14 February 2015 21	Bayern Munich	8–0	Hamburger SV	Munich
15:30 CET (UTC+01:00)	Müller 21' (pen.), 55'; Götze 23', 88'; Robben 36', 47'; Lewandowski 56'; Ribéry 69'	Report	Van der Vaart (yellow card) 29'	Stadium: Allianz Arena; Attendance: 75,000; Referee: Michael Weiner

22 February 2015 22	Hamburger SV	1–1	Borussia Mönchengladbach	Hamburg
15:30 CET (UTC+01:00)	Djourou (yellow card) 39'; Kačar (yellow card) 49'; Stieber 73'; Jiráček (yellow card) 90+3'	Report	Traoré (yellow card) 9'; Jantschke (yellow card) 90'; Kruse (yellow card) 90'; Hrgota 90+2'	Stadium: Volksparkstadion; Attendance: 52,105; Referee: Felix Zwayer

28 February 2015 23	Eintracht Frankfurt	2–1	Hamburger SV	Frankfurt
18:30 CET (UTC+01:00)	Meier 12' (pen.), 54'; Madlung (yellow card) 31'; Piazon (yellow card) 88'	Report	Stieber 45+2'; Ostrzolek (yellow card) 53' (yellow-red card) 64'; Drobný (yellow card) 74'; Gouaida (yellow card) 82'; Djourou (yellow card) 90+2'	Stadium: Commerzbank-Arena; Attendance: 50,500; Referee: Florian Meyer

7 March 2015 24	Hamburger SV	0–0	Borussia Dortmund	Hamburg
15:30 CET (UTC+01:00)	Behrami (yellow card) 31'; Müller (yellow card) 41'; Diekmeier (yellow card) 67'; Cléber (yellow card) 73'; Van der Vaart (yellow card) 83'	Report	Mkhitaryan (yellow card) 63'; Subotić (yellow card) 83'	Stadium: Volksparkstadion; Attendance: 57,000; Referee: Peter Gagelmann

14 March 2015 25	1899 Hoffenheim	3–0	Hamburger SV	Sinsheim
15:30 CET (UTC+01:00)	Polanski 22' (pen.), 81'; Schwegler (yellow card) 56'; Rudy 87'	Report	Drobný (red card) 19'; Iličević (yellow card) 75'; Jiráček (yellow card) 81'	Stadium: Rhein-Neckar Arena; Attendance: 30,150; Referee: Günter Perl

20 March 2015 26	Hamburger SV	0–1	Hertha BSC	Hamburg
20:30 CET (UTC+01:00)	Behrami (yellow card) 66'; Cléber (yellow card) 69' (yellow-red card) 81'; Holtby (yellow card) 90+2'	Report	Langkamp (yellow card) 18', (goal) 84'	Stadium: Volksparkstadion; Attendance: 53,640; Referee: Christian Dingert

4 April 2015 27	Bayer Leverkusen	4–0	Hamburger SV	Leverkusen
15:30 CEST (UTC+02:00)	Castro 7', 63'; Toprak (yellow card) 21'; Kießling 44', 56', (yellow card) 50'; Papadopoulos (yellow card) 77'	Report	Westermann (yellow card) 25'; Diekmeier (yellow card) 42'	Stadium: BayArena; Attendance: 30,210; Referee: Manuel Gräfe

11 April 2015 28	Hamburger SV	0–2	VfL Wolfsburg	Hamburg
18:30 CEST (UTC+02:00)	Díaz (yellow card) 44'; Olić (yellow card) 57'; Müller (yellow card) 72'; Djourou (yellow card) 85' (yellow-red card) 88'	Report	Guilavogui 10'; Arnold (yellow card) 71'; Caligiuri 73'	Stadium: Volksparkstadion; Attendance: 57,000; Referee: Felix Zwayer

19 April 2015 29	Werder Bremen	1–0	Hamburger SV	Bremen
15:30 CEST (UTC+02:00)	Di Santo 84' (pen.); Öztunalı (yellow card) 90+4'	Report	Westermann (yellow card) 36'; Behrami (red card) 82'; Müller (yellow card) 84'; Holtby (yellow card) 90+2'	Stadium: Weserstadion; Attendance: 42,100; Referee: Wolfgang Stark

25 April 2015 30	Hamburger SV	3–2	FC Augsburg	Hamburg
15:30 CEST (UTC+02:00)	Olić 11'; Lasogga 19', 71', (yellow card) 75'; Van der Vaart (yellow card) 26'; Kačar (yellow card) 67'	Report	Bobadilla 25'; Werner 69'; Ji (yellow card) 78'	Stadium: Volksparkstadion; Attendance: 51,321; Referee: Tobias Welz

3 May 2015 31	Mainz 05	1–2	Hamburger SV	Mainz
15:30 CEST (UTC+02:00)	Bungert (yellow card) 46'; Baumgartlinger (yellow card) 53'; Mallı 76'; De Blasis (yellow card) 80'; Brosinski (red card) 89'; Allagui (yellow card) 90+2'	Report	Baumgartlinger 37' (o.g.); Olić (yellow card) 50'; Kačar (yellow card) 81', (goal) 87'	Stadium: Coface Arena; Attendance: 34,000; Referee: Peter Sippel

8 May 2015 32	Hamburger SV	1–1	SC Freiburg	Hamburg
20:30 CEST (UTC+02:00)	Kačar 90'	Report	Mehmedi 25'; Kempf (yellow card) 86'	Stadium: Volksparkstadion; Attendance: 57,000; Referee: Knut Kircher

16 May 2015 33	VfB Stuttgart	2–1	Hamburger SV	Stuttgart
15:30 CEST (UTC+02:00)	Gentner 27'; Harnik 35'; Didavi (yellow card) 69'	Report	Kačar 12', (yellow card) 69'; Adler (yellow card) 56'; Olić (yellow card) 58'; Van der Vaart (yellow card) 90+3'; Westermann (yellow card) 90+4'	Stadium: Mercedes-Benz Arena; Attendance: 60,000; Referee: Manuel Gräfe

23 May 2015 34	Hamburger SV	2–0	Schalke 04	Hamburg
15:30 CEST (UTC+02:00)	Díaz (yellow card) 39'; Olić 49'; Rajković 58'	Report	Kolašinac (yellow card) 26'; Höger (yellow card) 66'	Stadium: Volksparkstadion; Attendance: 57,000; Referee: Tobias Welz

==== Relegation play-offs ====
28 May 2015 First leg	Hamburger SV	1–1	Karlsruher SC	Hamburg
20:30 CEST (UTC+02:00)	Westermann (yellow card) 26'; Holtby (yellow card) 59'; Iličević 73'; Diekmeier (yellow card) 83'; Kačar (yellow card) 83'	Report	Hennings 4'; Valentini (yellow card) 13'; Peitz (yellow card) 78'	Stadium: Volksparkstadion; Attendance: 56,615; Referee: Deniz Aytekin

1 June 2015 Second leg	Karlsruher SC	1–2 (a.e.t.) (2–3 agg.)	Hamburger SV	Karlsruhe
19:00 CEST (UTC+02:00)	Yabo 78'; Krebs (yellow card) 87'; Meffert (yellow card) 90'; Gulde (yellow card) 90+2'; Gordon (yellow card) 118'; Nazarov (yellow card) 120+1'	Report	Van der Vaart (yellow card) 48'; Díaz (yellow card) 55', (goal) 90+1'; Rajković (yellow card) 63'; Beister (yellow card) 90+2'; Cléber (yellow card) 101'; Müller 115'; Jiráček (yellow card) 115'	Stadium: Wildparkstadion; Attendance: 27,986; Referee: Manuel Gräfe
Note: Hamburger SV won on aggregate to secure a spot in the 2015–16 Bundesliga.

=== DFB-Pokal ===
18 August 2014 Round 1	Energie Cottbus	2–2 (a.e.t.) (1–4 p)	Hamburger SV	Cottbus
18:30 CEST (UTC+02:00)	Zeitz 10' (pen.), (yellow card) 60'; Mimbala (yellow card) 35'; Holz (yellow card) 44'; Michel (yellow card) 54', (goal) 105'; Kleindienst (yellow card) 102'	Report	Adler (yellow card) 9'; Iličević (yellow card) 14'; Djourou (yellow card) 49'; Westermann 70'; Van der Vaart 96'	Stadium: Stadion der Freundschaft; Attendance: 16,184; Referee: Thorsten Kinhöfer
	Penalties
	Pawela (penalty missed); Holz (penalty scored); Michel (penalty missed)		(penalty scored) Van der Vaart; (penalty scored) Djourou; (penalty scored) Jansen; (penalty scored) Rudņevs

29 October 2014 Round 2	Hamburger SV	1–3	Bayern Munich	Hamburg
20:30 CET (UTC+01:00)	Götz (yellow card) 16'; Djourou (yellow card) 33'; Lasogga 85'	Report	Lewandowski 7'; Alaba 44'; Ribéry 55'	Stadium: Volksparkstadion; Attendance: 57,000; Referee: Marco Fritz
