= 2016–17 Hamburger SV season =

Hamburger SV
2016–17 season
- President: Carl-Edgar Jarchow
- Head coach: Bruno Labbadia (until 25 September); Markus Gisdol (from 26 September)
- Stadium: Volksparkstadion
- Bundesliga: 14th
- DFB-Pokal: Quarter-finals
- Top goalscorer: League: Michael Gregoritsch; Nicolai Müller; Bobby Wood (5 goals each); All: Bobby Wood (9 goals)
- Highest home attendance: 57,000
- Lowest home attendance: 44,445
- Average home league attendance: 52,341
- Biggest win: Halle 0–4 Hamburg
- Biggest defeat: Bayern 8–0 Hamburg
Home colours	Away colours	Third colours
- All statistics correct as of 27 May 2017.

The 2016–17 Hamburger SV season was the 129th season in the club's football history. In 2016–17 the club played in the Bundesliga, the top tier of German football. It was the club's 54th consecutive season in this league, being the only club to have played every season in the Bundesliga since its introduction in 1963.

== Players ==
=== First-team squad ===
Squad at end of season

Note: Flags indicate national team as defined under FIFA eligibility rules; some limited exceptions apply. Players may hold more than one non-FIFA nationality.

No.	Pos.	Nation	Player
1	GK	GER	René Adler (Vice-captain)
2	DF	GER	Dennis Diekmeier
5	DF	SUI	Johan Djourou
6	DF	BRA	Douglas Santos
7	FW	USA	Bobby Wood
8	MF	GER	Lewis Holtby
9	DF	GRE	Kyriakos Papadopoulos (on loan from Bayer Leverkusen)
10	FW	GER	Pierre-Michel Lasogga
11	FW	AUT	Michael Gregoritsch
12	MF	BRA	Walace
13	DF	ALB	Mërgim Mavraj
14	MF	GER	Aaron Hunt
15	FW	GER	Luca Waldschmidt
16	MF	SUI	Vasilije Janjičić
17	MF	SRB	Filip Kostić
18	FW	GAM	Bakery Jatta

No.	Pos.	Nation	Player
19	MF	GER	Dren Feka
20	MF	SWE	Albin Ekdal
21	MF	SWE	Nabil Bahoui
22	DF	GER	Matthias Ostrzolek
24	DF	JPN	Gōtoku Sakai (Captain)
25	FW	GER	Mats Köhlert
27	MF	GER	Nicolai Müller
28	DF	GER	Gideon Jung
30	GK	SUI	Andreas Hirzel
31	GK	GER	Christian Mathenia
32	MF	GER	Frank Ronstadt
34	MF	GER	Finn Porath
36	GK	GER	Tom Mickel
37	DF	KOR	Seo Young-jae
39	DF	GER	Ashton Götz

=== Left club during season ===
Note: Flags indicate national team as defined under FIFA eligibility rules; some limited exceptions apply. Players may hold more than one non-FIFA nationality.

No.	Pos.	Nation	Player
3	DF	BRA	Cléber Reis (to Santos)
4	DF	BIH	Emir Spahić (released)

No.	Pos.	Nation	Player
23	MF	CRO	Alen Halilović (on loan to Las Palmas)

== Competitions ==
Win Draw Loss

=== Overview ===
Competition	First match	Last match	Starting round	Final position	Record							
Competition	First match	Last match	Starting round	Final position	Pld	W	D	L	GF	GA	GD	Win %
Bundesliga	27 August 2016	20 May 2017	Matchday 1	14th	34	10	8	16	33	61	−28	29.41
DFB-Pokal	22 August 2016	1 March 2017	First round	Quarter-finals	4	3	0	1	8	2	+6	75.00
Total					38	13	8	17	41	63	−22	34.21

Last updated: 27 May 2017
Source: Competitions

=== Bundesliga ===
==== League table ====
Pos	Team	Pld	W	D	L	GF	GA	GD	Pts	Qualification or relegation
12	Bayer Leverkusen	34	11	8	15	53	55	−2	41	
13	FC Augsburg	34	9	11	14	35	51	−16	38	
14	Hamburger SV	34	10	8	16	33	61	−28	38	
15	Mainz 05	34	10	7	17	44	55	−11	37	
16	VfL Wolfsburg (O)	34	10	7	17	34	52	−18	37	Qualification for the relegation play-offs

Source: DFB
Rules for classification: 1) Points; 2) Goal difference; 3) Goals scored; 4) Head-to-head points; 5) Head-to-head goal difference; 6) Head-to-head away goals scored; 7) Away goals scored; 8) Play-off.
(O) Play-off winners

==== Results summary ====
Overall								Home						Away					
Pld	W	D	L	GF	GA	GD	Pts	W	D	L	GF	GA	GD	W	D	L	GF	GA	GD
34	10	8	16	33	61	−28	38	8	4	5	21	25	−4	2	4	11	12	36	−24

Last updated: 27 May 2017.
Source: Bundesliga

==== Results by round ====
Round	1	2	3	4	5	6	7	8	9	10	11	12	13	14	15	16	17	18	19	20	21	22	23	24	25	26	27	28	29	30	31	32	33	34
Ground	H	A	H	A	H	A	A	H	A	H	A	H	A	H	A	H	A	A	H	A	H	A	H	H	A	H	A	H	A	H	A	H	A	H
Result	D	L	L	L	L	L	D	L	L	L	D	D	W	W	L	W	L	L	W	W	D	L	W	W	D	W	L	W	L	L	L	D	D	W
Position	10	15	16	16	16	18	17	18	18	18	18	18	17	16	17	16	16	17	16	15	15	16	16	16	16	14	14	13	14	15	16	16	16	14

Updated to match(es) played on 27 May 2017. Source: Bundesliga
A = Away; H = Home; W = Win; D = Draw; L = Loss

==== Matches ====
27 August 2016 1	Hamburger SV	1–1	FC Ingolstadt	Hamburg
15:30 CEST (UTC+2)	Wood 30'; Sakai (yellow card) 32'; Djourou (yellow card) 89'	Report	Suttner (yellow card) 7'; Morales (yellow card) 32'; Hinterseer 79'	Stadium: Volksparkstadion; Attendance: 50,107; Referee: Marco Fritz

10 September 2016 2	Bayer Leverkusen	3–1	Hamburger SV	Leverkusen
15:30 CEST (UTC+2)	Tah (yellow card) 71'; Pohjanpalo 79', 90+1', 90+4'; Kampl (yellow card) 90'	Report	Wood 58'; Hunt (yellow card) 83'	Stadium: BayArena; Attendance: 30,210; Referee: Tobias Welz

17 September 2016 3	Hamburger SV	0–4	RB Leipzig	Hamburg
15:30 CEST (UTC+2)	Sakai (yellow card) 8'; Spahić (yellow card) 13'; Djourou (yellow card) 51'; Adler (yellow card) 65'; Wood (yellow card) 70'	Report	Forsberg 66' (pen.); Werner 72', 77'; Compper (yellow card) 74'; Selke 90+2'	Stadium: Volksparkstadion; Attendance: 52,998; Referee: Robert Kampka

20 September 2016 4	SC Freiburg	1–0	Hamburger SV	Freiburg im Breisgau
20:00 CEST (UTC+2)	Frantz (yellow card) 33'; Petersen 70'	Report		Stadium: Schwarzwald-Stadion; Attendance: 24,000; Referee: Markus Schmidt

24 September 2016 5	Hamburger SV	0–1	Bayern Munich	Hamburg
15:30 CEST (UTC+2)	Douglas Santos (yellow card) 70'; Gregoritsch (yellow card) 90+2'	Report	Martínez (yellow card) 65'; Ribéry (yellow card) 73'; Kimmich (yellow card) 83', (goal) 88'	Stadium: Volksparkstadion; Attendance: 57,000; Referee: Felix Zwayer

1 October 2016 6	Hertha BSC	2–0	Hamburger SV	Berlin
15:30 CEST (UTC+2)	Plattenhardt (yellow card) 16'; Ibišević 29', 70' (pen.); Haraguchi (yellow card) 31'	Report	Douglas Santos (yellow card) 3'; Holtby (yellow card) 27'; Ekdal (yellow card) 32'; Müller (yellow card) 48'; Cléber (yellow card) 78'; Lasogga (yellow card) 90+2'	Stadium: Olympiastadion Berlin; Attendance: 57,656; Referee: Guido Winkmann

15 October 2016 7	Borussia Mönchengladbach	0–0	Hamburger SV	Mönchengladbach
15:30 CEST (UTC+2)	Stindl (yellow card) 45+1'; Kramer (yellow card) 47'	Report	Cléber (red card) 25'; Lasogga (yellow card) 39'; Spahić (yellow card) 48'; Diekmeier (yellow card) 61'; Kostić (yellow card) 69'	Stadium: BORUSSIA-PARK; Attendance: 53,636; Referee: Wolfgang Stark

21 October 2016 8	Hamburger SV	0–3	Eintracht Frankfurt	Hamburg
20:30 CEST (UTC+2)	Diekmeier (yellow card) 36' (yellow-red card) 57'	Report	Gaćinović (yellow card) 25'; Oczipka (yellow card) 30'; Holtby 35' (o.g.); Chandler (yellow card) 59'; Tarashaj 60'; Seferovic 69'; Fabián (yellow card) 82'	Stadium: Volksparkstadion; Attendance: 52,258; Referee: Günter Perl

30 October 2016 9	1. FC Köln	3–0	Hamburger SV	Cologne
17:30 CET (UTC+1)	Modeste (yellow card) 21', (goal) 61', 82', 86'; Höger (yellow card) 33'; Rudņevs (yellow card) 36'	Report	Götz (yellow card) 40'; Wood (red card) 58'	Stadium: RheinEnergieSTADION; Attendance: 50,000; Referee: Benjamin Brand

5 November 2016 10	Hamburger SV	2–5	Borussia Dortmund	Hamburg
15:30 CET (UTC+1)	Müller 55', 81'; Sakai (yellow card) 68'; Douglas Santos (yellow card) 85'	Report	Aubameyang 4', 23', 27', 48'; Dembélé 76'	Stadium: Volksparkstadion; Attendance: 57,000; Referee: Sascha Stegemann

20 November 2016 11	1899 Hoffenheim	2–2	Hamburger SV	Sinsheim
15:30 CET (UTC+1)	Bičakčić (yellow card) 40'; Wagner 45+1'; Zuber 49'	Report	Sakai (yellow card) 16'; Kostić 28'; Müller (yellow card) 42', (goal) 61'	Stadium: WIRSOL Rhein-Neckar-Arena; Attendance: 29,512; Referee: Robert Hartmann

26 November 2016 12	Hamburger SV	2–2	Werder Bremen	Hamburg
15:30 CET (UTC+1)	Gregoritsch 3', 28'; Djourou (yellow card) 72'; Müller (yellow card) 88'	Report	Petsos (yellow card) 11'; Bartels 14'; Moisander (yellow card) 39'; Gnabry 45'; Bargfrede (yellow card) 70'	Stadium: Volksparkstadion; Attendance: 55,237; Referee: Felix Brych

4 December 2016 13	Darmstadt 98	0–2	Hamburger SV	Darmstadt
15:30 CET (UTC+1)	Sulu (yellow card) 39'; Rosenthal (yellow card) 88'	Report	Gregoritsch 30'; Djourou (yellow card) 43'; Müller (yellow card) 59'; Ostrzolek (yellow card) 83', (goal) 90'; Diekmeier (yellow card) 90+1'	Stadium: Jonathan-Heimes-Stadion am Böllenfalltor; Attendance: 17,400; Referee: Guido Winkmann

10 December 2016 14	Hamburger SV	1–0	FC Augsburg	Hamburg
15:30 CET (UTC+1)	Holtby (red card) 44'; Djourou (yellow card) 62'; Kostić 68'	Report	Hinteregger (yellow card) 23'; Schmid (yellow card) 46'; Kohr (yellow card) 57' (yellow-red card) 66'; Stafylidis (yellow card) 74'	Stadium: Volksparkstadion; Attendance: 45,793; Referee: Daniel Siebert

17 December 2016 15	Mainz 05	3–1	Hamburger SV	Mainz
15:30 CET (UTC+1)	Latza 35', 56', 67', (yellow card) 68'; de Blasis (yellow card) 41'	Report	Wood 21'; Spahić (yellow card) 43'; Gregoritsch (yellow card) 53'; Ostrzolek (yellow card) 79'	Stadium: OPEL ARENA; Attendance: 30,179; Referee: Deniz Aytekin

20 December 2016 16	Hamburger SV	2–1	Schalke 04	Hamburg
20:00 CET (UTC+1)	Jung (yellow card) 41'; Müller 60'; Wood 82'; Mathenia (yellow card) 90'	Report	Meyer (yellow card) 26'; Schöpf (yellow card) 42'; Kehrer (yellow card) 75'; Bentaleb (yellow card) 78'; Avdijaj 89'	Stadium: Volksparkstadion; Attendance: 49,789; Referee: Jochen Drees

21 January 2017 17	VfL Wolfsburg	1–0	Hamburger SV	Wolfsburg
15:30 CET (UTC+1)	Benaglio (yellow card) 33'; Gómez 83'; Luiz Gustavo (yellow card) 85'	Report	Ekdal (yellow card) 28' (yellow-red card) 33'; Ostrzolek (yellow card) 37'	Stadium: VOLKSWAGEN ARENA; Attendance: 30,000; Referee: Felix Zwayer

28 January 2017 18	FC Ingolstadt	3–1	Hamburger SV	Ingolstadt
15:30 CET (UTC+1)	Groß 14'; Suttner 22'; Cohen 47' (pen.)	Report	Papadopoulos (yellow card) 44'; Sakai 63', (yellow card) 77'	Stadium: Audi Sportpark; Attendance: 14,549; Referee: Markus Schmidt

3 February 2017 19	Hamburger SV	1–0	Bayer Leverkusen	Hamburg
20:30 CET (UTC+1)	Papadopoulos 76'	Report	Bellarabi (yellow card) 38'; Kampl (yellow card) 69'; Wendell (yellow card) 79'	Stadium: Volksparkstadion; Attendance: 45,653; Referee: Jochen Drees

11 February 2017 20	RB Leipzig	0–3	Hamburger SV	Leipzig
15:30 CET (UTC+1)	Werner (yellow card) 10'; Orban (yellow card) 82'	Report	Papadopoulos 18', (yellow card) 55'; Walace 24'; Jung (yellow card) 86'; Hunt 90+3'	Stadium: Red Bull Arena; Attendance: 42,558; Referee: Sascha Stegemann

18 February 2017 21	Hamburger SV	2–2	SC Freiburg	Hamburg
18:30 CET (UTC+1)	Hunt 15', (yellow card) 68'; Gregoritsch 57'; Kostić (yellow card) 62'; Djourou (yellow card) 74'	Report	Philipp 23', (yellow card) 36'; Haberer (yellow card) 56'; Grifo 72'	Stadium: Volksparkstadion; Attendance: 49,405; Referee: Christian Dingert

25 February 2017 22	Bayern Munich	8–0	Hamburger SV	Munich
15:30 CET (UTC+1)	Vidal 17'; Lewandowski 24' (pen.), 42', 54'; Alaba 56'; Coman 65', 69'; Robben 87'	Report	Douglas Santos (yellow card) 37'	Stadium: Allianz Arena; Attendance: 75,000; Referee: Bastian Dankert

5 March 2017 23	Hamburger SV	1–0	Hertha BSC	Hamburg
17:30 CET (UTC+1)	Papadopoulos (yellow card) 55'; Ekdal 77'	Report	Stark (yellow card) 41'; Darida (yellow card) 64'	Stadium: Volksparkstadion; Attendance: 44,445; Referee: Felix Brych

12 March 2017 24	Hamburger SV	2–1	Borussia Mönchengladbach	Hamburg
17:30 CET (UTC+1)	Papadopoulos (yellow card) 22'; Kostić 36'; Wood 80'	Report	Christensen 23'; Strobl (yellow card) 37'; Herrmann (yellow card) 51'	Stadium: Volksparkstadion; Attendance: 52,501; Referee: Deniz Aytekin

18 March 2017 25	Eintracht Frankfurt	0–0	Hamburger SV	Frankfurt
18:30 CET (UTC+1)	Mascarell (yellow card) 83'	Report	Jung (yellow card) 68'	Stadium: Commerzbank-Arena; Attendance: 51,500; Referee: Benjamin Cortus

1 April 2017 26	Hamburger SV	2–1	1. FC Köln	Hamburg
15:30 CEST (UTC+2)	Müller 13'; Holtby (yellow card) 60', (goal) 90+1'; Walace (yellow card) 67'	Report	Jojić 25', (yellow card) 37'; Zoller (yellow card) 34'; Guirassy (yellow card) 77'	Stadium: Volksparkstadion; Attendance: 57,000; Referee: Daniel Siebert

4 April 2017 27	Borussia Dortmund	3–0	Hamburger SV	Dortmund
20:00 CEST (UTC+2)	Castro 13'; Ginter (yellow card) 29'; Kagawa 81'; Aubameyang 90+2'	Report	Ekdal (yellow card) 12'; Kostić (yellow card) 66'; Holtby (yellow card) 80'	Stadium: SIGNAL IDUNA PARK; Attendance: 81,360; Referee: Markus Schmidt

8 April 2017 28	Hamburger SV	2–1	1899 Hoffenheim	Hamburg
15:30 CEST (UTC+2)	Hunt 25', 75'; Kostić (yellow card) 40'; Walace (yellow card) 51'; Papadopoulos (yellow card) 68'; Diekmeier (yellow card) 82'	Report	Rudy (yellow card) 32'; Kramarić 35' (pen.), (yellow card) 36'; Zuber (yellow card) 62'; Hübner (yellow card) 82'	Stadium: Volksparkstadion; Attendance: 53,565; Referee: Felix Zwayer

16 April 2017 29	Werder Bremen	2–1	Hamburger SV	Bremen
15:30 CEST (UTC+2)	Junuzović (yellow card) 32'; Grillitsch (yellow card) 35'; Kruse 41'; Kainz 75'; Veljković (yellow card) 90+4'	Report	Gregoritsch 6'; Diekmeier (yellow card) 70'	Stadium: Weser-Stadion; Attendance: 42,100; Referee: Felix Brych

22 April 2017 30	Hamburger SV	1–2	Darmstadt 98	Hamburg
15:30 CEST (UTC+2)	Kostić (yellow card) 13'; Hunt (yellow card) 57'; Mavraj (yellow card) 81'; Holland 90+3' (o.g.)	Report	Sulu 51'; Platte 53'; Kamavuaka (yellow card) 57'; Banggaard (yellow card) 75'	Stadium: Volksparkstadion; Attendance: 56,132; Referee: Sascha Stegemann

30 April 2017 31	FC Augsburg	4–0	Hamburger SV	Augsburg
15:30 CEST (UTC+2)	Altıntop 28', 42'; Baier (yellow card) 48'; Max 76'; Bobadilla 85'	Report	Mavraj (yellow card) 33'; Gregoritsch (yellow card) 44'; Ostrzolek (yellow card) 51'; Holtby (yellow card) 72'	Stadium: WWK ARENA; Attendance: 30,660; Referee: Manuel Gräfe

7 May 2017 32	Hamburger SV	0–0	Mainz 05	Hamburg
15:30 CEST (UTC+2)	Sakai (yellow card) 70'; Mavraj (yellow card) 80'	Report	Donati (yellow card) 78'	Stadium: Volksparkstadion; Attendance: 53,915; Referee: Daniel Siebert

13 May 2017 33	Schalke 04	1–1	Hamburger SV	Gelsenkirchen
15:30 CEST (UTC+2)	Nastasić (yellow card) 8'; Burgstaller 25'; Kolašinac (yellow card) 55'; Bentaleb (yellow card) 69'	Report	Diekmeier (yellow card) 49'; Lasogga 90+2'	Stadium: VELTINS-Arena; Attendance: 62,271; Referee: Markus Schmidt

20 May 2017 34	Hamburger SV	2–1	VfL Wolfsburg	Hamburg
15:30 CEST (UTC+2)	Sakai (yellow card) 25'; Kostić 32', (yellow card) 88'; Papadopoulos (yellow card) 80'; Waldschmidt 88'; Gregoritsch (yellow card) 90+5'	Report	Knoche 23'; Guilavogui (yellow card) 36'; Vieirinha (yellow card) 59'; Casteels (yellow card) 90+2'	Stadium: Volksparkstadion; Attendance: 57,000; Referee: Manuel Gräfe

=== DFB-Pokal ===
22 August 2016 First round	FSV Zwickau	0–1	Hamburger SV	Zwickau
18:30 CEST (UTC+2)	Wachsmuth (yellow card) 5'; Gebers (yellow card) 9'; Miatke (yellow card) 23'	Report	Müller (yellow card) 58'; Halilović 70'	Stadium: Stadion Zwickau; Attendance: 10,134; Referee: Robert Kempter

25 October 2016 Second round	Hallescher FC	0–4	Hamburger SV	Halle
20:45 CEST (UTC+2)	Pfeffer (yellow card) 18'	Report	Wood 8', 43'; Sakai (yellow card) 15'; Ostrzolek (yellow card) 45+2'; Adler (yellow card) 49'; Lasogga 57'; Cléber (yellow card) 75'; Waldschmidt 82'; Jung (yellow card) 85'	Stadium: ERDGAS Sportpark; Attendance: 14,004; Referee: Christian Dingert

7 February 2017 Round of 16	Hamburger SV	2–0	1. FC Köln	Hamburg
18:30 CET (UTC+1)	Jung 5'; Walace (yellow card) 51'; Kostić (yellow card) 53'; Wood 75'; Diekmeier (yellow card) 90+2'	Report	Rausch (yellow card) 58'	Stadium: Volksparkstadion; Attendance: 45,143; Referee: Günter Perl

1 March 2017 Quarter-finals	Hamburger SV	1–2	Borussia Mönchengladbach	Hamburg
18:40 CET (UTC+1)	Wood 90+2'	Report	Stindl 53' (pen.); Raffael 61' (pen.); Herrmann (yellow card) 83'	Stadium: Volksparkstadion; Attendance: 53,249; Referee: Marco Fritz
Note: The match was originally scheduled to start at 18:30, but was delayed 10 minutes due to a traffic jam around the stadium.

== Statistics ==
=== Appearances and goals ===
No.	Pos	Nat	Player	Total		Bundesliga		DFB-Pokal	
No.	Pos	Nat	Player	Apps	Goals	Apps	Goals	Apps	Goals
Goalkeepers
1	GK	(Germany) GER	René Adler	23	0	19	0	4	0
30	GK	(Switzerland) SUI	Andreas Hirzel	0	0	0	0	0	0
31	GK	(Germany) GER	Christian Mathenia	14	0	14	0	0	0
36	GK	(Germany) GER	Tom Mickel	1	0	1	0	0	0
Defenders
2	DF	(Germany) GER	Dennis Diekmeier	26	0	21+3	0	1+1	0
5	DF	(Switzerland) SUI	Johan Djourou	16	0	12+2	0	2	0
6	DF	(Brazil) BRA	Douglas Santos	22	0	19+1	0	2	0
9	DF	(Greece) GRE	Kyriakos Papadopoulos	17	2	15	2	1+1	0
13	DF	(Albania) ALB	Mërgim Mavraj	16	0	14	0	2	0
22	DF	(Germany) GER	Matthias Ostrzolek	27	1	22+1	1	3+1	0
24	DF	(Japan) JPN	Gōtoku Sakai	37	1	29+4	1	4	0
28	DF	(Germany) GER	Gideon Jung	33	1	26+3	0	4	1
37	DF	(South Korea) KOR	Seo Young-jae	0	0	0	0	0	0
39	DF	(Germany) GER	Ashton Götz	1	0	1	0	0	0
Midfielders
8	MF	(Germany) GER	Lewis Holtby	30	1	29	1	1	0
12	MF	(Brazil) BRA	Walace	11	1	9	1	1+1	0
14	MF	(Germany) GER	Aaron Hunt	26	4	14+8	4	3+1	0
16	MF	(Switzerland) SUI	Vasilije Janjičić	4	0	2+2	0	0	0
17	MF	(Serbia) SRB	Filip Kostić	35	4	29+2	4	3+1	0
19	MF	(Germany) GER	Dren Feka	0	0	0	0	0	0
20	MF	(Sweden) SWE	Albin Ekdal	23	1	13+8	1	2	0
21	MF	(Sweden) SWE	Nabil Bahoui	1	0	1	0	0	0
27	MF	(Germany) GER	Nicolai Müller	27	5	22+3	5	2	0
32	MF	(Germany) GER	Frank Ronstadt	0	0	0	0	0	0
34	MF	(Germany) GER	Finn Porath	1	0	0+1	0	0	0
Forwards
7	FW	(United States) USA	Bobby Wood	32	9	23+5	5	4	4
10	FW	(Germany) GER	Pierre-Michel Lasogga	22	2	5+15	1	1+1	1
11	FW	(Austria) AUT	Michael Gregoritsch	32	5	14+16	5	1+1	0
15	FW	(Germany) GER	Luca Waldschmidt	16	2	3+11	1	1+1	1
18	FW	(The Gambia) GAM	Bakery Jatta	6	0	1+5	0	0	0
25	FW	(Germany) GER	Mats Köhlert	0	0	0	0	0	0
Players transferred out during the season
3	DF	(Brazil) BRA	Cléber	7	0	5	0	2	0
4	DF	(Bosnia and Herzegovina) BIH	Emir Spahić	11	0	9+2	0	0	0
23	MF	(Croatia) CRO	Alen Halilović	7	1	1+5	0	0+1	1

Last updated: 20 May 2017
Source: Competitions

=== Goalscorers ===
Rank	No.	Pos	Nat	Name	Bundesliga	DFB-Pokal	Total
1	7	FW	(United States)	Bobby Wood	5	4	9
2	11	FW	(Austria)	Michael Gregoritsch	5	0	5
2	27	MF	(Germany)	Nicolai Müller	5	0	5
4	14	MF	(Germany)	Aaron Hunt	4	0	4
4	17	MF	(Serbia)	Filip Kostić	4	0	4
6	9	DF	(Greece)	Kyriakos Papadopoulos	2	0	2
6	10	FW	(Germany)	Pierre-Michel Lasogga	1	1	2
6	15	FW	(Germany)	Luca Waldschmidt	1	1	2
9	8	MF	(Germany)	Lewis Holtby	1	0	1
9	12	MF	(Brazil)	Walace	1	0	1
9	20	MF	(Sweden)	Albin Ekdal	1	0	1
9	22	DF	(Germany)	Matthias Ostrzolek	1	0	1
9	23	MF	(Croatia)	Alen Halilović	0	1	1
9	24	DF	(Japan)	Gōtoku Sakai	1	0	1
9	28	DF	(Germany)	Gideon Jung	1	0	1
Own goal					1	0	1
Totals					33	8	41

Last updated: 20 May 2017

=== Clean sheets ===
Rank	No.	Pos	Nat	Name	Bundesliga	DFB-Pokal	Total
1	1	GK	(Germany)	René Adler	5	3	8
2	31	GK	(Germany)	Christian Mathenia	3	0	3
Totals					7	3	10

Last updated: 7 May 2017

=== Disciplinary record ===
No.	Pos	Nat	Player	Bundesliga			DFB-Pokal			Total		
No.	Pos	Nat	Player	Yellow card	(yellow card) (yellow-red card)	Red card	Yellow card	(yellow card) (yellow-red card)	Red card	Yellow card	(yellow card) (yellow-red card)	Red card
1	GK	(Germany)	René Adler	1	0	0	1	0	0	2	0	0
2	DF	(Germany)	Dennis Diekmeier	5	1	0	0	0	0	5	1	0
3	DF	(Brazil)	Cléber	1	0	1	1	0	0	2	0	1
4	DF	(Bosnia and Herzegovina)	Emir Spahić	3	0	0	0	0	0	3	0	0
5	DF	(Switzerland)	Johan Djourou	6	0	0	0	0	0	6	0	0
6	DF	(Brazil)	Douglas Santos	4	0	0	0	0	0	4	0	0
7	FW	(United States)	Bobby Wood	1	0	1	0	0	0	1	0	1
8	MF	(Germany)	Lewis Holtby	4	0	1	0	0	0	4	0	1
9	DF	(Greece)	Kyriakos Papadopoulos	6	0	0	0	0	0	6	0	0
10	FW	(Germany)	Pierre-Michel Lasogga	2	0	0	0	0	0	2	0	0
11	FW	(Austria)	Michael Gregoritsch	4	0	0	0	0	0	4	0	0
12	MF	(Brazil)	Walace	2	0	0	1	0	0	3	0	0
13	DF	(Albania)	Mërgim Mavraj	3	0	0	0	0	0	3	0	0
14	MF	(Germany)	Aaron Hunt	3	0	0	0	0	0	3	0	0
17	MF	(Serbia)	Filip Kostić	6	0	0	1	0	0	7	0	0
20	MF	(Sweden)	Albin Ekdal	2	1	0	0	0	0	2	1	0
22	DF	(Germany)	Matthias Ostrzolek	4	0	0	1	0	0	5	0	0
24	DF	(Japan)	Gōtoku Sakai	7	0	0	1	0	0	8	0	0
27	MF	(Germany)	Nicolai Müller	4	0	0	1	0	0	5	0	0
28	DF	(Germany)	Gideon Jung	3	0	0	1	0	0	4	0	0
31	GK	(Germany)	Christian Mathenia	1	0	0	0	0	0	1	0	0
39	DF	(Germany)	Ashton Götz	1	0	0	0	0	0	1	0	0
Totals				73	2	3	8	0	0	81	2	3

Last updated: 20 May 2017
