= Matthias Ostrzolek =

Polish-German footballer

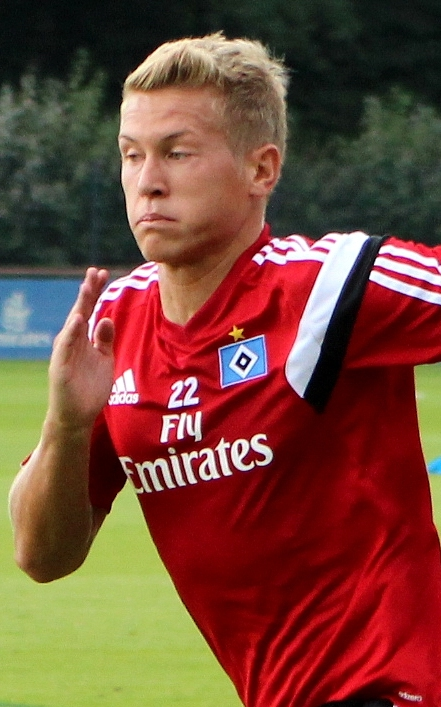
- Ostrzolek in training with Hamburger SV in 2014

Personal information
- Date of birth: 5 June 1990 (age 36)
- Place of birth: Bochum, West Germany
- Height: 1.78 m (5 ft 10 in)
- Position: Left-back

Team information
- Current team: SV Wacker Burghausen (manager)

Youth career
- 1994–1997: WSV Bochum
- 1997–2009: VfL Bochum

Senior career*
Years	Team	Apps	(Gls)
2009–2011	VfL Bochum II	17	(1)
2010–2011	VfL Bochum	33	(0)
2012–2014	FC Augsburg	70	(0)
2014–2017	Hamburger SV	81	(1)
2017–2020	Hannover 96	53	(0)
2021–2022	Admira Wacker	37	(0)
2023	VfB Hallbergmoos	8	(1)
2023–2026	TSV Schwaben Augsburg	96	(0)
Total		395	(3)

International career
2007	Poland U17	2	(0)
2011–2013	Germany U21	8	(0)

Managerial career
- 2023: TSV Schwaben Augsburg (assistant)
- 2023–2026: TSV Schwaben Augsburg (player-manager)
- 2026–: SV Wacker Burghausen (manager)
- * Club domestic league appearances and goals

Matthias Ostrzolek (born 5 June 1990) is a former German professional football player who played as a left-back. He is currently the manager of Regionalliga Bayern club SV Wacker Burghausen.

== Early life ==
Ostrzolek's parents emigrated from the Polish region of Silesia and settled in Bochum. Ostrzolek was born on 5 June 1990 in Bochum and grew up in the district of Langendreer.

== International career ==
In 2007, Ostrzolek played in two matches for the U-17 national team of Poland against Lithuania. He did not receive further call-ups from Poland national teams and later chose to represent Germany at the youth level.

On 21 March 2011, Ostrzolek was first invited to the U-21 national team of Germany, when he was nominated by coach Rainer Adrion for the friendlies against the Netherlands and Italy. On 25 March 2011, he was brought on as a substitute in the 22nd minute for Shervin Radjabali-Fardi in a 3–1 win in Sittard-Geleen against the Netherlands. Four days later he came in to replace the 2–2 draw against Italy in Kassel in the 83rd minute for İlkay Gündoğan. Matthias Ostrzolek qualified with the U-21 National Team Germany for the European Under-21 Football Championships 2013. The team won in qualifying to win the group and eliminated in the play-off against Switzerland; a 1–1 draw in the first leg in the BayArena in Leverkusen followed by a 3–1 victory in the second leg in Lucerne. Ostrzolek did not play in the play-off. On 24 March 2013, Ostrzolek played for the last time for the U-21 team of Germany when he at 2–1 victory in the friendly match against Israel in Tel Aviv in the 19th minute came in to replace Tony Jantschke. On 16 May 2013, he was not nominated in the preliminary squad for U-21 Football Championship in 2013.

In December 2013, representatives from the Polish Football Association (PZPN) contacted Ostrzolek about playing for the senior national team of Poland. According to Ostrzolek, it was his first contact with Polish football officials since his brief stint with the U-17 team. Ostrzolek stated that he would be proud to represent either Poland or Germany and would need more time to decide. By his own admission, he can understand nearly everything in Polish but cannot express himself flawlessly in the language.

Ahead of the Euro 2016 qualifying match between Poland and Germany in October 2014, Ostrzolek stated he had not decided on his national team future. The player stated, “I still haven’t decided between Germany and Poland. I don’t know for which national team I will play.”

== Career statistics ==
As of matches played on 5 June 2017.

Appearances and goals by club, season and competition
Club	Season	League			Cup^{1}		Other^{2}		Total	
Club	Season	League	Apps	Goals	Apps	Goals	Apps	Goals	Apps	Goals
VfL Bochum II	2009–10	Regionalliga West	8	0	—		—		8	0
VfL Bochum II	2010–11	Regionalliga West	9	1	—		—		9	1
VfL Bochum II	Total		17	1	—		—		17	1
VfL Bochum	2010–11	2. Bundesliga	17	0	0	0	2	0	19	0
VfL Bochum	2011–12	2. Bundesliga	16	0	1	0	—		17	0
VfL Bochum	Total		33	0	1	0	2	0	36	0
FC Augsburg	2011–12	Bundesliga	12	0	0	0	—		12	0
FC Augsburg	2012–13	Bundesliga	25	0	2	0	—		27	0
FC Augsburg	2013–14	Bundesliga	33	0	2	0	—		35	0
FC Augsburg	Total		70	0	4	0	—		74	0
Hamburger SV	2014–15	Bundesliga	25	0	1	0	2	0	28	0
Hamburger SV	2015–16	Bundesliga	32	0	1	0	—		33	0
Hamburger SV	2016–17	Bundesliga	24	1	4	0	0	0	28	1
Hamburger SV	Total		81	1	6	0	2	0	87	1
Career total			201	2	11	0	4	0	216	2

- 1.Includes German Cup.
- 2.Includes Promotion/relegation playoffs.
