= Cléber Reis =

Brazilian footballer (born 1990)

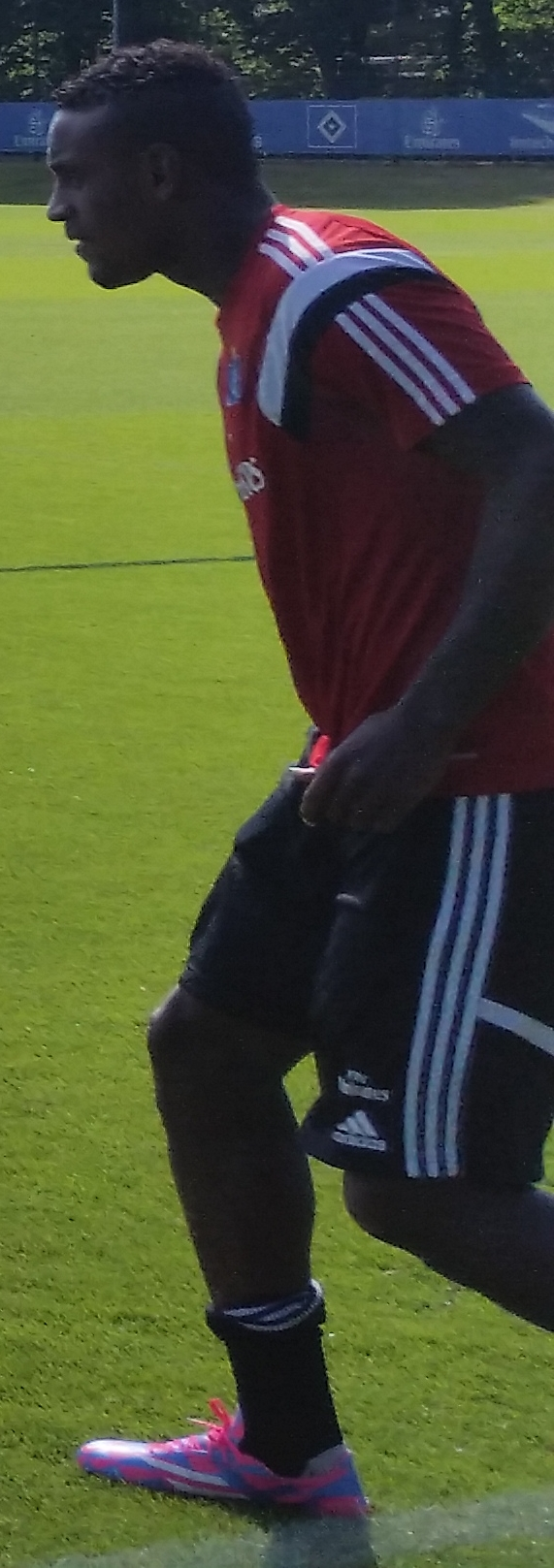
- Cléber training with HSV in 2014

Personal information
- Full name: Cléber Janderson Pereira Reis
- Date of birth: 5 December 1990 (age 35)
- Place of birth: São Francisco do Conde, Brazil
- Height: 1.83 m (6 ft 0 in)
- Position: Centre half

Team information
- Current team: União Suzano Atlético Clube
- Number: 3

Youth career
- 2007–2008: Legião
- 2009–2010: Paulista

Senior career*
Years	Team	Apps	(Gls)
2009–2012	Paulista	10	(0)
2011	→ Itumbiara (loan)	9	(2)
2012	→ Catanduvense (loan)	15	(3)
2012–2013	SEV Hortolândia	0	(0)
2012–2013	→ Ponte Preta (loan)	34	(4)
2013–2014	Corinthians	26	(2)
2014–2016	Hamburger SV	40	(2)
2017–2022	Santos	10	(0)
2017	→ Coritiba (loan)	14	(2)
2018	→ Paraná (loan)	12	(0)
2019	→ Oeste (loan)	21	(3)
2020	→ Ponte Preta (loan)	5	(0)
2023	União Suzano	14	(0)
- * Club domestic league appearances and goals as of 03:26, 9 November 2020 (UTC)

Cléber Janderson Pereira Reis (born 5 December 1990), known as Cléber Reis (Brazilian Portuguese: [ˈklɛbeʁ ˈʁejs]) or simply Cléber, is a Brazilian professional footballer who plays as a central defender.

== Club career ==
=== Early career ===
Born in São Francisco do Conde, Bahia, Cléber started his career with Brasília-based club Legião before joining Paulista in 2009. He made his senior debut for the latter on 5 September 2009, starting in a 2–1 away win against Ponte Preta for the year's Copa Paulista. His first senior goal came on 14 November, in a 1–1 draw at Botafogo-SP.

Rarely used, Cléber subsequently served loans at Itumbiara and Catanduvense before being transferred in 2012.

=== Ponte Preta ===
On 25 April 2012, Cléber joined Série A club Ponte Preta. He made his top tier debut on 2 September, coming on as a late substitute for Marcinho in a 3–1 home win against Atlético Goianiense, also scoring the last goal.

Cléber was an undisputed starter for Ponte during the 2013 Campeonato Paulista, appearing in 21 matches and scoring three goals as his side was knocked out in the semifinals; he was also chosen in the tournament's Team of the year.

=== Corinthians ===
On 22 July 2013, Cléber Reis signed a four-year contract with fellow first division side Corinthians, with the club retaining 20% of the player's federative rights and a third part ownership retaining the remaining 80%. He made his debut for the club on 2 October, starting and scoring the second in a 2–0 home win against Bahia.

A backup to Paulo André and Gil, Cléber became a starter after the former's departure to Shanghai Shenhua in January 2014.

=== Hamburger SV ===
Cléber Reis joined Bundesliga side Hamburger SV in late August 2014, signing a four-year contract until 2018. Hamburg had to pay a transfer fee of believed to be around €3 million.

Cléber Reis scored his first goal for HSV in a 2–1 win over Mainz 05 on 7 December 2014.

=== Santos ===
On 13 December 2016, Cléber Reis joined Santos back in his home country, after an € 2 million offer was accepted by HSV. He arrived in Brazil two days later, and signed a four-year contract with the club shortly after.

Cléber Reis made his debut for the club on 18 February 2017, starting and being sent off in a 1–0 Campeonato Paulista home loss against Ferroviária. He made his Copa Libertadores debut on 9 March, starting in a 1–1 away draw against Sporting Cristal.

On 18 August 2017, after appearing rarely, Cléber Reis was loaned to fellow top tier club Coritiba until the end of the season. A regular starter, he scored two goals for the side but eventually suffered relegation.

On 3 April 2018, Cléber Reis was loaned to Paraná still in the main category, until December. He again suffered team relegation, but was separated from the squad in the latter part of the tournament.

On 24 June 2019, after spending the first six months without playing, Cléber Reis was loaned to Oeste in the Série B, until December. The following 2 January, he returned to his previous club Ponte Preta on loan for the 2020 campaign, but returned to his parent club on 10 December after featuring rarely.

After spending the 2021 season separated from the first team squad, Cléber Reis suffered a knee injury in training. On 8 February 2022, he left the club after reaching an agreement to terminate his contract.

== Career statistics ==
As of 20 October 2023

Appearances and goals by club, season and competition
Club	Season	League			State League		Cup		Continental		Other		Total	
Club	Season	Division	Apps	Goals	Apps	Goals	Apps	Goals	Apps	Goals	Apps	Goals	Apps	Goals
Paulista	2009	Série D	0	0	0	0	—		—		7 (Note: Appearance(s) in Copa Paulista)	1	7	1
Paulista	2010	Paulista	—		6	0	—		—		—		6	0
Paulista	2011	Paulista	—		4	0	1	0	—		—		5	0
Paulista	Total		0	0	10	0	1	0	0	0	7	1	18	1
Itumbiara (loan)	2011	Série D	4	2	5	0	—		—		—		9	2
Catanduvense (loan)	2012	Paulista	—		15	3	—		—		—		15	3
Ponte Preta	2012	Série A	8	1	—		—		—		—		8	1
Ponte Preta	2013	Série A	5	0	21	3	1	0	—		—		27	3
Ponte Preta	Total		13	1	21	3	1	0	0	0	0	0	35	4
Corinthians	2013	Série A	5	1	—		—		—		—		5	1
Corinthians	2014	Série A	15	0	6	1	4	1	—		—		25	2
Corinthians	Total		20	1	6	1	4	1	0	0	0	0	30	3
Hamburger SV	2014–15	Bundesliga	12	1	—		0	0	—		1 (Note: Appearance(s) in Relegation play-offs)	0	13	1
Hamburger SV	2015–16	Bundesliga	23	1	—		1	0	—		—		24	1
Hamburger SV	2016–17	Bundesliga	5	0	—		2	0	—		—		7	0
Hamburger SV	Total		40	2	—		3	0	—		1	0	44	2
Santos	2017	Série A	1	0	5	0	1	0	3 (Note: Appearance(s) in Copa Libertadores)	0	—		10	0
Coritiba (loan)	2017	Série A	14	2	—		—		—		—		14	2
Paraná (loan)	2018	Série A	12	0	—		—		—		—		12	0
Oeste (loan)	2019	Série B	21	3	—		—		—		—		21	3
Ponte Preta (loan)	2020	Série B	0	0	5	0	0	0	—		—		5	0
União Suzano	2023	Paulista A3	—		19	1	—		—		—		19	1
Career total			125	11	86	8	10	1	3	0	8	1	232	21

== Honours ==
=== Individual ===
- Campeonato Paulista Team of the year: 2013
