= Dennis Diekmeier =

German footballer and coach (born 1989)

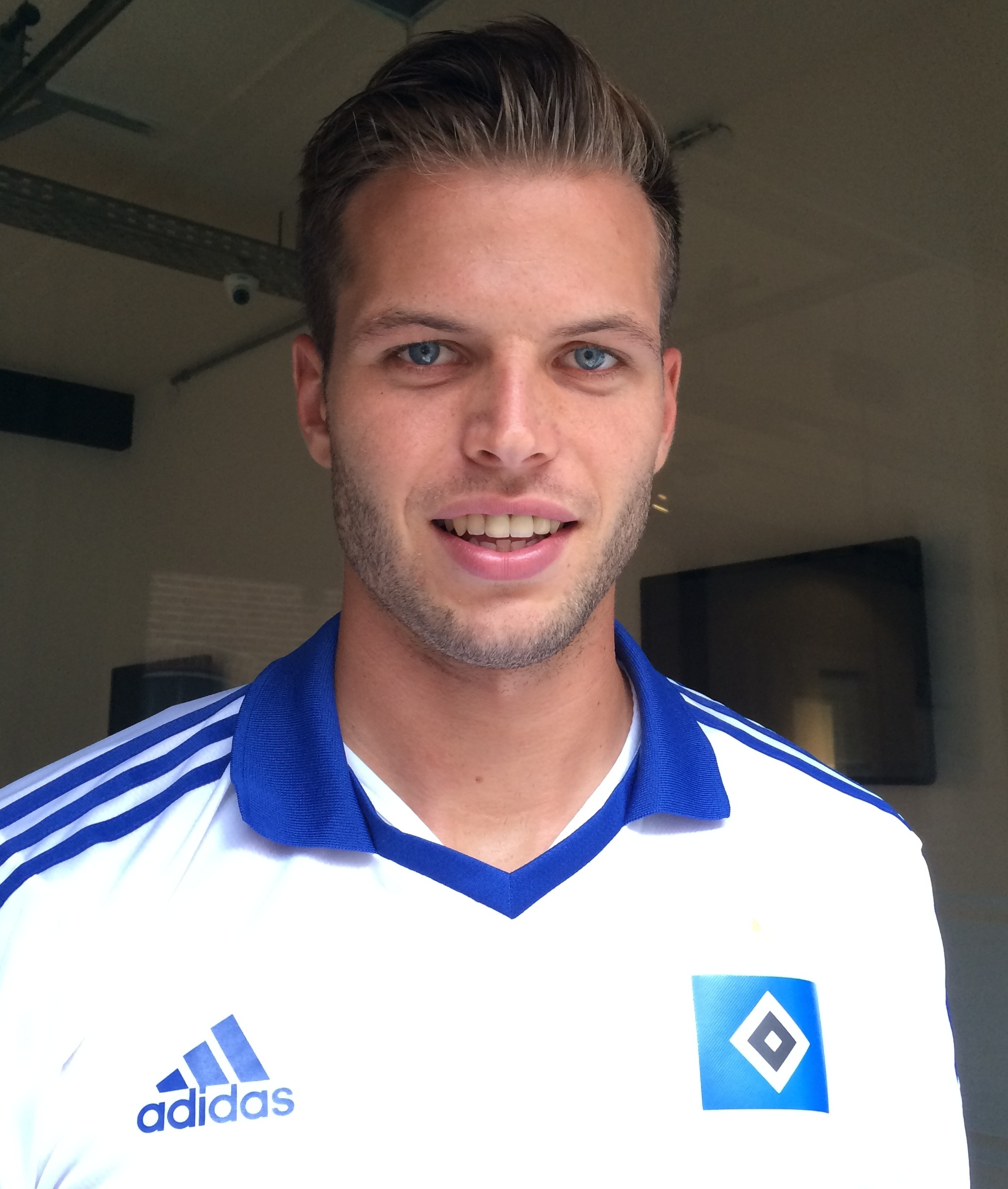
- Diekmeier with Hamburger SV in 2014

Personal information
- Date of birth: 20 October 1989 (age 37)
- Place of birth: Thedinghausen, West Germany
- Height: 1.88 m (6 ft 2 in)
- Position: Right-back

Team information
- Current team: SV Sandhausen (assistant)

Youth career
- 1995–2001: TSV Bierden
- 2001–2003: TSV Verden
- 2003–2008: Werder Bremen

Senior career*
Years	Team	Apps	(Gls)
2008	Werder Bremen II	19	(0)
2009–2010	1. FC Nürnberg	47	(0)
2010–2011	Hamburger SV II	4	(1)
2010–2018	Hamburger SV	173	(0)
2019–2024	SV Sandhausen	145	(3)
Total		388	(4)

International career
2005–2007	Germany U18	4	(1)
2007–2008	Germany U19	19	(4)
2008–2010	Germany U20	3	(0)
2010	Germany U21	1	(0)

Managerial career
- 2025: SV Sandhausen (interim)
- * Club domestic league appearances and goals

Dennis Diekmeier (born 20 October 1989) is a German professional football manager and former player who is assistant coach at Regionalliga Südwest club SV Sandhausen.

A right-back during his playing days, Diekmeier came through the ranks of Werder Bremen before moving to 1. FC Nürnberg in 2009. His form there led him to being named to one of the best full-backs in the league, after which he joined Hamburger SV in July 2010, where he enjoyed a successful eight-year spell. He left after the club suffered relegation in 2018. In January 2019, he signed with SV Sandhausen, helping them avoid relegation in his first season there. He retired from professional football in 2024 and was appointed assistant coach at SV Sandhausen.

Diekmeier has represented Germany, and was a part of the Germany under-19 team that won the 2008 European U-19 Championship.

== Club career ==
=== Early career ===
Diekmeier was born in Thedinghausen, Lower Saxony, and grew up in Achim, where he attended school alongside fellow future Werder Bremen player Felix Wiedwald. Diekmeier started playing football at TSV Bierden and later played at TSV Verden before moving to the youth department of Werder Bremen in 2003. For the 2008–09 season, he was promoted to the second team of Werder Bremen, who competed in the 3. Liga. At the same time, Diekmeier was also included in the first-team squad. He was mostly employed as a midfielder during his time at Werder.

=== 1. FC Nürnberg ===
In January 2009, Diekmeier moved to 2. Bundesliga side 1. FC Nürnberg, where he appeared in all matches during the second half of the season as well as in both relegation play-off games. kicker subsequently placed him as the third best full-back of spring season in their post-season awards. On the first matchday of the 2009–10 Bundesliga, Diekmeier was voted into the "Starting XI of the Day" for kicker-magazine. Eight rounds into the competition, Diekmeier was the only Nürnberg player who had played eight full games, alongside goalkeeper Raphael Schäfer. In the final training session before the ninth match-round, however, he suffered a severe allergic reaction and was treated after an emergency helicopter flew in. Nevertheless, it was decided that Diekmeier was fit to play. However, two hours before the start of the game he was suspended due to one of his medications being on the doping list. The allergic reaction was later diagnosed as allergic rhinitis caused by grass pollen. During the winter break, VfL Wolfsburg offered an estimated € 4 million for Diekmeier, which eventually did not amount to a transfer.

=== Hamburger SV ===
Instead, Diekmeier ended up signing with Hamburger SV in July 2010, whose home games he had attended as a child and whom he had supported since childhood. Because of an injury, he made his first appearance for HSV on 19 March 2011 in a 6–2 home win over 1. FC Köln. Head coach Michael Oenning had placed him in the starting lineup, before he was substituted for Guy Demel in the 55th minute.

Diekmeier played for the club for eight years, during which he was mostly utilized as the main right-back under various coaches. In February 2018, however, negotiations to extend his contract reached a deadlock, and it was decided that he would leave the club at the expiration of his deal. Only at the end of the 2017–18 season, Diekmeier made another appearance under new coach Christian Titz. At that point, HSV were threatened by relegation, and he would not make another appearance in the final eight matches of the season. After HSV eventually suffered the first relegation for the Bundesliga in club history, Diekmeier left the club as his contract expired. He did not immediately earn himself a contract at another club, instead keeping himself in shape with the aid of personal coach.

=== SV Sandhausen ===
In early January 2019, after being a free agent for six months, Diekmeier joined relegation threatened 2. Bundesliga club SV Sandhausen, where he signed a one-and-a-half-year contract. He made 16 league appearances during the second half of the 2018–19 season in which the club avoided relegation. Prior to the 2019–20 season, Diekmeier signed a contract extension keeping him in Sandhausen until 2022, and was also appointed vice-captain by head coach Uwe Koschinat. After regular club captain Stefan Kulovits suffered an injury which kept him sidelined for the entire first half of the season, Diekmeier played 17 matches as captain for Sandhausen.

On 26 May 2020, Diekmeier finally scored his first ever professional goal at the age of 30 in Sandhausen's 1–0 away win over SV Wehen Wiesbaden, a feat which the club celebrated by offering free printing of his name and number on their replica kits. This goal proved momentous in marking the first of four consecutive victories for Sandhausen towards the end of the 2019–20 season, the points from which they secured to stay in the 2. Bundesliga for another season with two games to spare, despite a 5–1 away defeat to VfB Stuttgart on the 32nd matchday. On matchday 34, Diekmeier scored a goal capping off a 1–5 drubbing of Hamburger SV, his former club. On 11 July 2020, Diekmeier capped off a strong 2019–20 campaign by being named in the kicker "Team of the Season" for the 2. Bundesliga.

Diekmeier was part of the Sandhausen team that suffered relegation to the 3. Liga in the 2022–23 season. On 29 April 2024, Diekmeier announced his retirement from professional football after the 2023–24 season.

== International career ==
He was part of the Germany team that won the 2008 European U-19 Championship.

== Coaching career ==
After retiring from playing, Diekmeier began his coaching career at SV Sandhausen, where he was appointed assistant coach to Sreto Ristić ahead of the 2024–25 season. From January 2025, he continued in the role under Ristić's successor, Kenan Koçak.

In early April 2025, Koçak resigned as head coach, after which Diekmeier was appointed interim manager for the remainder of the season, working alongside Gerhard Kleppinger, who held the required UEFA Pro Licence. At the time of his appointment, Sandhausen were involved in a relegation battle and ultimately finished the season in the relegation zone, confirming their relegation to the Regionalliga Südwest. Despite the league outcome, the club won the Baden Cup in the final competitive match of the season, securing qualification for the following season's DFB-Pokal.

Ahead of the 2025–26 season, Sandhausen appointed Olaf Janßen as head coach, with Diekmeier initially remaining on the coaching staff. He was later granted a leave of absence from his duties for family reasons.

== Personal life ==
Diekmeier is married to Dana Diekmeier, whom he met in Bremen. The couple married in May 2010 and have four children. In early 2025, their eldest daughter was diagnosed with a serious illness, leading Diekmeier to take a temporary leave from his professional responsibilities. Members of the family have since spoken publicly about the experience and have supported cancer-related awareness and charity initiatives, including appearances connected to professional football events.

The Diekmeier family also operates a YouTube channel, Team Diekmeier.

== Records ==
- Diekmeier held the record of being the Bundesliga player with the most appearances without ever scoring until finally scoring on 26 May 2020 in his 11th season in German professional football.

== Career statistics ==
Appearances and goals by club, season and competition
Club	Season	League			DFB-Pokal		Other^{1}		Total		Ref.
Club	Season	League	Apps	Goals	Apps	Goals	Apps	Goals	Apps	Goals	Ref.
Werder Bremen II	2007–08	Regionalliga Nord	4	0	—		—		4	0	
Werder Bremen II	2008–09	3. Liga	15	0	—		—		15	0	
Werder Bremen II	Totals		19	0	—		—		19	0	—
Nürnberg	2008–09	2. Bundesliga	17	0	0	0	2	0	19	0	
Nürnberg	2009–10	Bundesliga	30	0	2	0	—		32	0	
Nürnberg	Totals		47	0	2	0	2	0	51	0	—
Hamburger SV II	2010–11	Regionalliga Nord	4	1	—		—		4	1	
Hamburger SV	2010–11	Bundesliga	8	0	0	0	—		8	0	
Hamburger SV	2011–12	Bundesliga	24	0	3	0	—		27	0	
Hamburger SV	2012–13	Bundesliga	32	0	0	0	—		32	0	
Hamburger SV	2013–14	Bundesliga	20	0	1	0	2	0	23	0	
Hamburger SV	2014–15	Bundesliga	21	0	1	0	2	0	24	0	
Hamburger SV	2015–16	Bundesliga	22	0	0	0	—		22	0	
Hamburger SV	2016–17	Bundesliga	24	0	2	0	—		26	0	
Hamburger SV	2017–18	Bundesliga	22	0	0	0	—		22	0	
Hamburger SV	Totals		173	0	7	0	4	0	184	0	—
SV Sandhausen	2018–19	2. Bundesliga	16	0	0	0	—		16	0	
SV Sandhausen	2019–20	2. Bundesliga	33	2	1	0	—		34	2	
SV Sandhausen	2020–21	2. Bundesliga	31	0	1	0	—		32	0	
SV Sandhausen	2021–22	2. Bundesliga	25	1	0	0	—		25	1	
SV Sandhausen	2022–23	2. Bundesliga	13	0	1	0	—		14	0	
SV Sandhausen	2023–24	3. Liga	27	0	1	0	—		28	0	
SV Sandhausen	Totals		145	3	4	0	—		149	3	—
Career totals			388	4	13	0	6	0	407	4	—

- 1.Includes promotion/relegation playoff.
