= Marco Holz =

German footballer (born 1990)

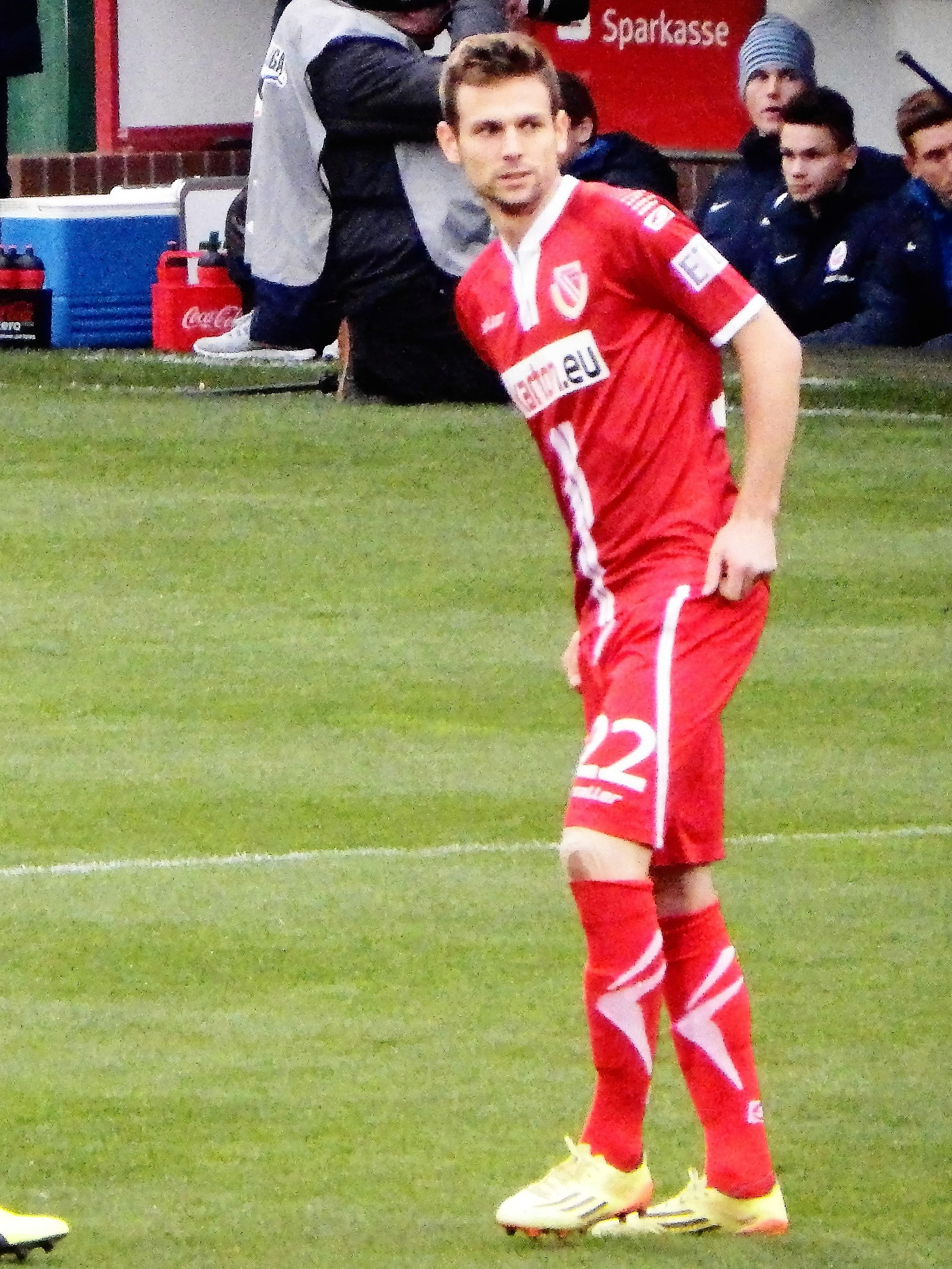
- Holz in 2015

Personal information
- Date of birth: 31 January 1990 (age 36)
- Place of birth: Deggendorf, Germany
- Height: 1.80 m (5 ft 11 in)
- Position: Right-back

Youth career
- –2006: 1860 Munich
- 2006–2009: Wacker Burghausen

Senior career*
Years	Team	Apps	(Gls)
2009–2014	Wacker Burghausen	146	(13)
2014–2016	Energie Cottbus	54	(2)
2016–2019	1. FC Saarbrücken	91	(15)
2019–2021	Türkgücü München	28	(7)
2021–2022	Wacker Innsbruck	43	(6)
2022–2023	Türkgücü München	33	(4)
- * Club domestic league appearances and goals as of 06:16, 4 July 2024 (UTC)

Marco Holz (born 31 January 1990) is a German professional footballer who most recently played as a right-back for Regionalliga Bayern club Türkgücü München.
