= Ashton Götz =

German footballer

Personal information
- Full name: Ashton-Phillip Shawn Götz
- Date of birth: 16 July 1993 (age 33)
- Place of birth: Pirmasens, Germany
- Height: 1.77 m (5 ft 10 in)
- Position: Right-back

Team information
- Current team: TuS Dassendorf
- Number: 16

Youth career
- SV St. Georg
- SC Concordia
- SC Hamm
- 2008–2012: Hamburger SV

Senior career*
Years	Team	Apps	(Gls)
2011–2017	Hamburger SV II	82	(0)
2014–2017	Hamburger SV	11	(0)
2017–2018	Roda JC	9	(0)
2019–2023	SV Drochtersen/Assel	37	(6)
2023–	TuS Dassendorf	19	(2)
- * Club domestic league appearances and goals as of 04:53, 4 July 2024 (UTC)

Ashton-Phillip Shawn Götz (born 16 July 1993) is a German footballer who plays as a right-back for TuS Dassendorf.

== Club career ==
Götz is a youth product from Hamburger SV. In 2011, he made his debut for the reserve team. He made his Bundesliga debut in the club's first team on 24 September 2014 against Borussia Mönchengladbach. He replaced Dennis Diekmeier in overtime in a 1–0 away defeat.

In May 2017, he was suspended by the coach of Hamburg's first team, Markus Gisdol, and subsequently, his contract with the first team was dissolved.

== International career ==
Götz was born in Germany to an African American father and a German mother, and was scouted to perhaps join the United States men's national soccer team.
