= Carl-Edgar Jarchow =

German politician

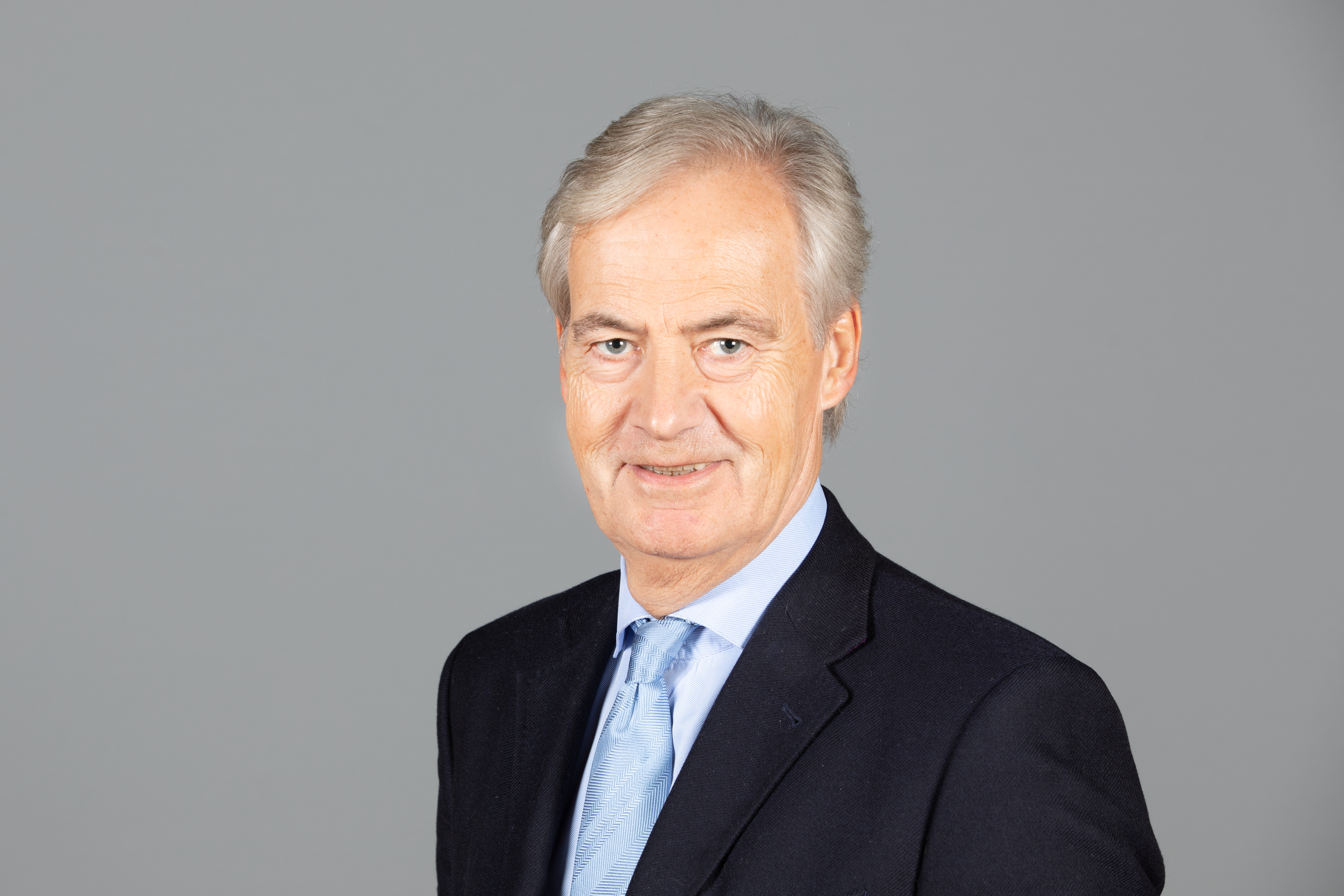
Carl-Edgar Jarchow (2018)

Carl-Edgar Jarchow (born 29 March 1955 in Hamburg) is a German politician (FDP) and chairman of the football club Hamburger SV.

In the 1990s, Jarchow was a member of the Statt Partei and vice-chairman of the party in the state of Hamburg. In 2007, he became a member of the liberal FDP. In the 2011 Hamburg state election, he was elected to the Hamburg Parliament. Since April 2011, he has been a member of the Hamburg state executive board of the party. Since March 2011, Jarchow has been the chairman of the football club Hamburger SV.
