= Johan Djourou =

Swiss footballer (born 1987)

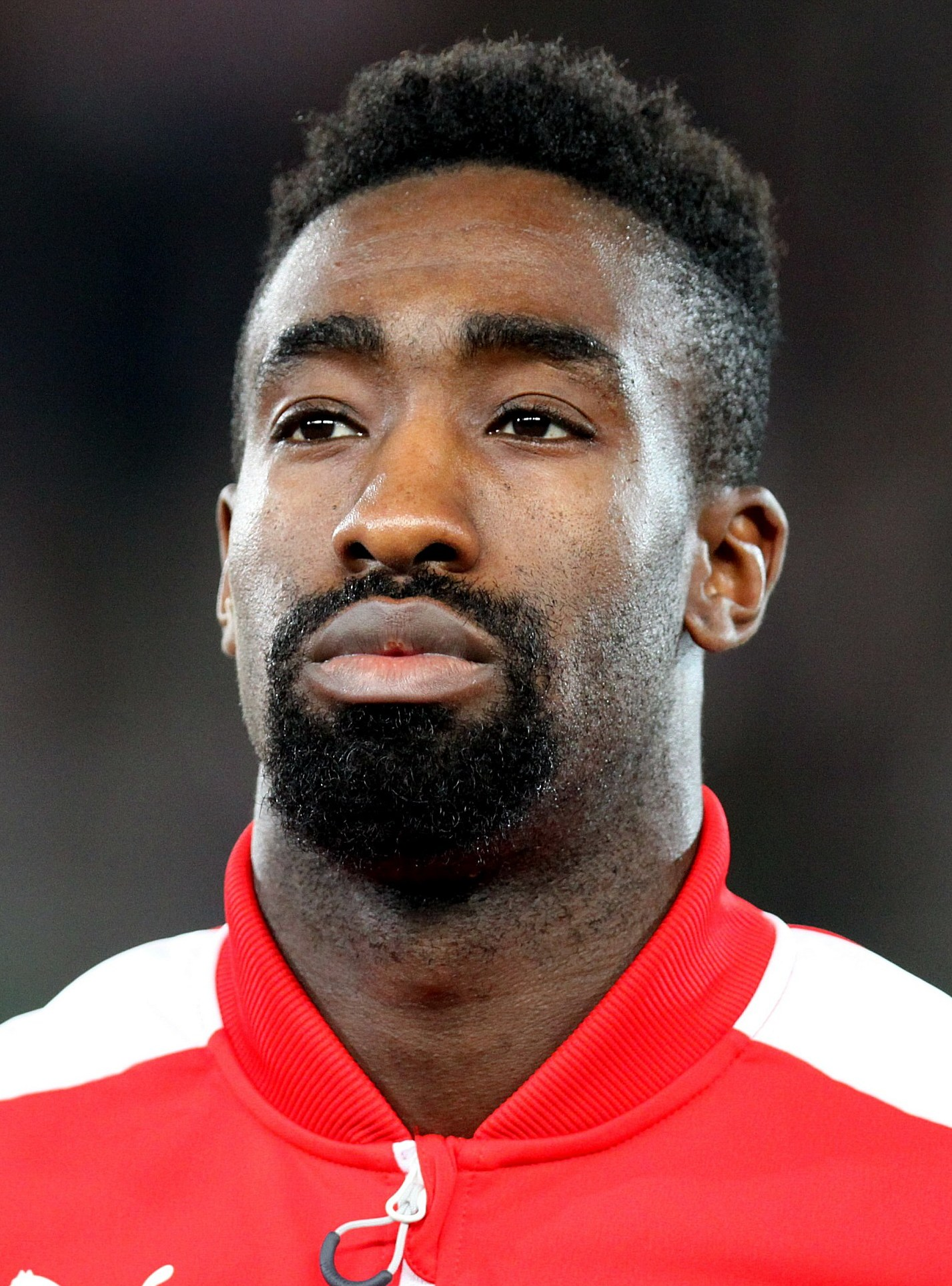
- Djourou with Switzerland in 2015

Personal information
- Full name: Danon Issouf Johannes Djourou Gbadjere
- Date of birth: 18 January 1987 (age 39)
- Place of birth: Abidjan, Ivory Coast
- Height: 1.91 m (6 ft 3 in)
- Position: Centre back

Youth career
- 1998–2003: Étoile Carouge
- 2003–2004: Arsenal

Senior career*
Years	Team	Apps	(Gls)
2004–2014	Arsenal	86	(1)
2007–2008	→ Birmingham City (loan)	13	(0)
2013	→ Hannover 96 (loan)	14	(0)
2013–2014	→ Hamburger SV (loan)	24	(0)
2014–2017	Hamburger SV	74	(2)
2017–2018	Antalyaspor	18	(1)
2018–2019	SPAL	5	(0)
2020	Sion	2	(0)
2020	Neuchâtel Xamax	5	(0)
2020–2021	Nordsjælland	11	(0)
Total		252	(4)

International career
2001–2002	Switzerland U16	4	(0)
2002	Switzerland U17	4	(0)
2003–2004	Switzerland U19	8	(1)
2004–2005	Switzerland U20	9	(1)
2006	Switzerland U21	2	(0)
2006–2018	Switzerland	76	(2)
- * Club domestic league appearances and goals

Danon Issouf Johannes Djourou Gbadjere (pronounced [dʒuʁu]; born 18 January 1987), known as Johan Djourou, is a Swiss former professional footballer who played as a centre back. According to his profile on the website of his former club Arsenal, Djourou possessed "pace, power and whole-hearted commitment" in addition to his versatility.

He played as a defensive midfielder in his youth for former club Étoile Carouge, but when he arrived at Arsenal, he was converted to a central defender. He occasionally filled in at full back for Arsenal and played several games in central midfield while on loan to Birmingham City. He spent time on loan at Hannover 96 in 2013 before joining fellow Bundesliga team Hamburger SV, initially on loan, later that year. After three years with Hamburg he went on to play for Turkish Super Lig club Antalyaspor, SPAL of Serie A, the Swiss Super League's Sion and Neuchâtel Xamax, and finally Nordsjælland in the Danish Superliga.

Djourou represented Switzerland from 2006 to 2018, earning 76 caps. He was called up by the nation at three FIFA World Cups and two UEFA European Championships.

== Club career ==
=== Early career ===
Djourou was born in Abidjan, Ivory Coast, to Ivorian parents Joachim and Angeline, and was later adopted by his father's first wife, Danièle, a Swiss woman. Djourou later acknowledged that he has two mothers in his life.

They moved to Geneva when he was 17 months old. According to his father, Djourou began playing football when he was a baby, saying: "I would grab balls in stores and play football in the store." Djourou enrolled at the Payerne Training Center when he was 13 and then, in 2002, Djourou joined local second division side Étoile Carouge as a midfielder at 15. He joined Arsenal on 1 August 2003.

=== Arsenal ===
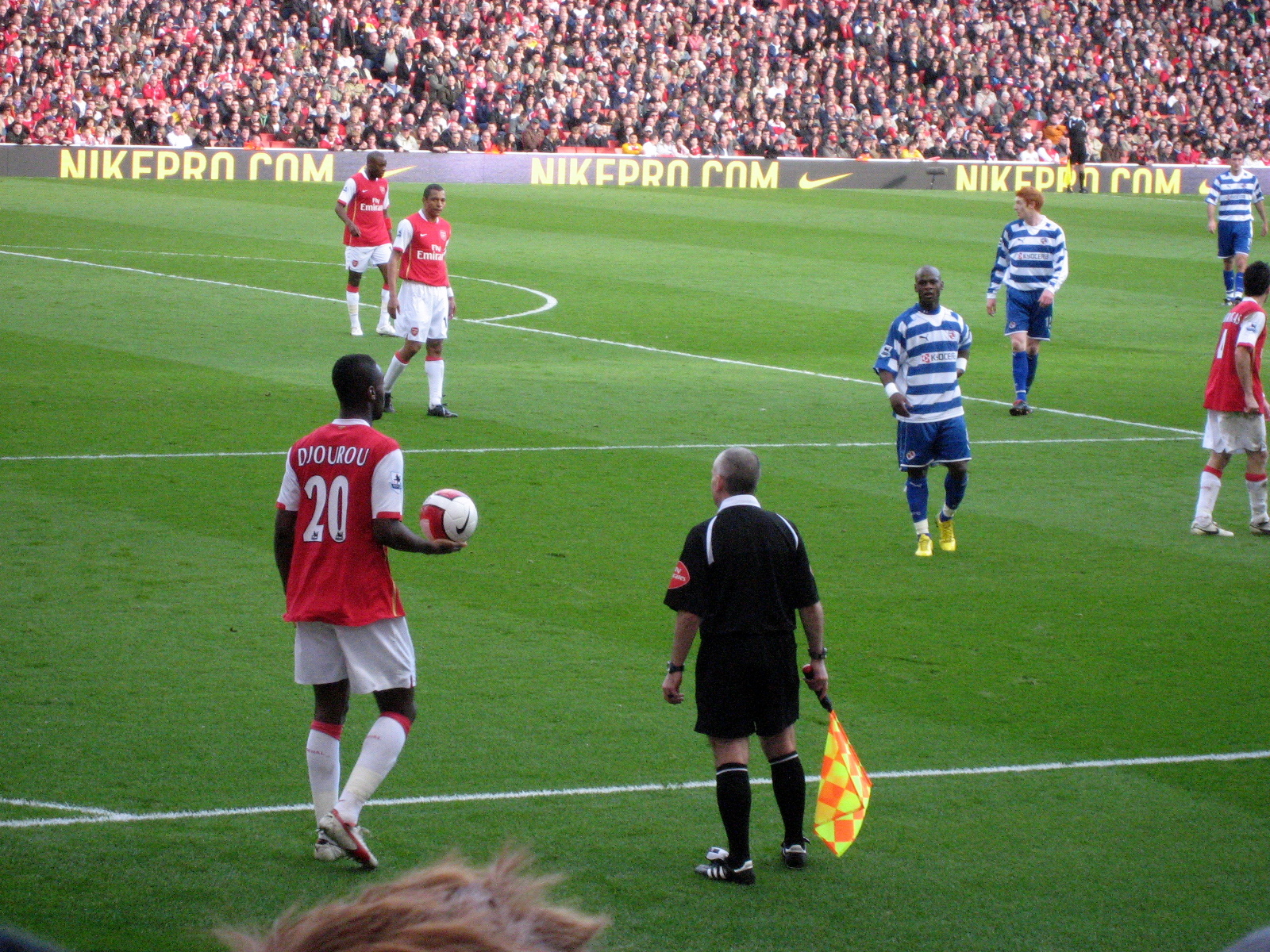
Djourou taking a throw-in against Reading

Djourou made his first senior start for Arsenal in a 3–1 victory against Everton in the League Cup, having made his first appearance after 89 minutes of the corresponding match in the previous round against Manchester City on 27 October 2004. He later made three appearances at the end of the 2004–05 season. On 21 January 2005, Djourou signed a two-year contract extension with the club.

His first appearance of the 2005–06 season came on 29 November 2005 against Reading in the Round of 16 of the League Cup, starting the whole game, in a 3–0 win. He then played in the third round clash with Cardiff City. Djourou made his full Premiership debut for Arsenal in the 7–0 victory over Middlesbrough on 14 January 2006, playing at centre-back with Philippe Senderos. He started Arsenal's FA Cup fourth round clash with Bolton Wanderers as part of a makeshift defence, a game in which Arsenal lost 1–0. In February 2006, Djourou played in the league games against West Ham United, Birmingham City and Bolton Wanderers. After a five match absence, he returned to the first team, coming on as a substitute against Aston Villa in Arsenal's 5–0 victory, replacing the injured Emmanuel Eboué. Djourou then started in a league match against Portsmouth on 12 April 2006, a game which also saw the comeback of Sol Campbell, in a 1–1 draw. At the end of the 2005–06 season, he went on to make twelve appearances in all competitions.

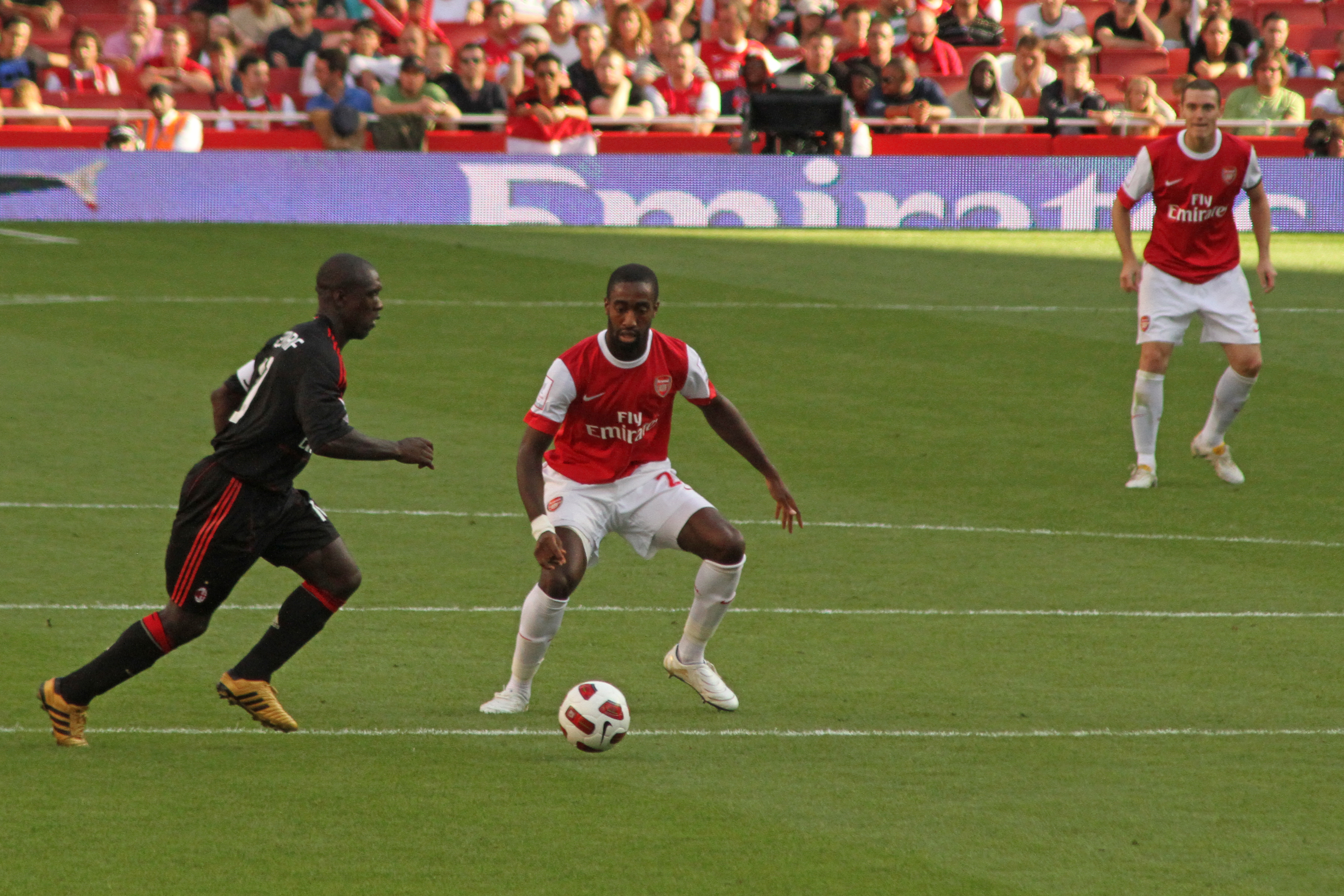
Djourou about to tackle A.C. Milan's Clarence Seedorf

Following the conclusion of the World Cup, Manager Arsène Wenger said that he would be planning on using Djourou in the first team ahead of the new season. He started the whole game in the opening game of the season in Arsenal's first ever match at Emirates Stadium in a 1–1 draw with Aston Villa. Djourou then played in both legs against Dinamo Zagreb in the UEFA Champions League third qualifying round, as Arsenal won 5–1 on aggregate. He then helped Arsenal keep two separate clean sheets; which the first one occurred between 17 September 2006 and 23 September 2006 and the second one occurred between 14 October 2006 and 22 October 2006. On 1 November 2006, it was announced that Djourou signed a six-year contract extension with the club. Shortly after, however, he missed four matches, due to international commitment and competitions, he returned to the first team against Fulham on 29 November 2006, coming on as a 65th-minute substitute, in a 2–1 loss. This was followed by keeping two consecutive clean sheets against Tottenham Hotspur and FC Porto. The next two months saw Djourou make only two appearances due to being sidelined with injuries. It wasn't until on 11 February 2007 when he returned to the first team against Wigan Athletic, starting a match and played 51 minutes before being substituted, in a 2–1 win. However, his return was short-lived when Djourou suffered a knee injury that kept him out throughout February. It wasn't until on 3 March 2007 when he returned to the starting line-up, in a 2–1 win against Reading. After not playing for two months, Djourou returned to the starting line-up in the last game of the season against Portsmouth, playing in the defensive midfield position, as Arsenal drew 0–0. At the end of the 2006–07 season, he went on to make thirty appearances in all competitions.

==== Loan to Birmingham City ====
On 10 August 2007, Djourou signed for Birmingham City on loan for five months.

He made his debut two days later against the previous season's FA Cup and League Cup winners Chelsea. This was a closely fought contest in which Chelsea ran out eventual 3–2 winners, in which Djourou cleared off the line from Frank Lampard to keep Birmingham City in the game. He then helped the club keep two consecutive clean sheets between 15 September 2007 and 22 September 2007 against gifted Bolton Wanderers and Liverpool. Djourou continued to play for Birmingham consistently through his loan period until 22 December 2007, when he gifted Bolton Wanderers' Nicolas Anelka a goal via an errant throw-in. This marked his last appearance for the club. Although Birmingham manager Alex McLeish was keen to retain him, Djourou returned to Arsenal at the end of his loan spell, as cover for Kolo Touré and Alex Song who were playing in the 2008 African Cup of Nations. By the time he returned to his parent club, Djourou made 13 appearances in all competitions.

==== Return to Arsenal ====
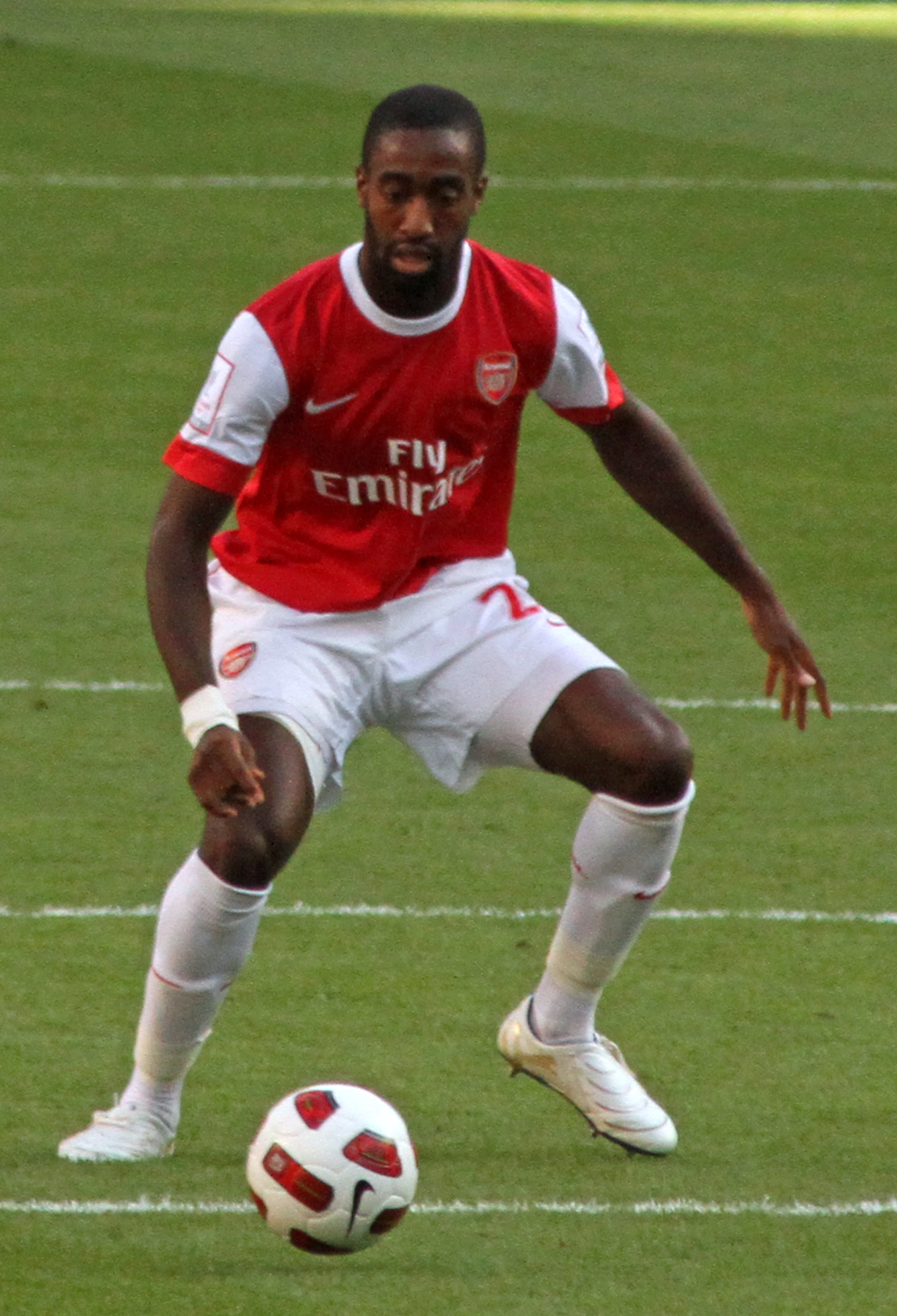
Djourou at the 2010 Emirates Cup

Shortly after returning from a loan spell at Birmingham City, Djourou made his first Arsenal's appearance of the 2007–08 season, coming against Tottenham Hotspur in the semi-finals of the League Cup, and played 45 minutes before being substituted at half time, as they drew 1–1. However, he suffered a groin injury that saw him sidelined for three months. Although Djourou returned to the substitute bench in mid–April, it wasn't until on 28 April 2008 when he returned to the first team, coming on as a 78th-minute substitute, in a 6–2 win against Derby County. At the end of the 2007–08 season, Djourou made three appearances in all competitions for Arsenal.

In May 2008, Djourou stated that he would be willing to partner Cesc Fàbregas in midfield after the departure of Mathieu Flamini to A.C. Milan. Instead, he played in the centre of defence as first choice backup following the departure of fellow Swiss defender Philippe Senderos to A.C. Milan on a season-long loan. Djourou made his first appearance of the 2008–09 season, starting the whole game, and kept a clean sheet, in a 1–0 win against West Bromwich Albion in the opening game of the season. He played in both legs against FC Twente in UEFA Champions League third qualifying round, as Arsenal won 6–0 on aggregate. On 22 September 2008, Djourou signed a new long-term contract. Following the absence of William Gallas, he started in the next seven matches for the club. During his first team run-ins, Djourou scored an own goal against Chelsea on 30 November 2008, but Arsenal managed to catch up and went on to win 2–1. This lasted until he tweaked his calf in the warm-up and dropped out at the last minute prior to a 2–2 draw against Aston Villa on 22 December 2008. After missing two matches as a result, Djourou returned to the starting line-up against Plymouth Argyle in the third round of the FA Cup and helped Arsenal win 3–1. Since returning from injury, he found himself in and out of the first team for the club. However, on 11 April 2009, in a league match against Wigan Athletic, Djourou suffered a knee injury which later required surgery. He recovered from the knee and returned to the first team, coming on as a second-half substitute, in a 2–0 win against Middlesbrough on 26 April 2009. Djourou made two more appearances later in the 2008–09 season. He went on to make 29 appearances in all competitions.

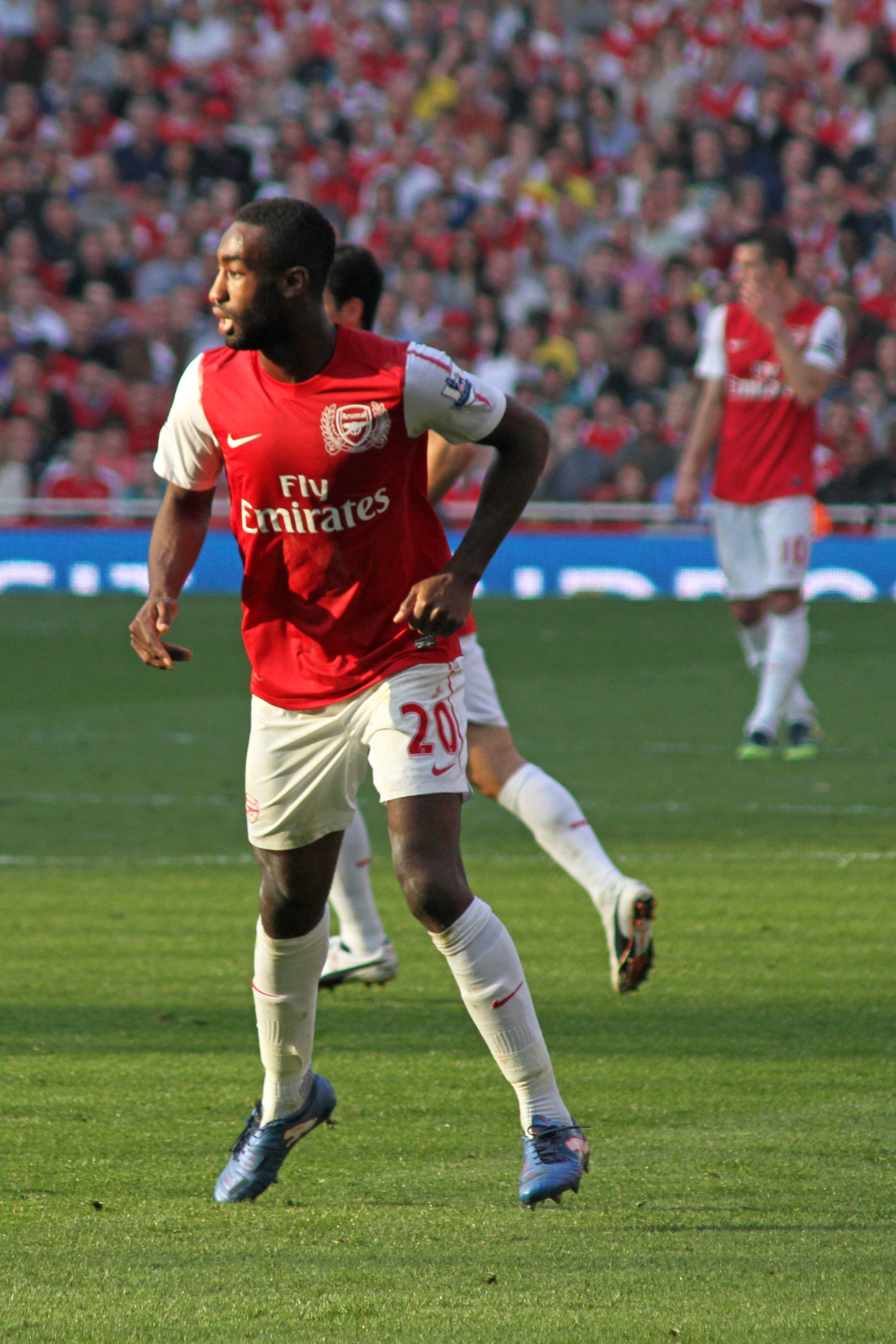
Djourou about to chase the ball while playing for Arsenal in 2012

After Touré's departure to Manchester City, Djourou had a chance to break into the starting eleven. However, he suffered a knee injury while on international duty. It was announced on 6 September 2009 that Djourou's recovery period would take an estimated six to eight months; Arsène Wenger stated: "He will have to be patient this season." After returning to training in April, Djourou made his return from injury, coming on as a second-half substitute for the injured Mikaël Silvestre, in the 4–0 win over Fulham in Arsenal's final game of the season, in what turned out to be his only appearance in the 2009–10 campaign.

Ahead of the 2010–11 season, Djourou said he's expecting competitions following the new signing of Laurent Koscielny. Djourou appeared two times in the first two months of the season, and was placed on the substitute bench as a result. Due to Thomas Vermaelen's injury at the beginning of the 2010–11 campaign, Djourou received more opportunities to play. Djourou then played a role when he set up two goals, in a 5–1 win against Shakhtar Donetsk on 19 October 2010. Wenger admitted that he rotated the Swiss international because he missed an entire year and did not want to lose him. Djourou became Arsenal's first-choice centre-back, playing in all eight games in January 2011, during which time Arsenal conceded no Premier League goals. His performance was praised by the club's captain Cesc Fàbregas. He played in both legs of the semi-finals against Ipswich Town to help Arsenal win 3–1 on aggregate to reach the Football League Cup Final. Djourou scored his first goal for Arsenal on 5 February, in the third minute of a 4–4 draw against Newcastle United at St. James' Park. He, once again, helped the club's defence keep three consecutive clean sheets between 12 February 2011 and 5 March 2011 against Wolverhampton Wanderers, Stoke City and Sunderland. On 27 February 2011, he started and played the full 90 minutes alongside Laurent Koscielny against Birmingham City in the 2011 Football League Cup Final held at Wembley Stadium in a 2–1 defeat. On 12 March 2011, while playing in the quarter finals of the FA Cup away to Manchester United at Old Trafford, Djourou suffered a suspected dislocated shoulder in a collision with teammate Bacary Sagna. Djourou was carried from the field and Wenger later confirmed that he would be unavailable for the remainder of the 2010–11 season. This came as a major blow to Arsenal's title challenge, up until then having not lost a Premier League game with him on the field. As well as that Djourou had played a major part in defence in cover of the injured Vermaelen. Djourou recovered more quickly than expected, returning to play the whole of the 1–1 draw with Liverpool at the Emirates Stadium on 17 April 2011, playing alongside Koscielny, and the North London Derby three days later. On 24 April 2011, against Bolton Wanderers at the Reebok Stadium, he conceded a penalty (missed by Kevin Davies) in a 2–1 defeat which effectively ended Arsenal's title hopes. At the end of the 2010–11 season, he played in a total of 37 matches for the Gunners in all competitions. Local newspaper Islington Gazette gave Djourou's performance 8/10, saying: "Having missed over a year with a serious knee injury, his return coincided with a defensive shortage and he stepped into the breach admirably, not being on the losing side in the league until late April, when his form did start to fade. Has done enough to be first choice."

Ahead of the 2011–12 season, Djourou said he would fight for his place in the first team, having recovered from a shoulder injury. Having described Arsenal's failure to not reach the UEFA Champions League group stage as 'unthinkable', Djourou played in both legs against Udinese and helped the club win 3–1 on aggregate to reach further in the Group Stage. However, on 28 August 2011, he played in the centre of a young Arsenal seriously weakened by injuries for a match against Manchester United at Old Trafford. Arsenal lost 8–2, in what was their heaviest defeat since 1896, a 115-year record. Three days later Arsenal announced the signing of experienced German defender Per Mertesacker from Werder Bremen, and Djourou's first team opportunities became more limited in the centre-back position. As a result, he began to receive first team football by playing in the right-back position for the club. Despite being involved in the first team, Djourou, at times, found himself out of the starting eleven, due to competitions that saw him placed on the substitute bench and his own injury concern. In a 2–1 loss against Fulham on 2 January 2012, he was sent off for a second bookable offence. After serving a one match suspension, Djourou returned to the starting line-up against Swansea City on 15 January 2012, and set up Arsenal's second goal of the game, in a 3–2 loss. The following month saw him signed a three-year contract extension until summer 2015. The second half of the season continued to see his first team opportunities limited. During the 2011–12 season, he started 19 times for Arsenal and made 8 substitute appearances.

Ahead of the 2012–13 season, Djourou was told by Manager Ottmar Hitzfeld that he must leave Arsenal in hopes of getting a call up from Switzerland. This led Djourou to comment over his future at the club. However, he announced his intention to stay at Arsenal. Unfortunately, Djourou's first team opportunities at the club continued to be limited and only appeared two times in the first half of the season. As a result, Djourou was told by Wenger that he can leave Arsenal. Despite leaving the club, Djourou reflected on his time at Arsenal, saying: "I loved him, first of all to have the chance to spend that time with him, for him to build me. He built many players but first of all he gave me the chance to express myself. I think what I liked about the boss was the way he handled every case, you would say it was similar but also so different."

==== Loan to Hannover ====
On 3 January 2013, Djourou confirmed that he was set to move to Bundesliga club Hannover on loan until the end of the season, with no option to buy included in the deal. He said, "I joined the club who wanted me the most. At my age, the priority is to play regularly. To do this, I did not hesitate to refuse offers with the most exclusive clubs who made important financial efforts."

Djourou made his Hannover 96 debut, starting the whole game, in a 5–4 loss against Schalke 04 on 18 January 2013. Since joining the club, he quickly became a first team regular for the side, playing in the centre-back position. Djourou then helped Hannover 96 keep two consecutive clean sheets between 30 March 2013 and 7 April 2013 against FC Augsburg and VfB Stuttgart. This lasted until he tore his hamstring that saw him miss three matches. It wasn't until the last game of the season against Fortuna Düsseldorf when Djourou returned to the starting line-up and kept a clean sheet, in a 3–0 win. At the end of the 2012–13 season, he went on to make sixteen appearances in all competitions. Following this, his time at Hannover 96 came to an end and he returned to his parent club.

=== Hamburger SV ===
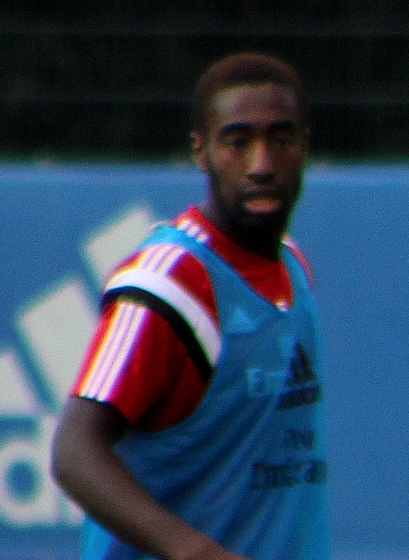
Djourou training prior to a Hamburger SV's match in 2014

On 1 July 2013, Djourou undertook a medical before signing for Bundesliga side Hamburger SV on loan for a season. It was reported that this time, the deal did include an option to buy. He said: "I'm very happy now that everything is sorted. HSV are a big club, with a lot of quality and great fans. I am convinced that this is the right step for my career."

However, his start to his Hamburger SV's career suffered a setback when Djourou suffered a groin injury that saw him miss the first three league matches of the season. It wasn't until on 31 August 2013 when he made his debut for the club, starting the match and played 72 minutes before being substituted, in a 4–0 win against Eintracht Braunschweig. Since making his debut for Hamburger SV, Djourou started in the next six matches for the club. In a match against Stuttgart on 20 October 2013, he scored an own goal, as Hamburger SV drew 3–3. However, in a follow-up match against SC Freiburg, Djourou suffered a groin injury once again and was substituted in the 22nd minute, resulting a 3–0 win for the club. It was announced that he would be out for several weeks. It wasn't until on 24 November 2013 when he returned to the starting line-up against Hannover 96, and helped Hamburger SV win 3–1. Having started in the next five matches, Djourou tore his muscle fibre that kept him out for a month. It wasn't until on 8 February 2014 when he returned to the starting line-up, in a 3–0 win against Hertha BSC. Since returning from injury, Djourou regained his first team place for the next two months. This lasted until he, once again, injured his adductors while warming up prior to a 3–1 loss against Wolfsburg on 19 April 2014. Despite this, Djourou returned to the first team and played in both legs of the relegation play-off matches against Greuther Fürth, where a 1–1 draw kept Hamburg retaining their Bundesliga status via an away goal. At the end of the 2013–14 season, he went on to make 26 appearances in all competitions.

As the 2013–14 season was coming to an end, Hamburg confirmed on 2 April 2014 that they had activated the buying clause and signed Djourou on a permanent deal. His first game after signing for the club on a permanent basis came in the first round of the DFB–Pokal against Energie Cottbus and played 120 minutes with a 2–2 draw as a final score, resulting in a penalty shootout; and successfully converted the penalty in the shootout to help Hamburg win 4–2 to progress to the next round. Since the start of the 2014–15 season, he continued to establish himself in the starting eleven, playing in the centre-back position. Following the absence of captain Rafael van der Vaart, Djourou captained the club for the first time against Hannover 96 on 14 September 2014, as Hamburger SV lost 2–0. He then captained Hamburger SV in the next four matches for the side. At times, Djourou did captained the side as the 2014–15 season progressed. However, in a match against Borussia Dortmund on 7 March 2015, Djourou suffered an injury in the 18th minute against and was substituted, as the club drew 0–0. Up until now, he started in every match despite facing injury threat along the way. It wasn't until on 20 March 2015 when Djourou returned to the starting line-up against Hertha BSC, as Hamburger SV lost 1–0. However, his return was short-lived when he was sent off for a second bookable offence, in a 2–0 against Wolfsburg on 11 April 2015. After serving a one match suspension, Djourou returned to the starting line-up against FC Augsburg on 25 April 2015 and helped the club win 3–2. He then played in both legs of the relegation play-off matches against Karlsruher SC, as Hamburg won 3–2 on aggregate to retain their Bundesliga status. Reflecting on the 2014–15 season, Djourou said: "It must never be like this again. You can't do that again. This pressure is too much. And by that I mean everyone. The whole city, HSV and all of our fans." He went on to make 36 appearances in all competitions.

At the start of the 2015–16 season, Djourou was appointed a new captain of Hamburger SV following the departure of Van der Vaart. He then scored his first goal for the club, in his 70th appearance, as well as, setting up one of the goals, in a 3–2 win against Stuttgart on 22 August 2015. Shortly after, however, Djourou tore his muscle fibre that kept him out for weeks. It wasn't until on 11 September 2015 when he returned to the starting line-up against Borussia Mönchengladbach and kept a clean sheet, as the club won 3–0. Djourou helped Hamburger SV keep two more clean sheets in the next two matches against Eintracht Frankfurt and FC Ingolstadt 04. Since returning from injury, he regained his first team place, as well as, captaincy for the club. Djourou then scored his second goal for Hamburger SV, in a 3–1 loss against 1. FSV Mainz 05 on 5 December 2015. After missing one match due to influenza, he returned to the starting line-up on 19 December 2015 against FC Augsburg, as the club lost 1–0. In the second half of the season, Djourou appeared eleven times for the club as captain. This was due to his injury concerns, suspension and competitions that saw him placed on the substitute bench. In a 3–2 loss against Schalke 04 on 2 March 2016, he was sent off for a second bookable offence. After the match, Djourou's sending off was criticised by Manager Bruno Labbadia, saying he let the team down. Despite this, Djourou returned to the starting line-up and helped the club finish tenth place in the league. At the end of the 2015–16 season, he went on to make 26 appearances and scoring two times in all competitions.

Ahead of the 2016–17 season, Djourou continued to regain his captaincy for Hamburger SV. However, he continued to plagued by injuries in the first four months to the season. As a result of his injuries, Djourou was replaced as captain by Gōtoku Sakai. He then helped the club keep two consecutive clean sheets between 4 December 2016 and 10 December 2016 against Darmstadt 98 and FC Augsburg. By the second half of the season, Djourou's first team opportunities soon became limited, due to his own injury concerns and competitions that saw him placed on the substitute bench. In late March, he was criticised for conducting an interview after criticising Manager Markus Gisdol and had to make an apology. Despite the apology, Djourou continued to remain on the sidelines for the rest of the 2016–17 season. At the end of the 2016–17 season, Djourou made sixteen appearances in all competitions.

Following this, he was among several players to be released by Hamburger SV after being told that their contract would not be renewed. Upon learning about this, Djourou made a statement on his social media account, thanking the club, players and teammates for making him a better player throughout his time at Hamburger SV.

=== Antalyaspor ===
On 7 August 2017, Djourou completed a free transfer to Antalyaspor after the expiry of his contract with Hamburg, signing a two-year contract with an option to extend the deal by 12 months.

After not appearing in the first two league matches of the season, he made his Antalyaspor debut, starting the whole game, in a 1–1 draw against Yeni Malatyaspor on 26 August 2017. Djourou then scored his first goal for the club, in a 3–1 loss against Sivasspor on 30 September 2017. Since making his debut for Antalyaspor, he started in the next six matches before suffering an injury that kept him out for three months. While on the sidelines, Djourou was linked with a move to Genoa but the club refused to let him go. It wasn't until on 12 February 2018 when he returned to the first team, coming on as a 78th-minute substitute, in a 3–0 loss against Galatasaray. Despite suffering from an illness, Djourou continued to regain his first team place for the rest of the 2017–18 season. At the end of the 2017–18 season, he went on to make eighteen appearances and scoring once in all competitions.

Following this, Djourou was among several players whose future at Antalyaspor was being reconsidered by the club's management, despite having a year left on his contract.

=== Later career ===
On 21 July 2018, Djourou signed with Italian Serie A club S.P.A.L. on a one-year contract with an option for a second year. He made his debut for the club, coming on as a second-half substitute, in a 1–0 loss against Torino on 2 September 2018. However, Djourou found his first team opportunities limited at S.P.A.L., due to competitions and his own injury concern. He made just six appearances before leaving by mutual consent in January 2019.

On 23 January 2020, Djourou completed a free transfer to Sion for the rest of the Swiss Super League season. He made his debut for the club, coming on as a 39th-minute substitute for the injured Jean Ruiz, in a 1–1 draw against FC Zürich on 2 February 2020. In a follow-up match against BSC Young Boys, however, Djourou suffered a muscle injury and was substituted in the 14th minute, as Sion lost 1–0. This turns out to be his last appearance for the club and made two appearances. He was one of nine players dismissed on 20 March for refusing a pay cut during the coronavirus pandemic. The dispute was eventually resolved in August after Djourou took the case to court.

Djourou then moved to Neuchâtel Xamax on 29 May 2020, together with fellow Sion dismissee Xavier Kouassi. He made his debut for the club, playing in the sweeper position, in a 2–1 win against FC Thun in the league's first match in three months. However, Djourou was plagued by injuries that affected most his time at Neuchâtel Xamax. Despite this, he went on to make seven appearances for the club.

On transfer deadline day, 5 October 2020, Djourou joined Danish Superliga club FC Nordsjælland on a two-year deal. He made his debut for the club in a Danish Cup match against FC Græsrødderne.

On 4 June 2021, Djourou announced his retirement at the age of 34. He cited physical pain from playing, as well as business interests in a football academy and a podcast.

== International career ==
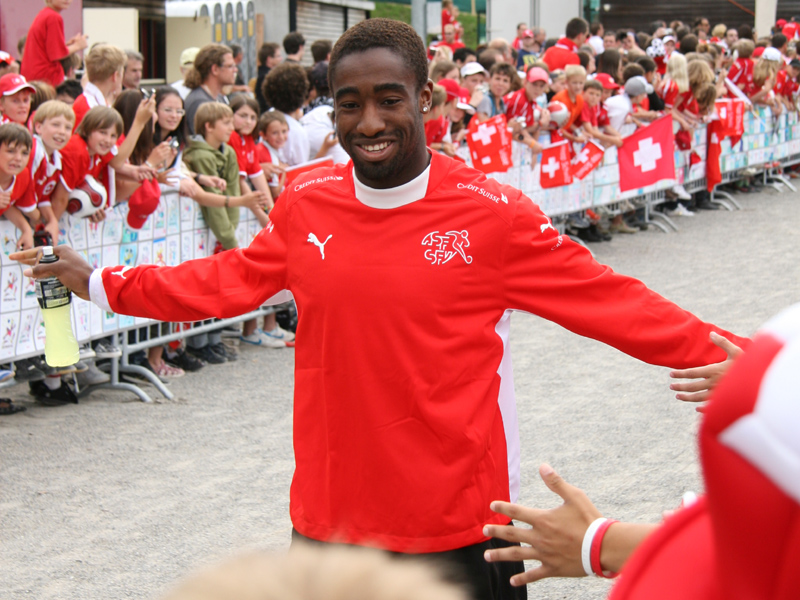
Djourou at Euro 2008 with Switzerland

=== Youth career ===
Djourou represented Switzerland up to the U21 levels.

He was a member of the Swiss under-19 squad that reached the semi-finals of the 2004 European Championships. Following the end of the tournament, UEFA said about Djourou's performance, saying: " A substitute in Switzerland's first three matches, he produced a fine display after coming on against Ukraine and was his country's best player in the semi-final defeat by Turkey." He went on to make eight appearances and scoring once for the U19 side.

The following year, Djourou was called up to the Switzerland U20 for the FIFA World Youth Championship in Netherlands. He went on to play three times in the tournament, as the U20 side were eliminated in the Group Stage.

In September 2006, Djourou made two appearances during Swiss U21's qualification campaign for the UEFA European Under-21 Championship qualification.

=== Senior career ===
Having been eligible to play for Switzerland and Ivory Coast, Djourou opted to play for Switzerland. He made his senior Switzerland international debut in a friendly away to Scotland on 1 March 2006, coming on as a half-time substitute for Valon Behrami in the 3–1 win.

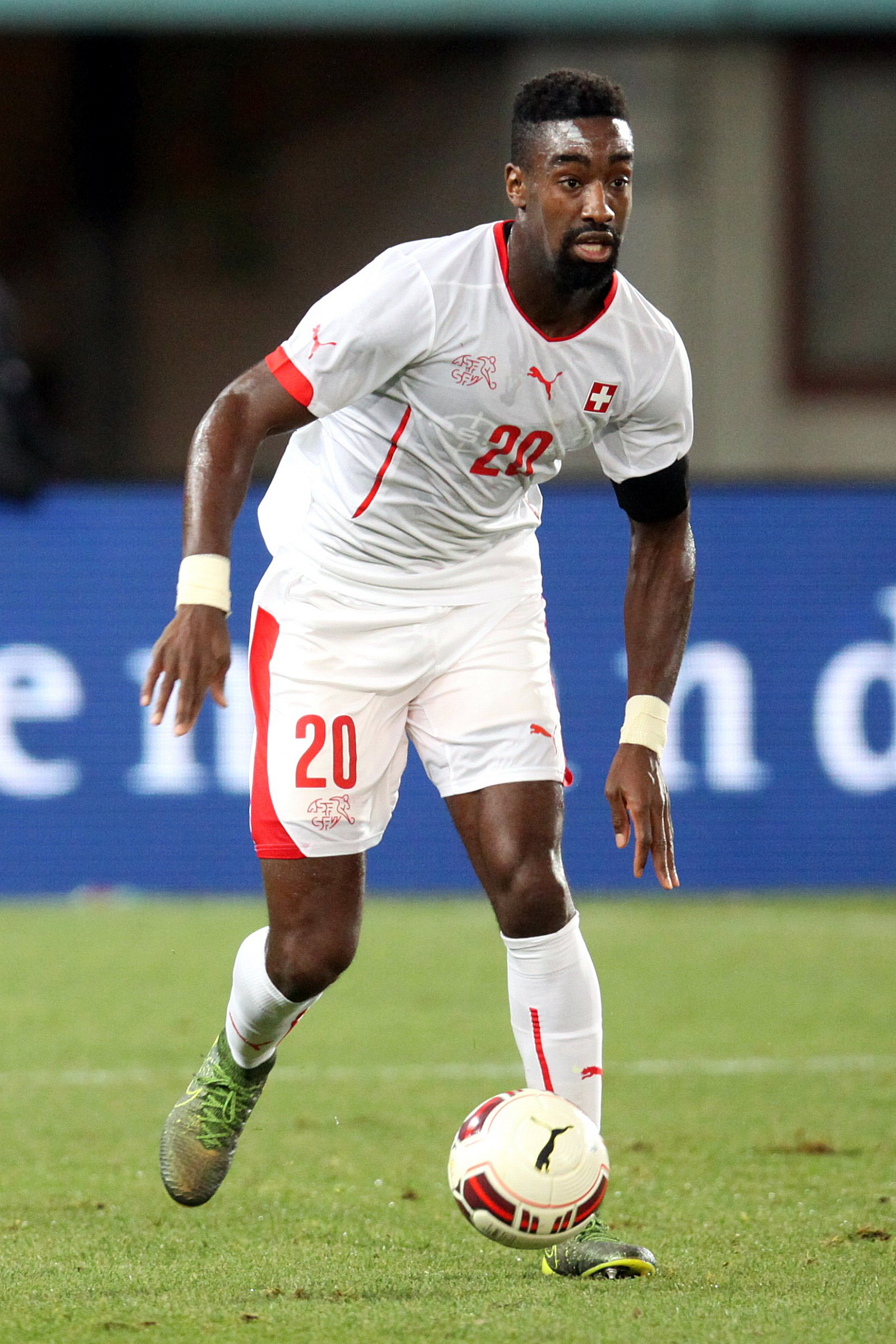
Djourou dribbling during Switzerland and Austria's match in November 2015

Djourou was called up to the Switzerland 2006 FIFA World Cup squad, despite not playing in the qualifiers. Upon being called up, he said: "It's going to be amazing because I was born in Ivory Coast and still feel there is an African part of me. My biological mother still lives there and I have a lot of contact by telephone with my family there, so if I am picked to play for Switzerland against my 'other country' it is sure to be a special moment. It's always something special to be the youngest in the team but I'm not taking that aspect too seriously as we're here to play football and for that age doesn't really matter," Djourou said. "My own goal for the World Cup is just to play and now I have to prepare myself to show the coach that I'm ready." His father successfully predicted that Djourou would play in the World Cup when he was ten. Djourou made his World Cup debut, coming on as 75th-minute substitute, in a 0–0 draw against France. He started Switzerland's round of 16 game against Ukraine, and was substituted injured in the first half.

The next two years saw Djourou continuing to feature in friendly matches for Switzerland. On 11 September 2007, he scored his first international goal to equalise near the end of a 4–3 loss to Japan in a tournament in Austria. Djourou was named in the Swiss squad for their co-hosting of UEFA Euro 2008. However, he was placed on the substitute bench throughout the tournament, as Switzerland were eliminated in the Group Stage.

Following the conclusion of UEFA Euro 2008, Djourou appeared five times for Switzerland for the rest of the year. After missing nearly the entire season for Arsenal in 2009–10, he was left out of the Swiss squad for the 2010 World Cup held in South Africa.

It wasn't until on 11 November 2010 when Djourou was called up to the Switzerland squad for the first time in over a year. He made his return to the national side, starting the whole game, in a 2–2 draw against Ukraine on 17 November 2010. Djourou's next appearance for Switzerland came on 4 June 2011, in a 2–2 draw against England. He then helped Switzerland keep two consecutive clean sheets between 11 October 2011 and 11 November 2011 against Montenegro and Netherlands.

At the start of the 2014 FIFA World Cup qualification, Djourou helped Switzerland go on a four match unbeaten by the end of the 2012. He then helped the national side keep three consecutive clean sheets between 6 February 2013 and 8 June 2013 against Greece and Cyprus. Djourou then helped Switzerland qualify for the World Cup after winning 2–1 against Albania on 11 October 2013. Manager Vladimir Petković named him in the 23-man squad for the finals in Brazil, having made it on two occasions. For the 2014 FIFA World Cup in Brazil, he played all four games as the Swiss reached the last 16. Following the end of the tournament, Aargauer Zeitung made an evaluation of his performance.

Following the conclusion of the World Cup, Djourou kept four clean sheets for the national side between 14 October 2014 and 10 June 2015 during his playing time in Switzerland's four of the six matches. On 9 October 2015, Djourou scored his only other international goal in a 7–0 win over San Marino in St. Gallen for UEFA Euro 2016 qualifying, netting a penalty kick after Fabian Schär was fouled. The result took the Swiss to the finals in France. Once again, Manager Petković chose him in the 23-man squad for the finals in France. In the summer's tournament, he played all four games of a run to the last 16, where Switzerland were eliminated in a 1–1 draw and penalty shootout against Poland.

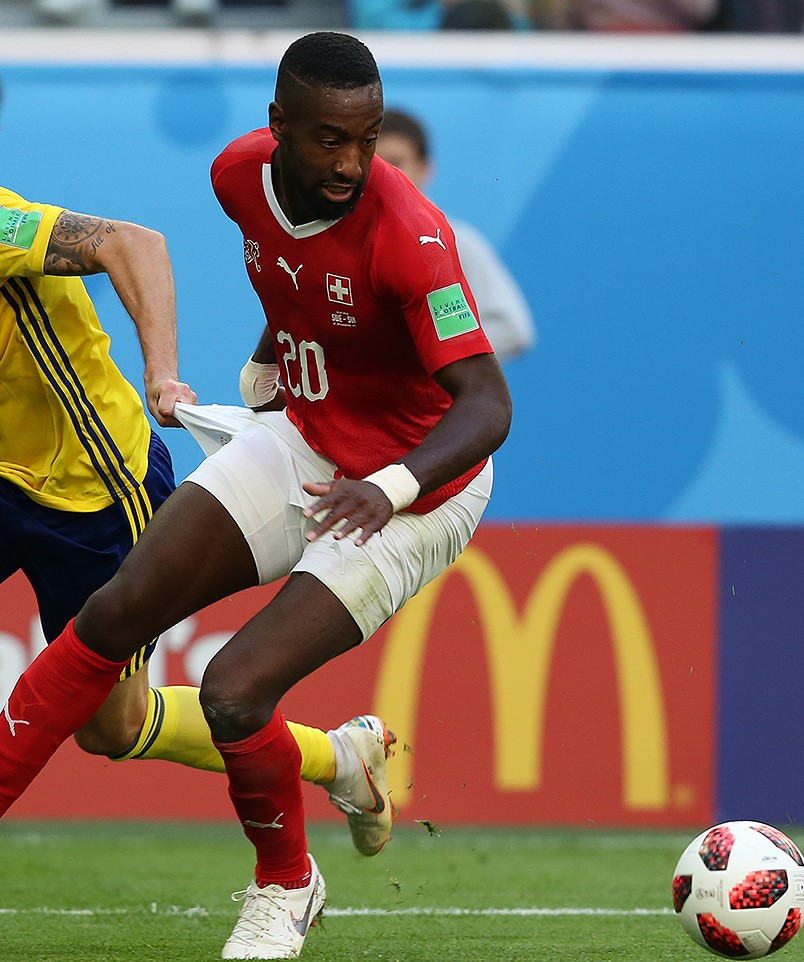
Djourou making his only FIFA World Cup's appearance in Russia, coming against Sweden in the last 16

Following the conclusion of the UEFA Euro 2016, Djourou, once again, kept four clean sheets for the national side between 6 September 2016 and 3 September 2017 during his playing time in Switzerland's six of the nine matches. Despite missing out in play-offs, Switzerland went on to qualify for the World Cup after beating Northern Ireland 1–0 on aggregate. He was part of Vladimir Petković's 23-man squad for the 2018 FIFA World Cup in Russia. Djourou played only the 1–0 loss to Sweden in the last 16 at the Saint Petersburg Stadium, where he filled in for the suspended Fabian Schär. He made one more appearance by the end of the year, starting the whole game, in a 1–0 loss against England on 11 September 2018.

== Personal life ==
Djourou's younger brother, Olivier, was playing football for Urania Genève Sport in 2008. He also has two sisters. Djourou married his long-term girlfriend, Emile, and together, they have three daughters.

In addition to speaking German and French, Djourou speaks English, having learnt from his time in England. He is good friends with Fabrice Muamba, having been teammates at Arsenal and Birmingham City. In February 2014, Djourou, along with teammate Jacques Zoua, had their watches stolen during HSV's training camp in Austria.

Djourou said in an interview that he would like to become an actor once his playing career is over. Regarding his nationality, Djourou said: "I am so happy and grateful that I have both of them and that I can combine the best of both cultures. I am 100 percent African. That includes eating, dancing, music. And I'm also 100 percent Swiss, very punctual and disciplined when it matters."

== Career statistics ==
=== Club ===
Appearances and goals by club, season and competition
Club	Season	League			Cup		League Cup		Europe		Total	
Club	Season	Division	Apps	Goals	Apps	Goals	Apps	Goals	Apps	Goals	Apps	Goals
Arsenal	2004–05	Premier League	0	0	0	0	3	0	0	0	3	0
Arsenal	2005–06	Premier League	7	0	2	0	3	0	0	0	12	0
Arsenal	2006–07	Premier League	21	0	1	0	3	0	5	0	30	0
Arsenal	2007–08	Premier League	2	0	0	0	1	0	0	0	3	0
Arsenal	2008–09	Premier League	15	0	4	0	2	0	8	0	29	0
Arsenal	2009–10	Premier League	1	0	0	0	0	0	0	0	1	0
Arsenal	2010–11	Premier League	22	1	3	0	6	0	6	0	37	1
Arsenal	2011–12	Premier League	18	0	1	0	2	0	6	0	27	0
Arsenal	2012–13	Premier League	0	0	0	0	2	0	0	0	2	0
Arsenal	Total		86	1	11	0	22	0	25	0	140	1
Birmingham City (loan)	2007–08	Premier League	13	0	0	0	0	0	0	0	13	0
Hannover 96 (loan)	2012–13	Bundesliga	14	0	0	0	–		2	0	16	0
Hamburger SV (loan)	2013–14	Bundesliga	24	0	2	0	–		–		26	0
Hamburger SV	2014–15	Bundesliga	34	0	2	0	–		–		36	0
Hamburger SV	2015–16	Bundesliga	26	2	0	0	–		–		26	2
Hamburger SV	2016–17	Bundesliga	14	0	2	0	–		–		16	0
Hamburger SV	Total		98	2	6	0	0	0	0	0	104	2
Antalyaspor	2017–18	Süper Lig	18	1	0	0	–		–		18	1
SPAL	2018–19	Serie A	5	0	1	0	–		–		6	0
Sion	2019–20	Swiss Super League	2	0	0	0	–		–		2	0
Neuchâtel Xamax	2019–20	Swiss Super League	5	0	0	0	–		–		5	0
Nordsjælland	2020–21	Danish Superliga	11	0	1	0	–		–		9	0
Career total			248	4	19	0	22	0	27	0	318	4

=== International ===
Appearances and goals by national team and year
National team	Year	Apps	Goals
Switzerland	2006	8	0
Switzerland	2007	8	1
Switzerland	2008	6	0
Switzerland	2009	2	0
Switzerland	2010	1	0
Switzerland	2011	5	0
Switzerland	2012	8	0
Switzerland	2013	4	0
Switzerland	2014	10	0
Switzerland	2015	7	1
Switzerland	2016	7	0
Switzerland	2017	6	0
Switzerland	2018	4	0
Total		76	2

Scores and results list Switzerland's goal tally first, score column indicates score after each Djourou goal.

List of international goals scored by Johan Djourou
No.	Date	Venue	Opponent	Score	Result	Competition
1	11 September 2007	Wörthersee Stadion, Klagenfurt, Austria	Japan	3–3	3–4	Friendly
2	9 October 2015	AFG Arena, St. Gallen, Switzerland	San Marino	4–0	7–0	UEFA Euro 2016 qualification

== Honours ==
Arsenal

- Football League Cup runner-up: 2006–07, 2010–11

Individual

- Swiss Sports Awards: Best Newcomer 2006
