= 2010–11 Hamburger SV season =

Hamburger SV
2010–11 season
- Manager: Armin Veh (23 May 2010 – 13 March 2011); Michael Oenning (from 13 March 2011)
- Bundesliga: 8th
- DFB-Pokal: Second round
- Top goalscorer: League: Mladen Petrić (11); All: Mladen Petrić (13)
Home colours	Away colours	Third colours

The 2010–11 season of Hamburger SV began on 28 June with their first training session. Hamburg played its matches at Imtech Arena.

Hamburg hired Armin Veh as their new head coach after sacking Bruno Labbadia near the end of last season and appointed Bastian Reinhardt as their new sports director. Hamburg were interested in a number of big name players, including Rafinha of Schalke 04, Michael Ballack, who Chelsea deemed surplus, Serdar Tasci of VfB Stuttgart and Jaroslav Drobný. Out of all of those, only Drobný decided to sign with Hamburg. Jérôme Boateng was the only major player sold, leaving for Manchester City.

The signings continued during pre-season. Hamburg signed Dennis Diekmeier from 1. FC Nürnberg and Heiko Westermann from Schalke 04.

== Season ==
In September 2010, Hamburger SV and FC St. Pauli played their first derby in eight years. The match ended in a 1–1 draw.

Hamburg club president Bernd Hoffmann had come under pressure for poor club results. Bernd Hoffmann came under pressure after Hamburg lost 4–2 to Bayer Leverkusen. A group of fans protested against recent results outside the club headquarters by demanding Bernd Hoffmann resignation. Head coach Armin Veh said Hoffmann should not be blamed and the coaching staff and the playing staff collectively should be blamed for the bad results. Supervisory board Horst Becker resigned on 13 December 2010 and stated that he would not seek re-election for the position.

Wigan Athletic contacted Hamburg about a possible loan move for Dutch winger Eljero Elia. Eljero Elia had fallen out of favour at Hamburg. Sporting director Bastian Reinhardt had confirmed that Wigan offered to take Elia on loan for half-a-season.

Ruud van Nistelrooy had confirmed that Real Madrid were interested in signing him. On 23 January 2011, Hamburg rejected a transfer worth more than €2 million plus a friendly match. President Hoffmann stated that Hamburg were looking to get back into Europe and it would be "impossible" to allow him to leave the club. It became publicly known that Ruud van Nistelrooy wasn't happy about Hamburg rejecting the transfer offer from Real Madrid and he has ruled out a contract extension with Hamburger SV.

In January 2011, Matthias Sammer rejected a job offer from Hamburg. The job would have been similar to the one he has with the German Football Association (DFB).

On 5 February 2011, Hamburg and St. Pauli fans fought each other after the match between the two clubs was postponed due to rain. Up to 200 hooligans threw bottles and fireworks at police. One person was arrested and 45 people taken into custody. The police had been expecting violence ahead of the derby. Police and stadium workers had discovered fireworks attached to seats in the stands of Imtech Arena in the days leading up to the originally scheduled match.

On 13 March 2011, the day after a 6–0 loss to Bayern Munich, Hamburg fired head coach Armin Veh and assistant coach Reiner Geyer. Michael Oenning was named interim head coach and Rudolfo Cardoso assistant coach. Originally, Veh was going to leave the club after the season.

== Players ==
=== First-team squad ===
Squad at end of season

Note: Flags indicate national team as defined under FIFA eligibility rules; some limited exceptions apply. Players may hold more than one non-FIFA nationality.

No.	Pos.	Nation	Player
1	GK	GER	Frank Rost
2	DF	GER	Dennis Diekmeier
4	DF	GER	Heiko Westermann (captain)
5	DF	NED	Joris Mathijsen
6	DF	GER	Dennis Aogo
7	DF	GER	Marcell Jansen
8	MF	BRA	Zé Roberto
9	FW	PER	Paolo Guerrero
10	FW	CRO	Mladen Petrić (Note: Petrić was born in Brčko, Yugoslavia (now Bosnia and Herzegovina), but was raised in Switzerland and also qualified to represent Croatia internationally and represented Switzerland at U-17 and U-21 level before making his international debut for Croatia in November 2001.)
11	MF	NED	Eljero Elia
13	MF	GER	Robert Tesche
14	MF	CZE	David Jarolím
15	MF	GER	Piotr Trochowski (Note: Trochowski was born in Tczew, Poland, but was raised in Germany from the age of 5 and made his international debut for Germany in October 2002.)
17	FW	CMR	Eric Maxim Choupo-Moting (Note: Choupo-Moting was born in Hamburg, West Germany, and represented Germany at U-19 and U-21 level, but also qualified to represent Cameroon internationally through his father and made his international debut for Cameroon in June 2010.)
18	MF	NED	Romeo Castelen (Note: Castelen was born in Paramaribo, Suriname, but also qualified to represent the Netherlands internationally and made his international debut for the Netherlands in August 2004.)

No.	Pos.	Nation	Player
19	DF	GER	Lennard Sowah
20	DF	CIV	Guy Demel (Note: Demel was born in Orsay, France, but also qualified to represent the Ivory Coast internationally and made his international debut for the Ivory Coast in 2004.)
21	MF	BFA	Jonathan Pitroipa
22	FW	NED	Ruud van Nistelrooy
25	MF	VEN	Tomás Rincón
29	GK	GER	Tom Mickel
30	DF	NAM	Collin Benjamin
31	MF	TUN	Änis Ben-Hatira (Note: Ben-Hatira was born in West Berlin, West Germany, and represented Germany at U-19, U-20 and U-21 level, but also qualified to represent Tunisia internationally and made his international debut for Tunisia in February 2012.)
33	DF	CZE	Miroslav Štěpánek
34	MF	BIH	Muhamed Bešić (Note: Bešić was born in Berlin, Germany, but also qualified to represent Bosnia and Herzegovina internationally and represented Bosnia and Herzegovina at U-21 level before making his international debut for Bosnia and Herzegovina in November 2010.)
35	FW	TUR	Tunay Torun (Note: Torun was born in Hamburg, West Germany (now Germany), but also qualified to represent Turkey internationally and represented Turkey at U-15, U-16, U-17, U-18, U-21 and B level before making his international debut for Turkey in February 2011.)
36	MF	GER	Hanno Behrens
40	FW	KOR	Son Heung-min
44	MF	SRB	Gojko Kačar
45	GK	CZE	Jaroslav Drobný

=== Left club during season ===
Note: Flags indicate national team as defined under FIFA eligibility rules; some limited exceptions apply. Players may hold more than one non-FIFA nationality.

No.	Pos.	Nation	Player
3	DF	CZE	David Rozehnal (on loan to Lille)
12	GK	GER	Wolfgang Hesl (on loan to SV Ried)

No.	Pos.	Nation	Player
41	DF	GER	Gerrit Pressel (on loan to Willem II)

== Competitions ==
=== Bundesliga ===
==== League table ====
Pos	Team	Pld	W	D	L	GF	GA	GD	Pts
6	1. FC Nürnberg	34	13	8	13	47	45	+2	47
7	1. FC Kaiserslautern	34	13	7	14	48	51	−3	46
8	Hamburger SV	34	12	9	13	46	52	−6	45
9	SC Freiburg	34	13	5	16	41	50	−9	44
10	1. FC Köln	34	13	5	16	47	62	−15	44

Source: kicker
Rules for classification: 1) points; 2) goal difference; 3) number of goals scored.

==== Matches ====
Win Draw Loss

21 August 2010 1	Hamburger SV	2–1	Schalke 04	Hamburg
18:30 CEST	Van Nistelrooy 46', 83', (yellow card) 47'; Zé Roberto (yellow card) 84'	Report	Höwedes (yellow card) 53' (yellow-red card) 60'; Farfán 80'	Stadium: Imtech Arena; Attendance: 57,000; Referee: Wolfgang Stark

28 August 2010 2	Eintracht Frankfurt	1–3	Hamburger SV	Frankfurt
15:30 CEST	Schwegler (yellow card) 30'; Franz (yellow card) 35'; Ochs 37'	Report	Mathijsen 61'; Jansen (yellow card) 73'; Van Nistelrooy 81'; Guerrero 89'	Stadium: Commerzbank Arena; Attendance: 51,500; Referee: Felix Zwayer

11 September 2010 3	Hamburger SV	1–1	1. FC Nürnberg	Hamburg
15:30 CEST	Demel (yellow card) 38'; Trochowski (yellow card) 43'; Mathijsen 61'; Kačar (yellow card) 90+2'	Report	Nilsson (yellow card) 26'; Wolfs (yellow card) 65'; Pinola 82' (pen.), (yellow card) 89'	Stadium: Imtech Arena; Attendance: 54,099; Referee: Markus Wingenbach

19 September 2010 4	FC St. Pauli	1–1	Hamburger SV	Hamburg
15:30 CEST	Oczipka (yellow card) 33'; Lehmann (yellow card) 45+2'; Boll 77'	Report	Guerrero (yellow card) 34'; Rincón (yellow card) 60'; Petrić 88'	Stadium: Millerntor-Stadion; Attendance: 23,794; Referee: Florian Meyer

22 September 2010 5	Hamburger SV	1–3	VfL Wolfsburg	Hamburg
20:00 CEST	Choupo-Moting 27'	Report	Džeko 15'; Grafite 71', 78'	Stadium: Imtech Arena; Attendance: 50,231; Referee: Günter Perl

25 September 2010 6	Werder Bremen	3–2	Hamburger SV	Bremen
18:30 CEST	Demel 25' (o.g.); Almeida 28', 85'; Wiese (yellow card) 90+1'; Marin (yellow card) 90+2'	Report	Elia (yellow card) 31'; Rincón (yellow card) 36'; Van Nistelrooy 59'; Pitroipa 63'	Stadium: Weserstadion; Attendance: 35,000; Referee: Thorsten Kinhöfer

2 October 2010 7	Hamburger SV	2–1	1. FC Kaiserslautern	Hamburg
15:30 CEST	Mathijsen (yellow card) 7'; Kačar 70'; Choupo-Moting 84'	Report	Lakić 3', (yellow card) 7'; Dick (yellow card) 45+1'	Stadium: Imtech Arena; Attendance: 57,000; Referee: Guido Winkmann

16 October 2010 8	Mainz 05	0–1	Hamburger SV	Mainz
15:30 CEST	Polanski (yellow card) 53'	Report	Kačar (yellow card) 32'; Van Nistelrooy (yellow card) 77'; Zé Roberto (yellow card) 77'; Guerrero 89'	Stadium: Stadion am Bruchweg; Attendance: 20,300; Referee: Felix Brych

22 October 2010 9	Hamburger SV	0–0	Bayern Munich	Hamburg
20:30 CEST	Mathijsen (yellow card) 23'	Report	Pranjić (yellow card) 27'; Schweinsteiger (yellow card) 45+2'	Stadium: Imtech Arena; Attendance: 57,000; Referee: Manuel Gräfe

30 October 2010 10	1. FC Köln	3–2	Hamburger SV	Cologne
15:30 CEST	Novaković 11', 29', 84'; Geromel (yellow card) 63'; Jajalo (yellow card) 90'	Report	Petrić 15'; Son 24'; Mathijsen (yellow card) 40'; Kačar (yellow card) 90+1'	Stadium: RheinEnergieStadion; Attendance: 50,000; Referee: Babak Rafati

6 November 2010 11	Hamburger SV	2–1	1899 Hoffenheim	Hamburg
15:30 CET	Westermann 45'; Jarolím (yellow card) 64'; Petrić 83'	Report	Salihović 6' (pen.); Luiz Gustavo (yellow card) 26'; Beck (yellow card) 32'; Compper (yellow card) 51'; Mlapa (yellow card) 79'	Stadium: Imtech Arena; Attendance: 53,000; Referee: Günter Perl

12 November 2010 12	Borussia Dortmund	2–0	Hamburger SV	Dortmund
20:30 CET	Kagawa 49'; Barrios 70'	Report	Jarolím (yellow card) 85'	Stadium: Signal Iduna Park; Attendance: 80,720; Referee: Deniz Aytekin

20 November 2010 13	Hannover 96	3–2	Hamburger SV	Hanover
15:30 CET	Stindl 31'; Schlaudraff (yellow card) 56'; Schulz 59'; Pinto (yellow card) 86'; Hanke 90+1'	Report	Son 40', 54'; Guerrero (yellow card) 56'; Zé Roberto (yellow card) 69'; Trochowski (yellow card) 76'; Choupo-Moting (yellow card) 90+3'	Stadium: AWD-Arena; Attendance: 49,000; Referee: Jochen Drees

27 November 2010 14	Hamburger SV	4–2	VfB Stuttgart	Hamburg
15:30 CET	Trochowski 3'; Pitroipa 29'; Petrić 36', (yellow card) 82'; Jarolím (yellow card) 51'; Van Nistelrooy 60'	Report	Marica 9', (yellow card) 15' (red card) 16'; Niedermeyer (yellow card) 15'; Gentner 46'; Ulreich (yellow card) 60'	Stadium: Imtech Arena; Attendance: 53,055; Referee: Wolfgang Stark

4 December 2010 15	SC Freiburg	1–0	Hamburger SV	Freiburg
15:30 CET	Cissé 3', (yellow card) 76'	Report		Stadium: Badenova-Stadion; Attendance: 22,000; Referee: Tobias Welz

11 December 2010 16	Hamburger SV	2–4	Bayer Leverkusen	Hamburg
15:30 CET	Benjamin (yellow card) 37'; Vidal 48' (o.g.); Jarolím (yellow card) 59'; Elia 79'; Van Nistelrooy (yellow card) 90+2'	Report	Reinartz (yellow card) 12'; Kadlec (yellow card) 26'; Sam 30', (yellow card) 59'; Vidal 61'; Augusto 66', 78'	Stadium: Imtech Arena; Attendance: 51,225; Referee: Felix Zwayer

17 December 2010 17	Borussia Mönchengladbach	1–2	Hamburger SV	Mönchengladbach
20:30 CET	De Camargo 48'; Schachten (yellow card) 71'	Report	Elia 46'; Trochowski 72'	Stadium: Borussia-Park; Attendance: 42,253; Referee: Günter Perl

15 January 2011 18	Schalke 04	0–1	Hamburger SV	Gelsenkirchen
18:30 CET	Edu (yellow card) 59'; Jurado (yellow card) 65'; Schmitz (yellow card) 90+1'	Report	Westermann (yellow card) 40'; Van Nistelrooy 53', (yellow card) 65'; Jarolím (yellow card) 81'	Stadium: Veltins-Arena; Attendance: 61,673; Referee: Knut Kircher

21 January 2011 19	Hamburger SV	1–0	Eintracht Frankfurt	Hamburg
20:30 CET	Petrić 65'	Report		Stadium: Imtech Arena; Attendance: 50,239; Referee: Wolfgang Stark

29 January 2011 20	1. FC Nürnberg	2–0	Hamburger SV	Nuremberg
15:30 CET	Simons 59' (pen.); Cohen 70'; Wolf (yellow card) 90+3'	Report	Jarolím (yellow card) 45+2'; Rost (yellow card) 58'; Kačar (red card) 69'	Stadium: EasyCredit-Stadion; Attendance: 35,000; Referee: Tobias Welz

6 February 2011 ~~21~~	Hamburger SV	Postponed	FC St. Pauli	Hamburg
				Stadium: Imtech Arena

12 February 2011 21	VfL Wolfsburg	0–1	Hamburger SV	Wolfsburg
15:30 CET	Kjær (yellow card) 32'; Grafite (yellow card) 60'; Polák (yellow card) 67'; Friedrich (yellow card) 73'	Report	Petrić 33' (pen.); Aogo (yellow card) 90+2'	Stadium: Volkswagen Arena; Attendance: 30,000; Referee: Marco Fritz

16 February 2011 22	Hamburger SV	0–1	FC St. Pauli	Hamburg
18:45 CET	Jarolím (yellow card) 32'; Zé Roberto (yellow card) 36'; Westermann (yellow card) 90+1'; Demel (yellow card) 90+2'	Report	Asamoah 59'; Zambrano (yellow card) 75'; Daube (yellow card) 88'	Stadium: Imtech Arena; Attendance: 57,000; Referee: Günter Perl

19 February 2011 23	Hamburger SV	4–0	Werder Bremen	Hamburg
15:30 CET	Aogo (yellow card) 18'; Son (yellow card) 33'; Petrić 42'; Guerrero 64', 79'; Ben-Hatira 87'; Westermann (yellow card) 90'	Report	Arnautović (yellow card) 34'; Frings (yellow card) 40'; Schmidt (yellow card) 78'	Stadium: Imtech Arena; Attendance: 54,000; Referee: Florian Meyer

26 February 2011 24	1. FC Kaiserslautern	1–1	Hamburger SV	Kaiserslautern
15:30 CET	Hloušek 18', (yellow card) 76'; Morávek (yellow card) 48'; Lakić (yellow card) 58'	Report	Jansen 54'	Stadium: Fritz Walter Stadion; Attendance: 46,000; Referee: Felix Brych

6 March 2011 25	Hamburger SV	2–4	Mainz 05	Hamburg
17:30 CET	Jansen 17'; Mathijsen (yellow card) 34'; Pitroipa (yellow card) 45'; Petrić 59'	Report	Svensson (yellow card) 55'; Schürrle 56', 82'; Risse 61'; Polanski (yellow card) 74'; Heller 88'	Stadium: Imtech Arena; Attendance: 49,462; Referee: Babak Rafati

12 March 2011 26	Bayern Munich	6–0	Hamburger SV	Munich
15:30 CET	Robben 40', 47', 55'; Ribéry 64', (yellow card) 64'; Müller 79'; Klose (yellow card) 84'; Westermann 85' (o.g.)	Report	Guerrero (yellow card) 65'	Stadium: Allianz Arena; Attendance: 69,000; Referee: Michael Weiner

19 March 2011 27	Hamburger SV	6–2	1. FC Köln	Hamburg
15:30 CET	Petrić 12', 38', 43'; Ben-Hatira 32'; Kačar 52'; Zé Roberto 58' (pen.); Van Nistelrooy (yellow card) 65'	Report	Jajalo 50'; Lanig (yellow card) 53'; Novaković (yellow card) 57'; Podolski 62'	Stadium: Imtech Arena; Attendance: 57,000; Referee: Robert Hartmann

2 April 2011 28	1899 Hoffenheim	0–0	Hamburger SV	Sinsheim
18:30 CET	Ibišević (yellow card) 70'; Rudy (yellow card) 89'	Report	Diekmeier (yellow card) 54'	Stadium: Rhein-Neckar-Arena; Attendance: 30,150; Referee: Tobias Welz

9 April 2011 29	Hamburger SV	1–1	Borussia Dortmund	Hamburg
15:30 CET	Ben-Hatira (yellow card) 26' (yellow-red card) 78'; Van Nistelrooy 39' (pen.)	Report	Şahin (yellow card) 21'; Błaszczykowski 90+2'	Stadium: Imtech Arena; Attendance: 57,000; Referee: Peter Gagelmann

16 April 2011 30	Hamburger SV	0–0	Hannover 96	Hamburg
15:30 CET	Jarolím (yellow card) 79'	Report	Stindl (yellow card) 69'; Ya Konan (yellow card) 78'; Pinto (yellow card) 79'	Stadium: Imtech Arena; Attendance: 57,000; Referee: Christian Dingert

23 April 2011 31	VfB Stuttgart	3–0	Hamburger SV	Stuttgart
15:30 CET	Cacau 6', 89'; Ulreich (yellow card) 37'; Molinaro (yellow card) 42'; Gentner 78'	Report		Stadium: Mercedes-Benz Arena; Attendance: 39,000; Referee: Thorsten Kinhöfer

30 April 2011 32	Hamburger SV	0–2	SC Freiburg	Hamburg
15:30 CET	Jarolím (yellow card) 45+3'; Zé Roberto (yellow card) 69'; Aogo (yellow card) 84'	Report	Cissé 16', 88'; Mujdža (yellow card) 77'	Stadium: Imtech Arena; Attendance: 52,985; Referee: Guido Winkmann

7 May 2011 33	Bayer Leverkusen	1–1	Hamburger SV	Leverkusen, NW
15:30 CET	Vidal (yellow card) 48'; Kießling 53'	Report	Westermann 2', (yellow card) 77'; Jarolím (yellow card) 37'; Guerrero (yellow card) 68'	Stadium: BayArena; Attendance: 30,210; Referee: Tobias Welz

14 May 2011 34	Hamburger SV	1–1	Borussia Mönchengladbach	Hamburg
15:30 CET	Ben-Hatira (yellow card) 24', (goal) 71'	Report	Arango 42', (yellow card) 62'; Stranzl (yellow card) 74'	Stadium: Imtech Arena; Attendance: 57,000; Referee: Manuel Gräfe

=== DFB Cup ===
15 August 2010 First round	Torgelower SV Greif	1–5	Hamburger SV	Torgelow
17:30 CEST	Pankau 43'; Novacic (yellow card) 56'	Report	Van Nistelrooy 34', 65', 67'; Guerrero 53'; Jarolím 81'	Stadium: Gießerei-Arena; Attendance: 8,000; Referee: Manuel Gräfe

27 October 2010 Second round	Eintracht Frankfurt	5–2	Hamburger SV	Frankfurt
19:00 CEST	Caio 13'; Gekas 21', 45'; Petrić 65' (o.g.); Altıntop 87' (pen.)	Report	Petrić 23', 66'; Rincón (yellow card) 87'	Stadium: Commerzbank-Arena; Attendance: 39,400; Referee: Florian Meyer

== Transfers ==
In:

No.	Pos.	Nation	Player
2	DF	GER	Dennis Diekmeier (from 1. FC Nürnberg)
4	DF	GER	Heiko Westermann (from Schalke 04)
17	FW	CMR	Eric Maxim Choupo-Moting (loan return from 1. FC Nürnberg)
19	DF	GER	Lennard Sowah (from Portsmouth)
28	MF	SEN	Mickaël Tavares (Note: Tavares was born in Villeneuve-Saint-Georges, France, but also qualified to represent Cape Verde and Senegal internationally through his mother and father respectively and was called up by Cape Verde in May 2008 before making his international debut for Senegal in 2009.) (loan return from 1. FC Nürnberg)
32	MF	GER	Änis Ben-Hatira (Note: Ben-Hatira was born in West Berlin, West Germany (now Berlin, Germany), and represented Germany at U-19, U-20, and U-21 level, but also qualified to represent Tunisia internationally and made his international debut for Tunisia in February 2012.) (loan return from MSV Duisburg)
44	MF	SRB	Gojko Kačar (from Hertha BSC)
45	GK	CZE	Jaroslav Drobný (from Hertha BSC)

Out:

No.	Pos.	Nation	Player
3	DF	CZE	David Rozehnal (on loan to Lille)
4	DF	GER	Bastian Reinhardt (retired).
12	GK	GER	Wolfgang Hesl (on loan to SV Ried)
16	FW	SWE	Marcus Berg (on loan to PSV)
17	DF	GER	Jérôme Boateng (to Manchester City)
19	MF	GER	Tolgay Arslan (Note: Arslan was born in Paderborn, Germany, but also qualified to represent Turkey internationally and represented Turkey at U-19 and U-21 level before representing Germany at U-20 and U-21 level.) (on loan to Alemannia Aachen)
28	MF	SEN	Mickaël Tavares (on loan to Middlesbrough)
31	FW	GER	Maximilian Beister (on loan to Fortuna Düsseldorf)
32	MF	GER	Änis Ben-Hatira (to Hamburger SV II)
34	DF	GER	Kai-Fabian Schulz (on loan to FSV Frankfurt)
—	MF	GER	Sidney Sam (to Bayer Leverkusen, previously on loan at 1. FC Kaiserslautern)

== Statistics ==
=== Appearances and goals ===
As of 22 January 2011
Reference: Soccernet

No.	Pos	Nat	Player	Total		Bundesliga		DFB Cup	
No.	Pos	Nat	Player	Apps	Goals	Apps	Goals	Apps	Goals
1	GK	(Germany) GER	Frank Rost	16	0	15	0	1	0
29	GK	(Germany) GER	Tom Mickel	0	0	0	0	0	0
45	GK	(Czech Republic) CZE	Jaroslav Drobný	6	0	5	0	1	0
2	DF	(Germany) GER	Dennis Diekmeier	0	0	0	0	0	0
4	DF	(Germany) GER	Heiko Westermann	21	1	19	1	2	0
5	DF	(Netherlands) NED	Joris Mathijsen	14	2	12	2	2	0
6	DF	(Germany) GER	Dennis Aogo	5	0	5	0	0	0
7	DF	(Germany) GER	Marcell Jansen	9	0	8	0	1	0
19	DF	(Germany) GER	Lennard Sowah	0	0	0	0	0	0
20	DF	(Ivory Coast) CIV	Guy Demel	15	1	13	1	2	0
30	DF	(Namibia) NAM	Collin Benjamin	4	0	4	0	0	0
33	DF	(Czech Republic) CZE	Miroslav Štěpánek	0	0	0	0	0	0
34	DF	(Bosnia and Herzegovina) BIH	Muhamed Bešić	3	0	3	0	0	0
8	MF	(Brazil) BRA	Zé Roberto	19	0	17	0	2	0
11	MF	(Netherlands) NED	Eljero Elia	13	2	12	2	1	0
13	MF	(Germany) GER	Robert Tesche	7	0	6	0	1	0
14	MF	(Czech Republic) CZE	David Jarolím	15	1	14	0	1	1
15	MF	(Germany) GER	Piotr Trochowski	19	2	18	2	1	0
18	MF	(Netherlands) NED	Romeo Castelen	0	0	0	0	0	0
21	MF	(Burkina Faso) BFA	Jonathan Pitroipa	20	2	18	2	2	0
25	MF	(Venezuela) VEN	Tomás Rincón	18	0	16	0	2	0
31	MF	(Germany) GER	Änis Ben-Hatira	4	0	4	0	0	0
36	MF	(Germany) GER	Hanno Behrens	0	0	0	0	0	0
44	MF	(Serbia) SRB	Gojko Kačar	11	1	11	1	0	0
9	FW	(Peru) PER	Paolo Guerrero	15	3	13	2	2	1
10	FW	(Croatia) CRO	Mladen Petrić	12	8	10	5	2	3
17	FW	(Cameroon) CMR	Eric Maxim Choupo-Moting	12	2	10	2	2	0
22	FW	(Netherlands) NED	Ruud van Nistelrooy	17	9	16	6	1	3
35	FW	(Turkey) TUR	Tunay Torun	4	3	2	0	2	3
40	FW	(South Korea) KOR	Son Heung-min	8	3	7	3	1	0

== Coaching staff ==
Position	Staff
Head coach	(Germany) Armin Veh
Assistant coach	(Germany) Reiner Geyer
Assistant coach	(Germany) Michael Oenning
Goalkeeping coach	(Germany) Ronny Teuber
Fitness coach	(Germany) Manfred Düring
Fitness coach	(Germany) Markus Günther

Last updated: 17 December 2010
Source: Hamburger SV official website

== Kits ==
Home	Home Alternate	Home Alt. 2	Away	Away Alternate	Away Alt. 2	Away Alt. 3	Third

Type	Shirt	Shorts	Socks	First appearance / Info
Home	White	Red	Blue	
Home Alt.	White	White	White	Bundesliga, Match 24, 26 February against Kaiserslautern
Home Alt. 2	White	White	White	Bundesliga, Match 33, 7 May against Leverkusen → 2009–10 Home Alt. Shorts
Away	Blue	White	Black	→ No appearance
Away Alt.	Blue	Black	Black	Bundesliga, Match 8, 16 October against Mainz 05
Away Alt. 2	Blue	White	White	Bundesliga, Match 20, 29 January against Nürnberg
Away Alt. 3	Blue	Black	White	Bundesliga, Match 26, 12 March against Munich
Third	Red	Red	Red	
