= Mladen Petrić =

Croatian footballer (born 1981)

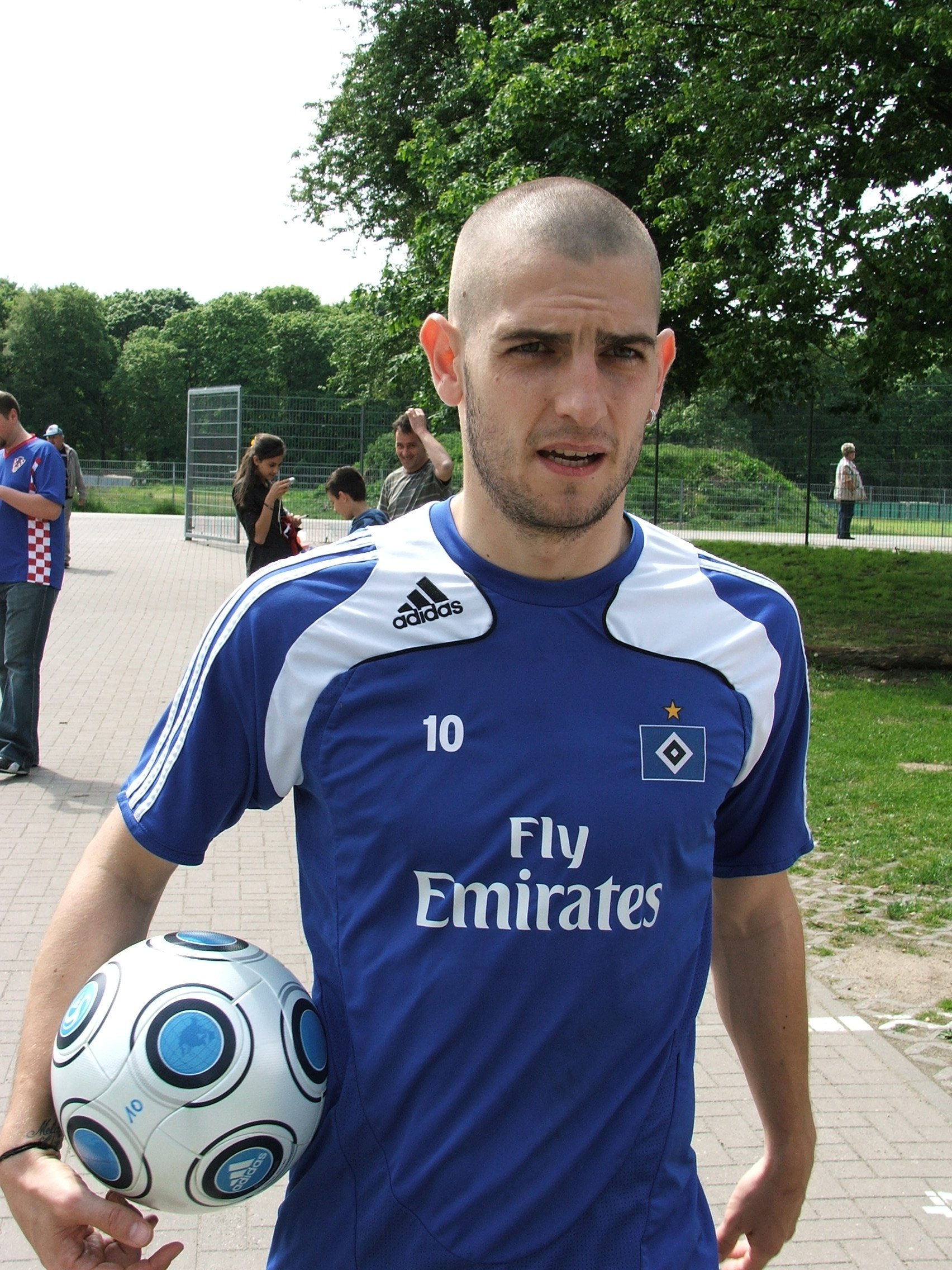
- Petrić at practice with Hamburger SV in 2009

Personal information
- Full name: Mladen Petrić
- Date of birth: 1 January 1981 (age 45)
- Place of birth: Dubrave, SR Bosnia and Herzegovina, Yugoslavia
- Height: 1.85 m (6 ft 1 in)
- Position: Forward

Youth career
- 1986–1996: FC Neuenhof
- 1996–1998: FC Baden

Senior career*
Years	Team	Apps	(Gls)
1998–1999	FC Baden	22	(4)
1999–2004	Grasshoppers	114	(30)
2004–2007	FC Basel	72	(38)
2007–2008	Borussia Dortmund	29	(13)
2008–2012	Hamburger SV	99	(38)
2012–2013	Fulham	23	(5)
2013–2014	West Ham United	3	(0)
2014–2016	Panathinaikos	58	(12)
Total		420	(140)

International career
1998	Switzerland U17	1	(0)
2001	Switzerland U21	1	(0)
2002–2004	Croatia U21	7	(1)
2001–2013	Croatia	45	(13)
- * Club domestic league appearances and goals

Mladen Petrić (Croatian pronunciation: [ˈmladɛn ˈpɛːtrit͡ɕ]; born 1 January 1981) is a retired professional footballer who played as a forward. During his career, he played for Grasshoppers, Basel, Borussia Dortmund, Hamburger SV, Fulham, West Ham United and Panathinaikos. Born in Socialist Bosnia, he represented Switzerland on youth levels internationally before opting for Croatia on senior level.

== Early life ==
Petrić was born in the village of Dubrave near Brčko, SR Bosnia and Herzegovina, Yugoslavia. Petrić moved with his family to Vinkovci and then later to Neuenhof, Switzerland, where he started to play football at the local club FC Neuenhof before moving to FC Baden and starting his professional career at the club in the summer of 1998. He left Baden after one season and went on to sign with Grasshopper Club Zürich in the summer of 1999.

== Club career ==
=== Grasshopper Club ===
Petrić signed for Grasshopper Club ahead of the 1999–2000 Nationalliga A season. At that time GC was the clear number one in Switzerland, and foreign players were often brought in for positions up front. This was particularly pronounced under head coach Roy Hodgson, therefore Petrić had a difficult time. In the next season Hans-Peter Zaugg was appointed as new head coach and Petrić came to regular appearances and in his first five games scored three goals. At the end of the 2000–01 Swiss Football League season Petrić won the championship with GC.

In the 2001–02 season GC were runners-up behind FC Basel and reached the Swiss Cup final. In the final Petrić scored the equaliser, after Basel had taken an early lead. The match went into extra time, but FCB won 2–1 and thus the trophy. At the end of the 2002–03 Nationalliga A season, Petrić won his second championship with GC. But he received much criticism because of an action during the Swiss Championship celebrations, in which he burned a Basel scarf. In the 2003–04 season GC again reached the cup final, this time they were defeated 3–2 by Wil. Petrić left the club in the summer of 2004. During his time playing for GC, he made a total of 114 domestic league appearances and scored 30 league goals for the club.

=== Basel ===
Petrić was acquired for a transfer fee of approximate €3 million and he signed a four-year contract until June 2008. He joined Basel's first team during their 2004–05 season under head coach Christian Gross and Petrić was persuaded to join FCB by him. After playing in seven test games he played his domestic league debut for his new club in the home game in the St. Jakob-Park on 17 July 2004 as Basel won 6–0 against Aarau. He scored his first goal for with the team in the away game in the Stadion Lachen on 22 September. But this goal could not help the team, as Basel were defeated 4–1 by Thun. However Petrić suffered an injury in February 2005 and he then missed the rest of the season. Basel completed all the 2004–05 Super League season's seventeen home games undefeated, winning thirteen and drawing four. They ended the season as Swiss champions with 10 points advantage over second placed Thun. Petrić had 22 appearances, scoring five league goals.

As Swiss champions, Basel entered the 2005–06 Champions League third qualifying round. However, they were drawn against German Bundesliga club Werder Bremen and they lost 4–2 on aggregate. Subsequently, Basel dropped into the 2005–06 UEFA Cup, where against NK Široki Brijeg in the first round, second leg, Petrić scored his first European and the team sealed a 6–0 aggregate win to qualify for the Group stage. Here Basel were then drawn into Group E, alongside Strasbourg, Roma, Red Star Belgrade and Tromsø. Basel qualified for the knock-out stage and in the round of 32 Basel were drawn against AS Monaco, this was won 2–1 on aggregate. In the round of 16, Basel were drawn against Strasbourgh winning 4–2 on aggregate. In the quarter-finals, drawn against Middlesbrough they won the first leg 2–0, but Middlesbrough fought back to win the return match 4–1 and the tie 4–3 on aggregate. Petrić played in 13 of these 14 European games, scoring three goals.

Basel started into the 2005–06 Super League season well and led the championship right until the last day of the league campaign. Petrić scored a hat-trick for the team on 2 October 2005 in the home game in the St. Jakob-Park as Basel won 5–1 against Thun. On the final day of the league season, Basel played at home against Zürich. Petrić had scored an equaliser after FCZ had taken an early lead. A last-minute goal from Zürich's Iulian Filipescu meant the final score was 1–2 in favour of the away team and it gave FCZ their first national championship since 1980–81. The title for Basel was lost on goal difference. Petrić was fourth-leading goal scorer of the Swiss Super League for the 2005–06 season, scoring 14 goals in 31 matches. The last minute loss of the Championship and the subsequent riots, the so-called Basel Hooligan Incident, meant that the club would suffer the consequences.

FC Basel's European campaign started in the first qualifying stage of the 2006–07 UEFA Cup, here they beat Kazakhi side FC Tobol 3–1 on aggregate. In the second qualifying round they were drawn against FC Vaduz from Liechtenstein, narrowly progressing on the away goals rule after a 2–2 aggregate draw. In the first round Basel won 7–2 on aggregate against FK Rabotnički to qualified for the group stage. Here Basel played their first match at home against Feyenoord, this ended in a 1–1 draw. Their second was away and FCB lost 3–0 against Blackburn Rovers. At home against AS Nancy the match was drawn 2–2 and the final game ended with a 3–1 defeat against Wisła Kraków. Basel ended the group stage in last position in the table and were eliminated. Petrić played in all ten of these matches. In the final moments of Basel's match against Nancy on 23 November 2006, Petrić was installed in goal after Basel's goalkeeper Franco Costanzo was sent off for a foul on Nancy's Issiar Dia and the team had already made all three substitutions. The foul resulted in a penalty kick that gave Nancy the final chance for an away victory, but Petrić was able to make a save and stopped the penalty kick taken by Mickaël Chrétien, helping his team to earn a point with a 2–2 draw.

At the end of the 2006–07 Super League season, Basel were runners-up, one point behind championship winners Zürich. Petrić finished the season as the league's top goal scorer with 19 goals and was voted Player of the Year in a fan poll. In the Swiss Cup Basel advanced to the final, beating FC Liestal in the first round, Lugano, FC Baulmes, Aarau and Wil in the semi-final. In the final they played Luzern and won this 1–0 thanks to a penalty goal in the third minute of added time. Petrić played in all six cup games.

Petrić left the club after that season, moving to Germany. During his three seasons with the club he played a total of 141 games for Basel scoring a total of 79 goals. 72 of these games were in the Swiss Super League, 11 in the Swiss Cup, 29 in the UEFA competitions (Champions League and UEFA Cup) and 29 were friendly games. He scored 38 goals in the domestic league, four in the cup, eight in the European games and the other 29 were scored during the test games.

=== Borussia Dortmund ===
On 11 June 2007, Petrić signed for German Bundesliga team Borussia Dortmund, along with fellow Croatia national team player Robert Kovač, as part of the side's squad rebuilding. While originally being intended to act as a playmaker behind the forwards in a 4–4–2 diamond system, it quickly turned out that he was more effective as a striker up front. He enjoyed a strong start to the season, scoring a brace in Dortmund's 3–0 victory against Werder Bremen. He was one of the league's top scorers in his first season in Germany and also made a notable assistance to his side reaching the DFB-Pokal final in which he scored a stoppage time equaliser against eventual winners and champions Bayern Munich.

=== Hamburg ===
On 17 August 2008, Petrić's transfer from Dortmund to Hamburger SV was confirmed by both clubs' official websites as part of a deal that also saw Egyptian international Mohamed Zidan moving in the opposite direction, with both players signing four-year contracts. Dortmund also confirmed they have received an officially undisclosed transfer fee, which was believed to be worth around €5 million.

Petrić made his Bundesliga debut for Hamburg on 23 August 2008 in their 2–1 win at home to Karlsruher SC, coming on as a substitute for Jonathan Pitroipa in the 73rd minute. He scored his first goal for the club on 13 September 2008, netting the winner in their 3–2 win against Bayer Leverkusen. In three consecutive matches in late September and early October 2008, Petrić scored all five goals in Hamburg's 2–0 victories over VfL Bochum in the DFB-Pokal and Unirea Urziceni in the UEFA Cup, as well as their 1–0 victory over Borussia Mönchengladbach in the Bundesliga. On 5 October 2008, he netted a last-minute winner in Hamburg's 2–1 away victory at Energie Cottbus to keep them top of the Bundesliga table. On 28 April 2010, he scored in the Europa League semi-final against Fulham from a free-kick. However crucial the away goal was, Hamburg lost the tie on an aggregate score of 2–1 due to a goalless draw in the first leg in Hamburg. Towards the end of the 2011–12 Bundesliga campaign, it was revealed Petrić would leave Hamburg at the end of the season.

=== Fulham ===
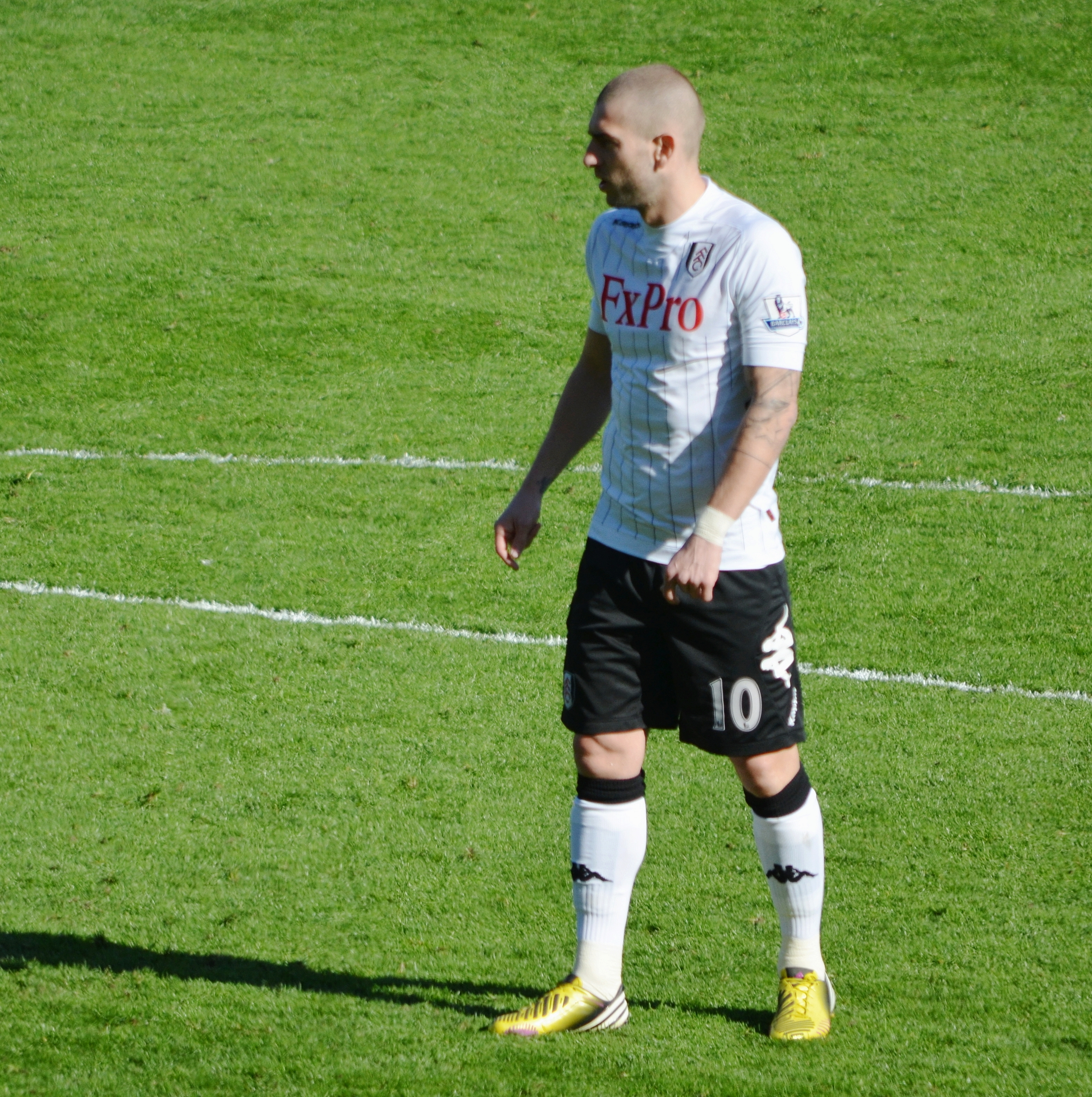
Petrić playing for Fulham in 2013

After being released by Hamburg at the end of the 2011–12 campaign, Petrić signed a one-year deal with English Premier League club Fulham, linking up with former Hamburg boss, Martin Jol. The Croatian striker made his debut at home to Norwich City on the opening day of the Premier League campaign, along with fellow new signing Sascha Riether. Petrić scored a double and provided an assist for Alexander Kačaniklić as Fulham beat Norwich by a score of 5–0.

Petrić was one of twelve players released by Fulham at the end of the 2012–13 Premier League season.

=== West Ham United ===
On 10 September 2013, Petrić joined West Ham United on a one-year deal. He made his debut on 21 September 2013 in a 3–2 home defeat by Everton coming on as a 63rd-minute substitute for Modibo Maïga. He made only three further appearances for the club before being released in December 2013.

=== Panathinaikos ===
On 8 January 2014, Greek club Panathinaikos announced the signing of Petrić on a one-and-a-half-year deal with "The Greens." In Athens, he reunited with his old Hamburg teammate Marcus Berg as well as two of his teammates from the Croatia national team, Danijel Pranjić and Gordon Schildenfeld. On 16 February 2014, Petrić made his debut with the Greek club, coming from the bench against Panthrakikos in Komotini. On 4 May 2014, he scored his first goal for Panathinaikos in a play-off match against PAOK. On 22 February 2015, he scored against rival club Olympiacos in a 2–1 win. On 7 January 2016, he helped his club to escape with a 2–1 away win by scoring the winning goal against PAS Giannina for the Greek Cup. On 28 May 2016, he announced his retirement from professional football. On 12 October 2017, the veteran Croatian international striker has decided to legally demand the €210.000 that Panathinaikos still owe him, almost one and a half years after his official retirement.

== International career ==
In 2001, Petrić was spotted in Switzerland by Mirko Jozić, head coach of the Croatia national team at the time, and made his international debut for Croatia during the team's South Korean tour in November 2001, where they played two friendly matches against the South Korean national team. Petrić appeared in both of the two matches as a second-half substitute, but was subsequently nevertheless not called up to be part of the Croatian squad at the 2002 World Cup finals. He scored his first goal for Croatia in their friendly match against Wales on 21 August 2002 in Varaždin, which ended in a 1–1 draw. He subsequently made his competitive international debut as a second-half substitute in Croatia's opening match of the Euro 2004 qualifying against Estonia, but did not play any international matches at the A-team level for three and half years following this match.

In early 2006, Petrić made his international comeback with Croatia by appearing as a second-half substitute in the team's friendly matches against South Korea at the Carlsberg Cup in Hong Kong and Argentina in Basel. He was eventually omitted from the final 23-man squad for the 2006 World Cup finals, but received a pre-invitation.

In early August 2006, he was called up by Croatia's new coach Slaven Bilić to be part of the team in their friendly match against Italy on 16 August 2006 in Livorno and appeared in the match as a second-half substitute. He was an active member with his national side in their Euro 2008 qualifying campaign, appearing in almost all of the team's qualifying matches. In the second qualifier, against Andorra on 7 October 2006 in Zagreb, he scored four goals in only 60 minutes of playing and became the first ever player to score four goals for Croatia in a competitive match. Croatia won the match 7–0, celebrating their then highest competitive victory ever. In the return leg against Andorra on 12 September 2007, he scored twice.

On 21 November, the last day of Euro 2008 qualifiers, Petrić was brought on as a substitute in the away fixture against England. With Croatia already qualified and the match tied at 2–2, he scored the winning goal from about 25 yards from goal to knock England out of qualifying for Euro 2008. It was England's first competitive defeat at the New Wembley. After the match, he refused to swap his jersey, going on to say, "It's the most valuable goal of my career and the best I've scored. I wouldn't swap my kit with any English player because I want to save it for myself."

Because of his impressive qualifying campaign, he was named in Croatia's Euro 2008 squad. Croatia won their first round group, winning all their matches, including a win against later runners-up Germany, but were knocked out by Turkey in the quarter-finals after a penalty shoot-out.

In 2012, he had not played a match for the national team. In February 2013, he played his last international match and scored a goal against South Korea.

== Career statistics ==
=== Club ===
Appearances and goals by club, season and competition
Club	Season	League			National cup		League cup		Europe		Total	
Club	Season	Division	Apps	Goals	Apps	Goals	Apps	Goals	Apps	Goals	Apps	Goals
FC Baden	1998–99	Nationalliga B	22	4	0	0	–		–		22	4
Grasshoppers	1999–00	Nationalliga A	2	0	0	0	–		0	0	2	0
Grasshoppers	2000–01	Nationalliga A	27	5	0	0	–		–		27	5
Grasshoppers	2001–02	Nationalliga A	27	6	6	2	–		7	3	33	8
Grasshoppers	2002–03	Nationalliga A	30	13	4	2	–		4	0	38	15
Grasshoppers	2003–04	Swiss Super League	28	6	4	2	–		4	0	36	8
Grasshoppers	Total		114	30	14	6	–		15	3	136	36
FC Basel	2004–05	Swiss Super League	16	5	2	0	–		6	0	24	5
FC Basel	2005–06	Swiss Super League	31	14	3	2	–		13	3	47	19
FC Basel	2006–07	Swiss Super League	25	19	6	2	–		10 (Note: Appearances in UEFA Cup)	5	41	26
FC Basel	Total		72	38	11	4	–		29	8	112	50
Borussia Dortmund	2007–08	Bundesliga	29	13	6	5	–		–		35	18
Borussia Dortmund	2008–09	Bundesliga	–		–		1 (Note: Appearance in DFL-Supercup)	0	–		1	0
Borussia Dortmund	Total		29	13	6	5	1	0	–		36	18
Hamburger SV	2008–09	Bundesliga	25	12	4	3	–		12	5	41	20
Hamburger SV	2009–10	Bundesliga	26	8	2	2	–		15 (Note: Appearances in UEFA Europa League)	10	43	20
Hamburger SV	2010–11	Bundesliga	22	11	2	2	–		–		24	13
Hamburger SV	2011–12	Bundesliga	26	7	2	1	–		–		28	8
Hamburger SV	Total		99	38	10	8	–		27	15	136	61
Fulham	2012–13	Premier League	23	5	1	0	0	0	–		24	5
West Ham United	2013–14	Premier League	3	0	0	0	1	0	–		4	0
Panathinaikos	2013–14	Super League Greece	9	1	2	0	–		–		11	1
Panathinaikos	2014–15	Super League Greece	29	7	4	0	–		8	1	41	8
Panathinaikos	2015–16	Super League Greece	20	4	4	1	–		3	0	27	5
Panathinaikos	Total		58	12	10	1	–		11	1	79	14
Career total			410	147	52	24	2	0	82	27	546	198

=== International ===
Appearances and goals by national team and year
National team	Year	Apps	Goals
Croatia	2001	2	0
Croatia	2002	3	1
Croatia	2003	0	0
Croatia	2004	0	0
Croatia	2005	0	0
Croatia	2006	7	4
Croatia	2007	8	4
Croatia	2008	11	1
Croatia	2009	4	1
Croatia	2010	6	1
Croatia	2011	3	0
Croatia	2012	0	0
Croatia	2013	1	1
Total		45	13

Scores and results list Croatia's goal tally first, score column indicates score after each Petrić goal.

List of international goals scored by Mladen Petrić
No.	Date	Venue	Opponent	Score	Result	Competition
1	21 August 2002	Stadion Varteks, Varaždin, Croatia	Wales	1–1	1–1	Friendly
2	7 October 2006	Maksimir, Zagreb, Croatia	Andorra	1–0	7–0	UEFA Euro 2008 qualifying
3	7 October 2006	Maksimir, Zagreb, Croatia	Andorra	2–0	7–0	UEFA Euro 2008 qualifying
4	7 October 2006	Maksimir, Zagreb, Croatia	Andorra	3–0	7–0	UEFA Euro 2008 qualifying
5	7 October 2006	Maksimir, Zagreb, Croatia	Andorra	4–0	7–0	UEFA Euro 2008 qualifying
6	7 February 2007	Kantrida, Rijeka, Croatia	Norway	1–0	2–1	Friendly
7	12 September 2007	Estadi Comunal, Andorra la Vella, Andorra	Andorra	2–0	6–0	UEFA Euro 2008 qualifying
8	12 September 2007	Estadi Comunal, Andorra la Vella, Andorra	Andorra	3–0	6–0	UEFA Euro 2008 qualifying
9	21 November 2007	Wembley Stadium, London, England	England	3–2	3–2	UEFA Euro 2008 qualifying
10	6 September 2008	Maksimir, Zagreb, Croatia	Kazakhstan	3–0	3–0	2010 FIFA World Cup qualification
11	6 June 2009	Maksimir, Zagreb, Croatia	Ukraine	1–0	2–2	2010 FIFA World Cup qualification
12	3 September 2010	Skonto Stadium, Riga, Latvia	Latvia	1–0	3–0	UEFA Euro 2012 qualifying
13	6 February 2013	Craven Cottage, London, England	South Korea	4–0	4–0	Friendly

== Honours ==
Grasshoppers

- Nationalliga A: 2000–01, 2002–03

Basel

- Swiss Super League: 2004–05
- Swiss Cup: 2006–07

Borussia Dortmund

- DFL-Supercup: 2008

Panathinaikos

- Greek Cup: 2013–14

Individual

- Swiss Golden Player Award: 2006
- Swiss Super League Best player 2006–07
- Swiss Super League top scorer: 2006–07

== Sources ==
- Die ersten 125 Jahre. Publisher: Josef Zindel im Friedrich Reinhardt Verlag, Basel. ISBN 978-3-7245-2305-5
- Verein "Basler Fussballarchiv" Homepage
- Interview in ZWÖLF
- Article in bz – Zeitung für die Region Basel
