= Heiko Westermann =

German footballer (born 1983)

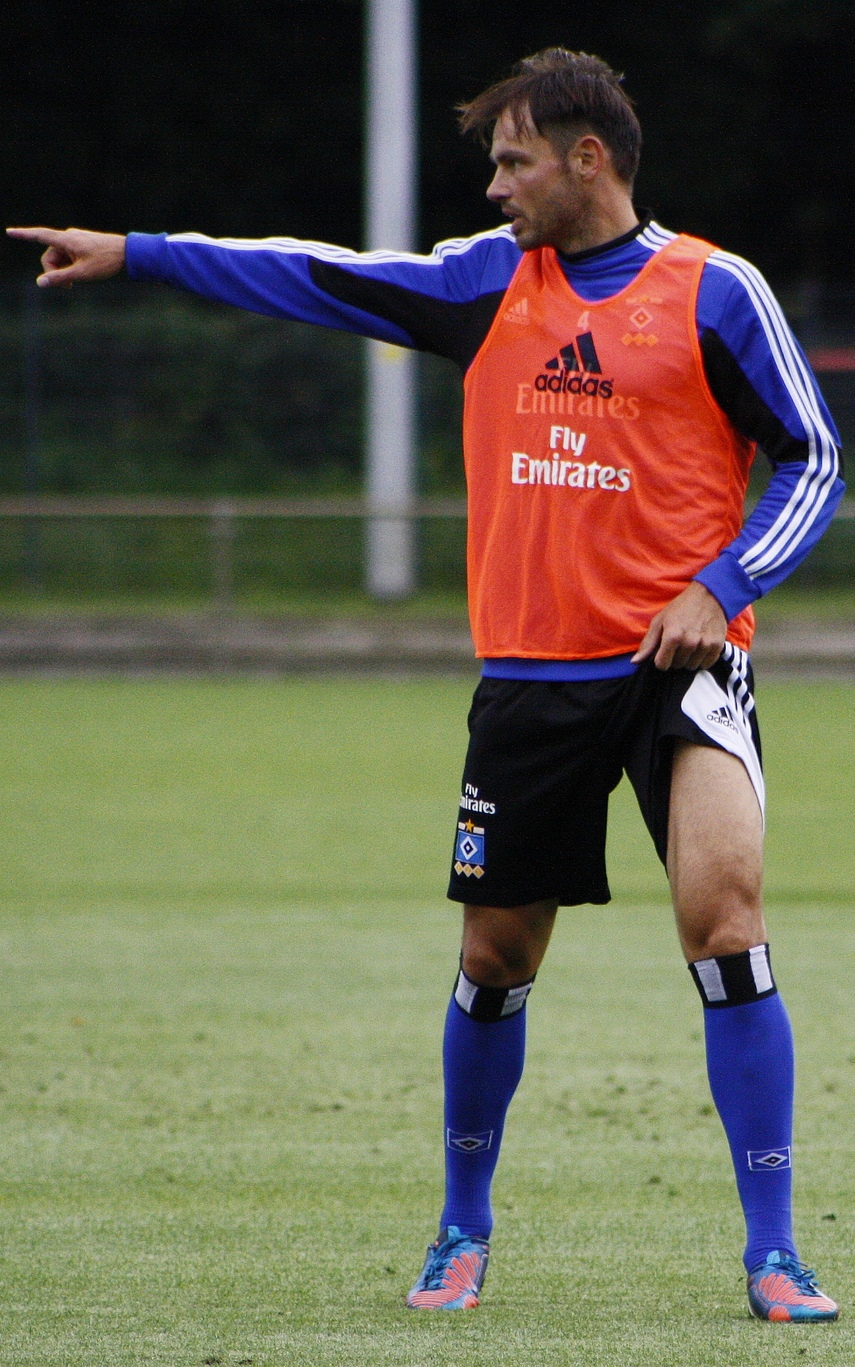
- Westermann at practice with HSV in 2012

Personal information
- Full name: Heiko Westermann
- Date of birth: 14 August 1983 (age 43)
- Place of birth: Alzenau, West Germany
- Height: 1.90 m (6 ft 3 in)
- Position: Centre-back

Team information
- Current team: Barcelona (assistant coach)

Youth career
- 1988–1994: SG Schimborn
- 1994–1998: 1. FC Hösbach
- 1998–2000: FC Bayern Alzenau

Senior career*
Years	Team	Apps	(Gls)
2000–2003	Greuther Fürth II	37	(1)
2002–2005	Greuther Fürth	83	(2)
2005–2007	Arminia Bielefeld	67	(5)
2007–2010	Schalke 04	92	(12)
2010–2015	Hamburger SV	159	(9)
2015–2016	Real Betis	20	(1)
2016–2017	Ajax	4	(0)
2016–2017	Ajax II	4	(0)
2017–2018	Austria Wien	10	(0)
Total		476	(30)

International career
2003–2004	Germany U20	3	(0)
2003–2004	Germany U21	2	(0)
2008–2014	Germany	27	(4)

Managerial career
- 2024–: Barcelona (assistant)
- * Club domestic league appearances and goals

Heiko Westermann (born 14 August 1983) is a German football coach and former player who is the assistant coach of La Liga club Barcelona.

During an 18-year professional career, Westermann played in the Bundesliga for Arminia Bielefeld, Schalke and Hamburg before going abroad to play for clubs in Spain, the Netherlands and Austria. He also represented the Germany national football team at UEFA Euro 2008.

== Club career ==
=== Greuther Fürth ===
Westermann began his professional career with 2. Bundesliga club Greuther Fürth. He joined the senior squad in July 2002 but did not make his first appearance until 26 January 2003 in a 1–0 win over MSV Duisburg. He played a total of 83 league games in his three seasons with the club, scoring two goals.

=== Arminia Bielefeld ===
Following the 2004–05 season, Westermann signed for recently promoted Bundesliga club Arminia Bielefeld. In his first season, he played in every single game for Bielefeld, including 34 league and five DFB-Pokal matches. The following season Westermann remained an integral part of the team, missing only one match.

=== Schalke 04 ===
Westermann moved to Schalke 04 in 2007 for a fee of €2.8 million. He played his first game for Schalke on 24 July in a Ligapokal fixture against 1. FC Nürnberg. Schalke won 4–2 with Westermann contributing one goal. Missing Schalke's first two league games through injury, Westermann made his Bundesliga debut for the club on 26 August 2007. He was substituted on in the 79th minute for Rafinha in a third round match against VfL Wolfsburg. For the remainder of the season, Westermann started all 31 of Schalke's Bundesliga matches. He was also instrumental in Schalke's Champions League campaign, being the only outfield player for the club to play every single minute.

With new coach Fred Rutten taking charge of Schalke for the 2008–09 season, combined with his keen eye for goal, Westermann has often been positioned in midfield. The current season has been Westermann's highest scoring yet. He scored both goals in a 2–0 DFB-Pokal win over Hannover 96. He also scored a goal in three consecutive Bundesliga matches including the equalizing goal in a 1–1 draw against Werder Bremen and a game-winning goal against VfL Bochum.

=== Hamburger SV ===
In July 2010, Westermann agreed to a transfer to Hamburger SV, reportedly in the region of €7.5 million. Despite being a new signing, he was named new captain by then HSV coach Armin Veh. On 9 April 2013, following a run of bad results, including a 9–2 drubbing by Bayern Munich, Rafael van der Vaart was announced as Westermann's successor as the club's captain, in a bid to relieve him of mounting pressure. On 25 June 2015, Hamburg confirmed Westermann's contract would not be renewed for the 2015–16 campaign.

=== Betis ===
On 6 August 2015 Westermann signed a two-year deal with Real Betis, newly promoted to La Liga. He received his first ever career red card on 28 November 2015 after his second bookable offence against Levante.

=== Ajax ===
On 14 July 2016, it was announced that Westermann had signed a two-year deal with Eredivisie side Ajax. However, he was used sparingly, so he worked as a youth coach during his time there.

=== Austria Wien ===
Shortly after his contract with Ajax had been dissolved, Westermann signed a two-year deal with Austrian side Austria Wien.

He announced his departure from the club along with the end of his active player career in April 2018.

== International career ==
On 31 January 2008, Westermann was first called up by Germany's manager Joachim Löw for the friendly on 6 February 2008 at Vienna's Ernst-Happel-Stadion against Austria. Germany won the match 3–0 and Westermann was in the starting eleven and played 90 minutes. Westermann was part of the German team that finished in second place at Euro 2008. On 2 June 2009, Westermann scored the first international goal in Germany's 7–2 rout against United Arab Emirates national football team. He was part of Germany's preliminary selection for the World Cup 2010, but had to pull out because of an injury suffered in a friendly against Hungary. He has been capped 27 times by Germany and has scored four goals for them since 2008.

== Personal life ==
Westermann's wife is named Irina, they married in June 2007. In May 2008, the couple had their first daughter, Lana. In October 2010, Nikita, their second daughter was born.

== Career statistics ==
=== Club ===
Appearances and goals by club, season and competition
Club	Season	League			Cup (Note: Includes DFB-Pokal, Copa del Rey, KNVB Cup, and Austrian Cup.)		Continental (Note: Includes UEFA Champions League and UEFA Europa League.)		Other (Note: Includes DFL-Ligapokal and Relegation playoff.)		Total	
Club	Season	Division	Apps	Goals	Apps	Goals	Apps	Goals	Apps	Goals	Apps	Goals
Greuther Fürth	2002–03	2. Bundesliga	16	0	0	0	—		—		16	0
Greuther Fürth	2003–04	2. Bundesliga	34	0	4	1	—		—		38	1
Greuther Fürth	2005–06	2. Bundesliga	33	2	2	1	—		—		35	3
Greuther Fürth	Total		83	2	6	2	0	0	0	0	89	4
Arminia Bielefeld	2005–06	Bundesliga	34	2	5	0	—		—		39	2
Arminia Bielefeld	2006–07	Bundesliga	33	3	1	0	—		—		34	5
Arminia Bielefeld	Total		67	5	6	0	0	0	0	0	73	5
Schalke 04	2007–08	Bundesliga	32	4	3	1	10	0	2	1	47	6
Schalke 04	2008–09	Bundesliga	33	6	4	2	8	1	—		45	9
Schalke 04	2009–10	Bundesliga	27	2	4	1	—		—		31	3
Schalke 04	Total		92	12	11	4	18	1	2	1	123	18
Hamburger SV	2010–11	Bundesliga	34	2	2	0	—		—		36	2
Hamburger SV	2011–12	Bundesliga	33	1	3	1	—		—		36	2
Hamburger SV	2012–13	Bundesliga	34	3	1	0	—		—		35	3
Hamburger SV	2013–14	Bundesliga	30	3	3	0	2	0	—		35	3
Hamburger SV	2014–15	Bundesliga	28	0	2	1	1	0	—		31	1
Hamburger SV	Total		159	9	11	2	0	0	3	0	173	11
Real Betis	2015–16	La Liga	20	1	0	0	—		—		20	1
Ajax	2016–17	Eredivisie	4	0	1	0	3	0	—		8	0
Jong Ajax	2016–17	Eerste Divisie	4	0	—		—		—		4	0
Austria Wien	2017–18	Austrian Bundesliga	10	0	2	0	7	0	—		19	0
Career total			439	29	37	8	28	1	5	1	509	39

=== International ===
Scores and results list Germany's goal tally first, score column indicates score after each Westermann goal.

List of international goals scored by Heiko Westermann
No.	Date	Venue	Opponent	Score	Result	Competition
1	6 September 2008	Rheinpark Stadion, Vaduz, Liechtenstein	Liechtenstein	6–0	6–0	2010 FIFA World Cup qualification
2	2 June 2009	Zayed Sports City Stadium, Abu Dhabi, United Arab Emirates	United Arab Emirates	1–0	7–2	Friendly
3	7 September 2010	RheinEnergieStadion, Cologne, Germany	Azerbaijan	1–0	6–1	UEFA Euro 2012 qualifying
4	2 June 2013	RFK Stadium, Washington, United States	United States	1–2	3–4	Friendly

== Honours ==
Ajax

- UEFA Europa League runner-up: 2017

Germany

- UEFA European Championship runner-up: 2008
