= Jaroslav Drobný (footballer) =

Czech footballer (born 1979)

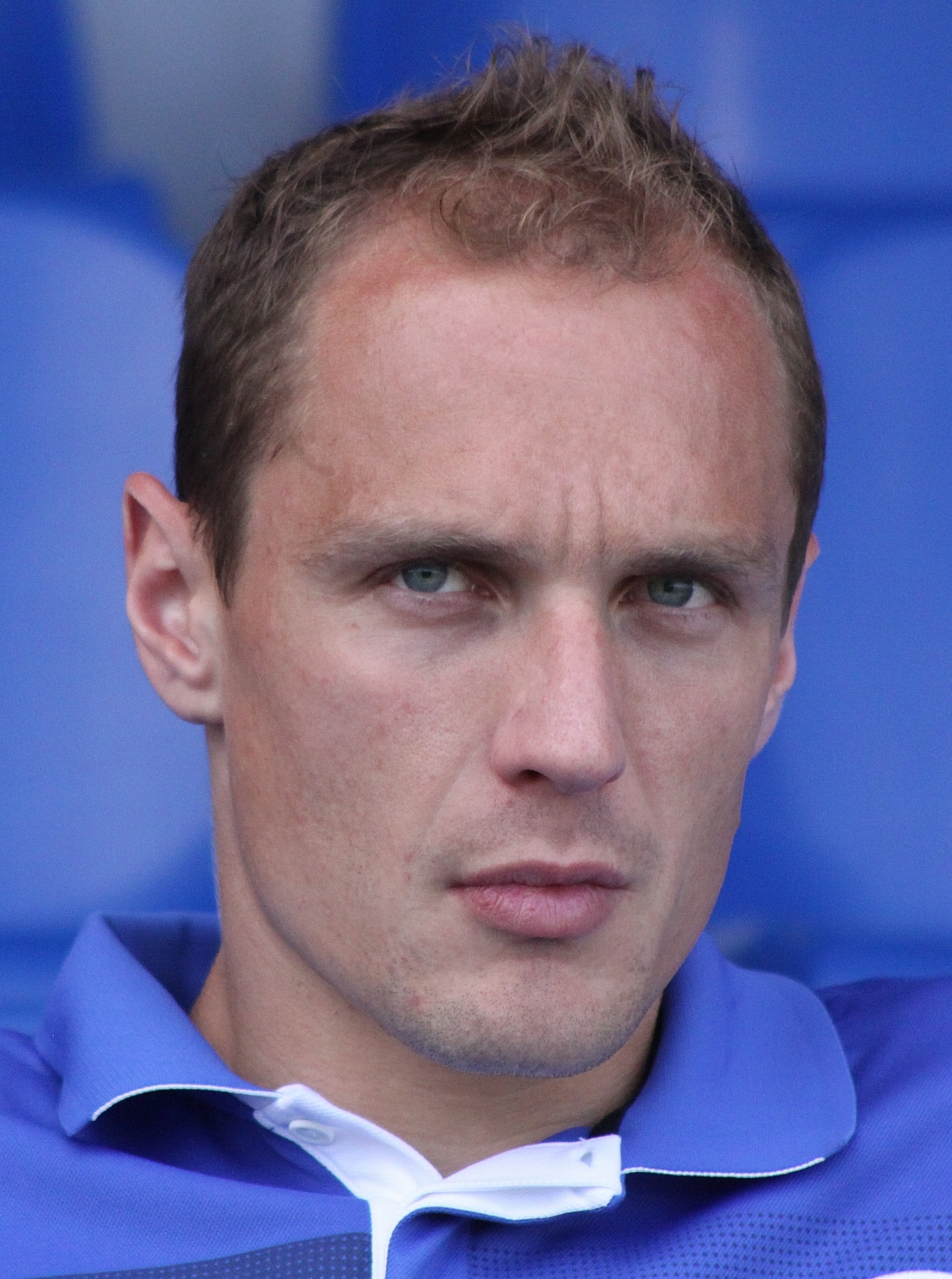
- Drobný with Hertha BSC in 2009

Personal information
- Date of birth: 18 October 1979 (age 47)
- Place of birth: Počátky, Czechoslovakia
- Height: 1.92 m (6 ft 4 in)
- Position: Goalkeeper

Team information
- Current team: Bayern Munich II (goalkeeping coach)

Youth career
- SK Chrudim
- –1999: Vítkovice

Senior career*
Years	Team	Apps	(Gls)
1999–2001	České Budějovice	46	(0)
2001–2005	Panionios	101	(0)
2005–2006	Fulham	0	(0)
2006	→ ADO Den Haag (loan)	12	(0)
2006	Ipswich Town	0	(0)
2007	VfL Bochum	17	(0)
2007–2010	Hertha BSC	97	(0)
2010–2016	Hamburger SV	76	(0)
2016–2019	Werder Bremen	10	(0)
2019	Fortuna Düsseldorf	2	(0)
2019–2021	Dynamo České Budějovice	40	(0)
Total		401	(0)

International career
1997–1998	Czech Republic U18	6	(0)
1997	Czech Republic U20	1	(0)
1999–2002	Czech Republic U21	16	(0)
2009–2013	Czech Republic	7	(0)

Managerial career
- 2021–: Bayern Munich II (goalkeeping coach)
Medal record
Men's football
Representing Czech Republic
UEFA European Under-21 Championship
Winner	2002 Switzerland
- * Club domestic league appearances and goals

Jaroslav Drobný (Czech pronunciation: [ˈjaroslav ˈdrobniː]; born 18 October 1979) is a Czech former professional footballer who played as a goalkeeper. He currently works as the goalkeeping coach for German club Bayern Munich II.

Drobný previously played for Panionios, ADO Den Haag, VfL Bochum, Ipswich Town, Hertha BSC, Hamburger SV, Werder Bremen, and Fortuna Düsseldorf. At international level, he represented the Czech Republic.

== Club career ==
Drobný's first club was local club SK Chrudim. In his first season, he signed a contract with Chrudium's rivals FC Vítkovice. He joined First Division club České Budějovice in 1999 where he spent his first two professional seasons.

In 2001, he was transferred to Panionios in the Alpha Ethniki, the first tier in Greece.

In 2005, Drobný was spotted by Fulham, and in the summer, the club having sold Edwin van der Sar, he was bought by the West London club. However, he was injured shortly after his arrival, and upon returning to fitness failed to get into the team. He was loaned for half a season to the Dutch club ADO Den Haag. When he returned his contract was terminated by mutual consent in August 2006, without Drobný having played a first-team game for the club.

On 27 October 2006, he joined Ipswich Town on a short-term deal, but failed to make a first-team appearance.

In January 2007, following a trial, Drobný joined Bundesliga side VfL Bochum on a contract until the end of the season. He immediately took over the position in goal from Danish keeper Peter Skov-Jensen. On 27 January 2007, he made his league debut with VfL Bochum against Mainz 05.

Drobný moved to Hertha BSC for the 2007–08 season. After a strong 2008–09 season, in which Hertha led the Bundesliga for five matchdays, Hertha finished in last place in the 2009–10 season, and he left the club to join Hamburger SV.

In June 2016, Drobný joined Werder Bremen on a year-long contract. In the 2016–17 season, he made 10 league appearances. During the season he was kept out of action by injuries to his hand and his shoulder as well as by a three-match suspension from a red card received on matchday 17. In June 2017, he agreed to extend his contract at the club. A further year-long contract extension followed in July 2018.

In January 2019, moved to Werder Bremen's league rivals Fortuna Düsseldorf.

In October 2019, Drobný returned to the Czech Republic joining former club Dynamo České Budějovice. In May 2021 Drobný confirmed the end of his career at Dynamo České Budějovice.

== International career ==
Drobný was part of the Czech side which won the UEFA U-21 Championship in 2002. Drobný has played 16 times for the Czech national under-21 side, but his opportunities have been limited in the full squad. On 11 February 2009, Drobný made his debut for the senior team in a 0–0 draw against Morocco.

== Coaching career ==
In October 2021 Drobný was appointed interim goalkeeping coach at Bayern Munich II after Walter Junghans underwent knee surgery.

== Career statistics ==
=== Club ===
Appearances and goals by club, season and competition
Club	Season	League			Cup		Europe		Other		Total	
Club	Season	League	Apps	Goals	Apps	Goals	Apps	Goals	Apps	Goals	Apps	Goals
České Budějovice	1999–2000	Czech First League	28	0	0	0	—		—		28	0
České Budějovice	2000–01	Czech First League	18	0	1	0	—		—		19	0
České Budějovice	Totals		46	0	1	0	—		—		47	0
Panionios	2001–02	Alpha Ethniki	21	0	6	0	—		—		27	0
Panionios	2002–03	Alpha Ethniki	30	0	8	0	—		—		38	0
Panionios	2003–04	Alpha Ethniki	28	0	6	0	4	0	—		38	0
Panionios	2004–05	Alpha Ethniki	22	0	6	0	4	0	—		32	0
Panionios	Totals		101	0	26	0	8	0	—		135	0
Fulham	2005–06	Premier League	0	0	0	0	—		—		0	0
ADO Den Haag (loan)	2005–06	Eredivisie	12	0	—		—		—		0	0
Ipswich Town	2006–07	Championship	0	0	—		—		—		0	0
VfL Bochum	2006–07	Bundesliga	17	0	—		—		—		17	0
Hertha BSC	2007–08	Bundesliga	34	0	2	0	—		—		36	0
Hertha BSC	2008–09	Bundesliga	33	0	2	0	10	0	—		45	0
Hertha BSC	2009–10	Bundesliga	30	0	1	0	8	0	—		39	0
Hertha BSC	Totals		97	0	5	0	18	0	—		120	0
Hamburger SV	2010–11	Bundesliga	5	0	1	0	—		—		6	0
Hamburger SV	2011–12	Bundesliga	32	0	3	0	—		—		35	0
Hamburger SV	2012–13	Bundesliga	2	0	0	0	—		—		2	0
Hamburger SV	2013–14	Bundesliga	4	0	1	0	—		2	0	7	0
Hamburger SV	2014–15	Bundesliga	23	0	1	0	—		0	0	24	0
Hamburger SV	2015–16	Bundesliga	10	0	0	0	—		—		10	0
Hamburger SV	Totals		76	0	6	0	—		2	0	84	0
Werder Bremen	2016–17	Bundesliga	10	0	0	0	—		—		10	0
Werder Bremen	2017–18	Bundesliga	0	0	0	0	—		—		0	0
Werder Bremen	Totals		14	0	3	0	—		—		17	0
Fortuna Düsseldorf	2018–19	Bundesliga	2	0	1	0	—		—		3	0
Dynamo České Budějovice	2019–20	Czech First League	18	0	0	0	—		0	0	18	0
Dynamo České Budějovice	2020–21	Czech First League	22	0	1	0	—		—		23	0
Dynamo České Budějovice	Totals		40	0	1	0	—		0	0	41	0
Career totals			401	0	43	0	26	0	2	0	472	0

=== International ===
Appearances and goals by national team and year
National team	Year	Apps	Goals
Czech Republic	2008	0	0
Czech Republic	2009	2	0
Czech Republic	2010	2	0
Czech Republic	2011	1	0
Czech Republic	2012	1	0
Czech Republic	2013	1	0
Czech Republic	2016	0	0
Czech Republic	2017	0	0
Total		7	0
