= Änis Ben-Hatira =

Tunisian footballer

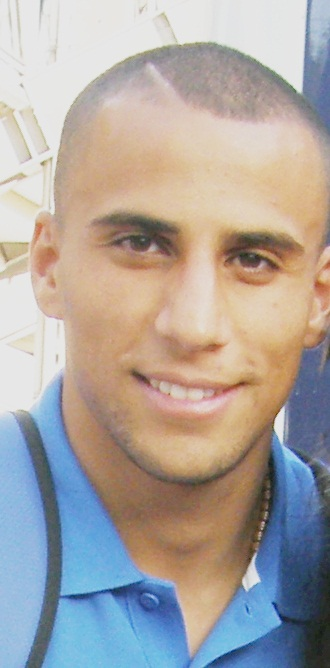
- Ben-Hatira in 2013

Personal information
- Date of birth: 18 July 1988 (age 38)
- Place of birth: West Berlin, West Germany
- Height: 1.81 m (5 ft 11 in)
- Position: Attacking midfielder

Team information
- Current team: Hertha BSC II
- Number: 10

Youth career
- 1994–1995: Reinickendorfer Füchse
- 1995–2003: Hertha BSC
- 2003–2006: Tennis Borussia Berlin

Senior career*
Years	Team	Apps	(Gls)
2006–2011	Hamburger SV II	51	(16)
2007–2011	Hamburger SV	29	(3)
2009	→ MSV Duisburg (loan)	13	(2)
2009–2010	→ MSV Duisburg (loan)	16	(1)
2011–2016	Hertha BSC	70	(14)
2011–2016	Hertha BSC II	5	(2)
2016	Eintracht Frankfurt	9	(1)
2016–2017	Darmstadt 98	11	(1)
2017	Gaziantepspor	14	(2)
2017–2018	Espérance Tunis	8	(1)
2019–2020	Budapest Honvéd	20	(4)
2020	Karlsruher SC	11	(1)
2021	AEL	11	(0)
2022	Berliner AK 07	10	(2)
2022–2023	US Monastir	4	(0)
2023–	Hertha BSC II	76	(14)

International career^{‡}
2007–2008	Germany U19	8	(4)
2007–2008	Germany U20	6	(0)
2009–2010	Germany U21	9	(1)
2012–2016	Tunisia	12	(1)
Medal record
Men's football
Representing Germany
UEFA European Under-21 Championship
Winner	2009 Sweden
- * Club domestic league appearances and goals as of 23 September 2026 ‡ National team caps and goals as of 08:00, 4 February 2017 (UTC)

Änis Ben-Hatira (born 18 July 1988) is a Tunisian professional footballer who plays as an attacking midfielder for German Regionalliga club Hertha BSC II. Between 2012 and 2016 he made 12 appearances for the Tunisia national team scoring one goal.

== Club career ==
Born in Berlin, Ben-Hatira started his football career playing for local club Reinickendorfer Füchse before moving to TeBe Berlin, where he spent most of his youth. Following a spell at Hertha BSC, he was signed by Hamburger SV.

Ben-Hatira made his Bundesliga debut on 24 February 2007 against Eintracht Frankfurt, coming on as a substitute for Mehdi Mahdavikia. He made his first Bundesliga start against Wolfsburg on 1 April 2007. Hamburg extended his contract until 2012. On 1 February 2009, he joined MSV Duisburg on a loan until 30 June 2009 and was subsequently loaned out to MSV Duisburg for another season.

In July 2010, Ben-Hatira joined West Ham United on trial, making his debut on 28 July when he played for 64 minutes in a 2–0 win against MK Dons. However, he did not sign for West Ham and remained in Hamburg for the following season. On the final day of the 2011 summer transfer window, Ben-Hatira returned to Hertha BSC. He moved to Eintracht Frankfurt on 1 February 2016.

Ben-Hatira signed for SV Darmstadt 98 on 22 August 2016. He was released on 25 January 2017 by mutual agreement and due to alleged connections he has with Düsseldorf based organization Ansaar International, which has been described by the German state of North Rhine-Westphalia's internal intelligence agency as being "tightly interwoven in the Salafist movement".

On 1 February 2017, Ben-Hatira joined Süper Lig side Gaziantepspor on a contract until June, with the option of a further year.

After dissolving his contract with Gaziantepspor in July 2017, he joined Tunisian club Espérance Tunis in September 2017.

He joined Hungarian side Budapest Honvéd FC in February 2019 where he scored his first goal on 23 February 2019 against MTK Budapest FC.

On 31 January 2020, Ben-Hatira joined Karlsruher SC on a deal until the end of the 2019–20 season.

He played in Greece for AEL until May 2021. He later played for Berliner AK 07 in 2022, Tunisian side US Monastir in 2022–23, then returned to Berlin to join Hertha BSC II in 2023.

== International career ==
After playing for several German international youth sides, Ben-Hatira was first called up for the Tunisia national team on 21 February 2012. Eight days later, he made his debut for Tunisia in a friendly match against Peru.

He scored his first goal against Guinea in 2018 FIFA World Cup qualification on 9 October 2016 in the 79th minute.

== Career statistics ==
=== Club ===
As of match played on 3 April 2021

Appearances and goals by club, season and competition
Club	Season	League			Cup		Other		Total	
Club	Season	Division	Apps	Goals	Apps	Goals	Apps	Goals	Apps	Goals
Hamburger SV II	2005–06	Regionalliga Nord	14	2	—		—		14	2
Hamburger SV II	2006–07	Regionalliga Nord	11	5	—		—		11	5
Hamburger SV II	2007–08	Regionalliga Nord	13	2	—		—		13	2
Hamburger SV II	2008–09	Regionalliga Nord	1	0	—		—		1	0
Hamburger SV II	2010–11	Regionalliga Nord	12	7	—		—		12	7
Hamburger SV II	Total		51	16	—		—		51	16
Hamburger SV	2006–07	Bundesliga	5	0	0	0	0	0	5	0
Hamburger SV	2007–08	Bundesliga	3	0	0	0	0	0	3	0
Hamburger SV	2008–09	Bundesliga	2	0	0	0	1 (Note: Appearance in the 2008–09 UEFA Cup)	0	3	0
Hamburger SV	2009–10	Bundesliga	0	0	0	0	1 (Note: One appearance in 2009–10 UEFA Europa League)	0	1	0
Hamburger SV	2010–11	Bundesliga	18	3	0	0	—		18	3
Hamburger SV	2011–12	Bundesliga	1	0	0	0	—		1	0
Hamburger SV	Total		29	3	0	0	2	0	31	3
MSV Duisburg (loan)	2008–09	2. Bundesliga	13	2	0	0	—		13	2
MSV Duisburg (loan)	2009–10	2. Bundesliga	16	1	2	0	—		18	1
MSV Duisburg (loan)	Total		29	3	2	0	—		31	3
Hertha BSC	2011–12	Bundesliga	16	3	2	0	2 (Note: Two appearances in 2011–12 Bundesliga play-offs)	1	20	4
Hertha BSC	2012–13	2. Bundesliga	18	4	1	2	—		19	6
Hertha BSC	2013–14	Bundesliga	21	3	1	0	—		22	3
Hertha BSC	2014–15	Bundesliga	15	4	1	0	—		16	4
Hertha BSC	2015–16	Bundesliga	0	0	0	0	—		0	0
Hertha BSC	Total		70	14	5	2	2	1	77	17
Hertha BSC II	2011–12	Regionalliga Nord	2	0	—		—		2	0
Hertha BSC II	2015–16	Regionalliga Nordost	3	2	—		—		3	2
Hertha BSC II	Total		5	2	—		—		5	2
Eintracht Frankfurt	2015–16	Bundesliga	9	1	0	0	2 (Note: Two appearances in 2015–16 Bundesliga play-offs)	0	11	1
Darmstadt 98	2016–17	Bundesliga	11	1	0	0	—		11	1
Gaziantepspor	2016–17	Süper Lig	14	2	0	0	—		14	2
Espérance Tunis	2017–18	Tunisian Ligue 1	8	1	0	0	—		8	1
Budapest Honvéd	2018–19	NB I	12	3	1	0	—		13	3
Budapest Honvéd	2019–20	NB 1	8	1	0	0	—		8	1
Budapest Honvéd	Total		20	4	1	0	—		21	4
Karlsruher SC	2019–20	2. Bundesliga	11	1	0	0	—		11	1
AE Larissa	2020–21	Super League Greece	8	0	1	0	—		9	0
Career total			265	48	7	2	6	1	278	51

=== International ===
Appearances and goals by national team and year
National team	Year	Apps	Goals
Tunisia	2012	6	0
Tunisia	2013	2	0
Tunisia	2014	0	0
Tunisia	2015	2	0
Tunisia	2016	2	1
Total		12	1

Scores and results list Tunisia's goal tally first, score column indicates score after each Ben-Hatira goal.

List of international goals scored by Änis Ben-Hatira
No.	Date	Venue	Opponent	Score	Result	Competition
1	9 October 2016	Stade Mustapha Ben Jannet, Monastir, Tunisia	Guinea	2–0	2–0	2018 FIFA World Cup qualification

== Honours ==
Hertha BSC

- 2. Bundesliga: 2012–13

Germany U21

- UEFA European Under-21 Championship: 2009
