= Dennis Aogo =

German association football player (born 1987)

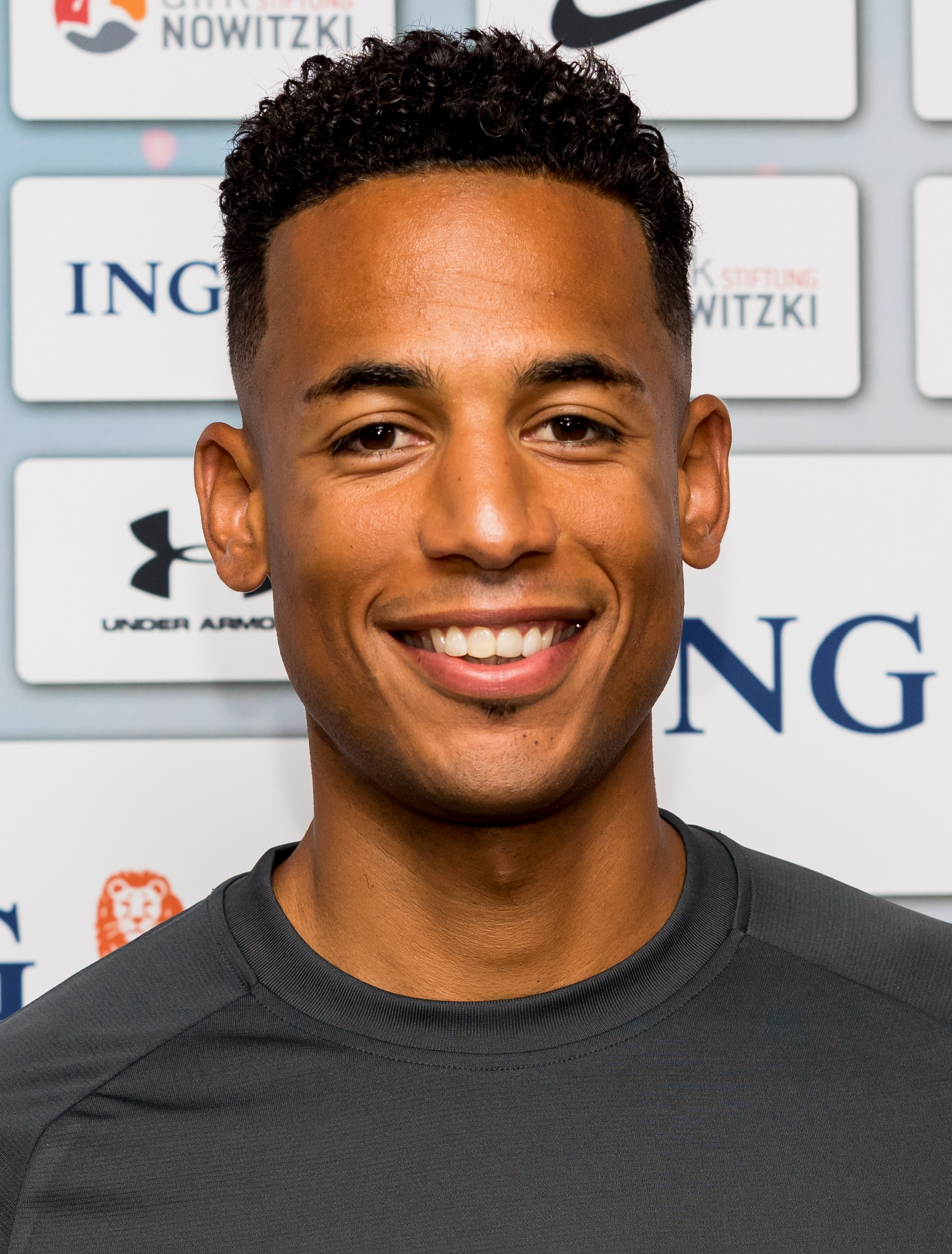
- Aogo in 2019

Personal information
- Full name: Dennis Aogo
- Date of birth: 14 January 1987 (age 39)
- Place of birth: Karlsruhe, West Germany
- Height: 1.84 m (6 ft 0 in)
- Positions: Left-back; midfielder

Youth career
- 1991–1993: FV Grünwinkel
- 1993–1994: Bulacher SC
- 1994–2000: Karlsruher SC
- 2000–2002: Waldhof Mannheim
- 2002–2004: SC Freiburg

Senior career*
| Years | Team | Apps | (Gls) |
| 2004–2008 | SC Freiburg | 94 | (11) |
| 2008–2013 | Hamburger SV | 133 | (2) |
| 2013–2017 | Schalke 04 | 65 | (0) |
| 2017–2019 | VfB Stuttgart | 44 | (0) |
| 2019–2020 | Hannover 96 | 4 | (0) |
| Total | | 340 | (13) |

International career
| 2002–2003 | Germany U16 | 14 | (2) |
| 2007–2009 | Germany U21 | 25 | (4) |
| 2010–2013 | Germany | 12 | (0) |
Medal record
Representing Germany
| Winner | UEFA U-21 Championship | 2009 |
| Third place | FIFA World Cup | 2010 |
- * Club domestic league appearances and goals

Dennis Aogo (born 14 January 1987) is a German former professional footballer who played as a left-back and midfielder. During his professional career, he played for SC Freiburg, Hamburger SV, Schalke 04, VfB Stuttgart and Hannover 96 and represented the German national team between 2010 and 2013.

== Early life ==
Born to a German mother and a Nigerian father, Aogo grew up in Oberreut, a suburb in the south-west of Karlsruhe, Baden-Württemberg. In 2000, when his parents split up, he moved with his father to Bruchsal and left Karlsruher SC to join Waldhof Mannheim. In 2002, aged 15, he joined SC Freiburg and attended their youth academy while graduating with Mittlere Reife at Max-Weber-Schule in Freiburg.

== Club career ==
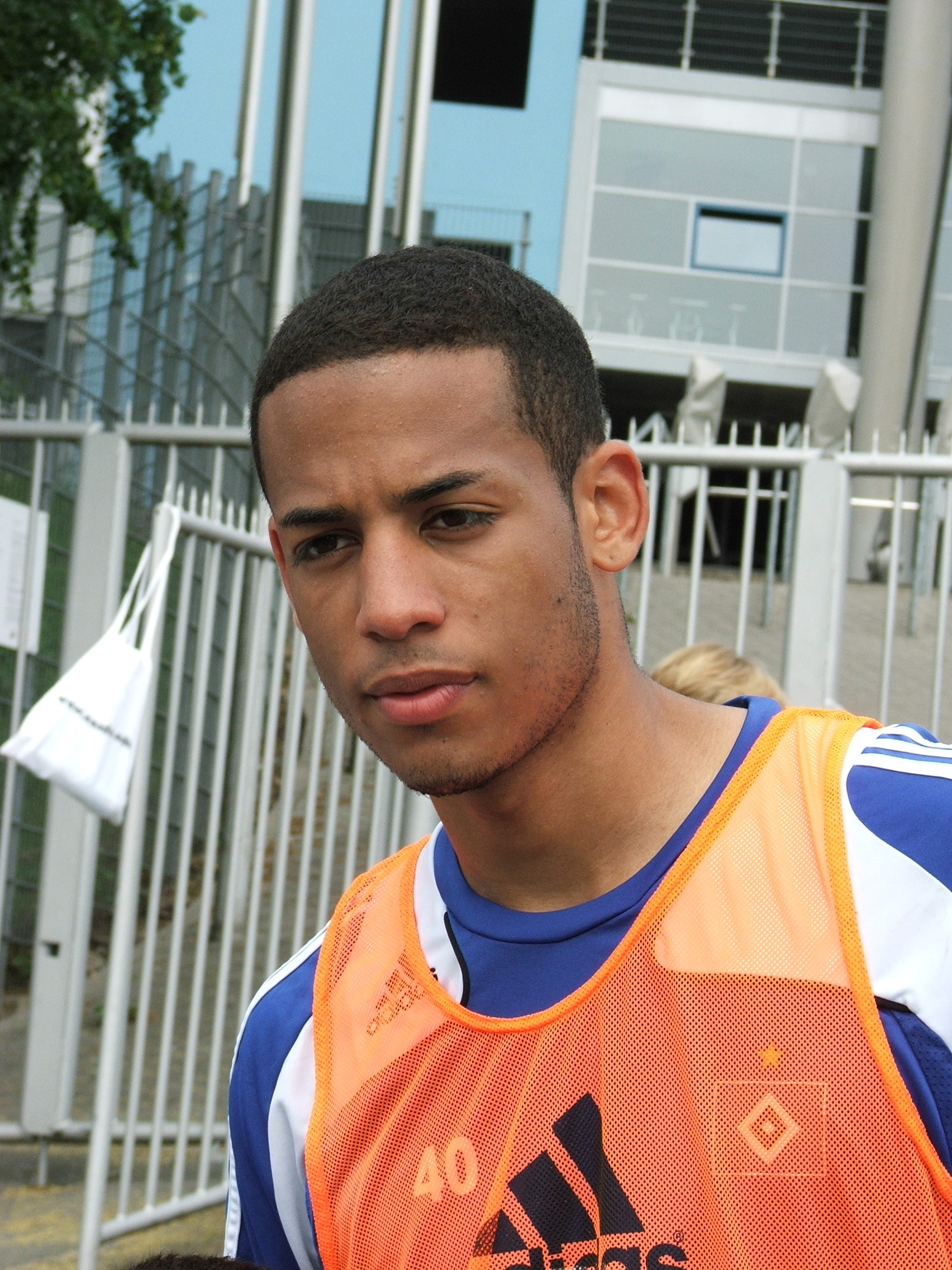
Aogo with Hamburger SV in 2009

Aogo played with the Karlsruher SC academy and has played at several youth levels including the U15s and U16s. Since 2004, he was a part of the SC Freiburg academy, and celebrated his debut in the Bundesliga at seventeen years of age and he immediately won himself a place in the centre of midfield.

Aogo joined signed at Bundesliga club Hamburger SV in 2008 and was part of the regular starting lineup, mostly as a left back. On 29 August 2013, Aogo was loaned to Schalke 04. S04 then agreed transfer fee terms in June 2014 for a permanent €2,000,000 move, and Aogo signed a contract with Schalke 04 running until 30 June 2017.

On 9 August 2017, Aogo moved to VfB Stuttgart.

On 3 September 2019, Hannover 96 announced the signing of Aogo on a free transfer. In January 2020, he agreed the termination of his contract with the club.

Aogo announced his retirement from playing in August 2020. He amassed 340 appearances in the two top divisions of German pro football.

== International career ==
Aogo was a member of the German U21 squad. Due to FIFA regulations at the time he was prevented from representing the Nigeria national team having earlier represented Germany at youth and at age group levels. But in 2004, FIFA removed the age limit for switching of nationalities, meaning that Aogo could have represented Nigeria. However, after turning down several invitations by the Nigerian Football Association he declared his desire to continue representing Germany as he saw a good chance to earn a place in the German senior squad in the future.

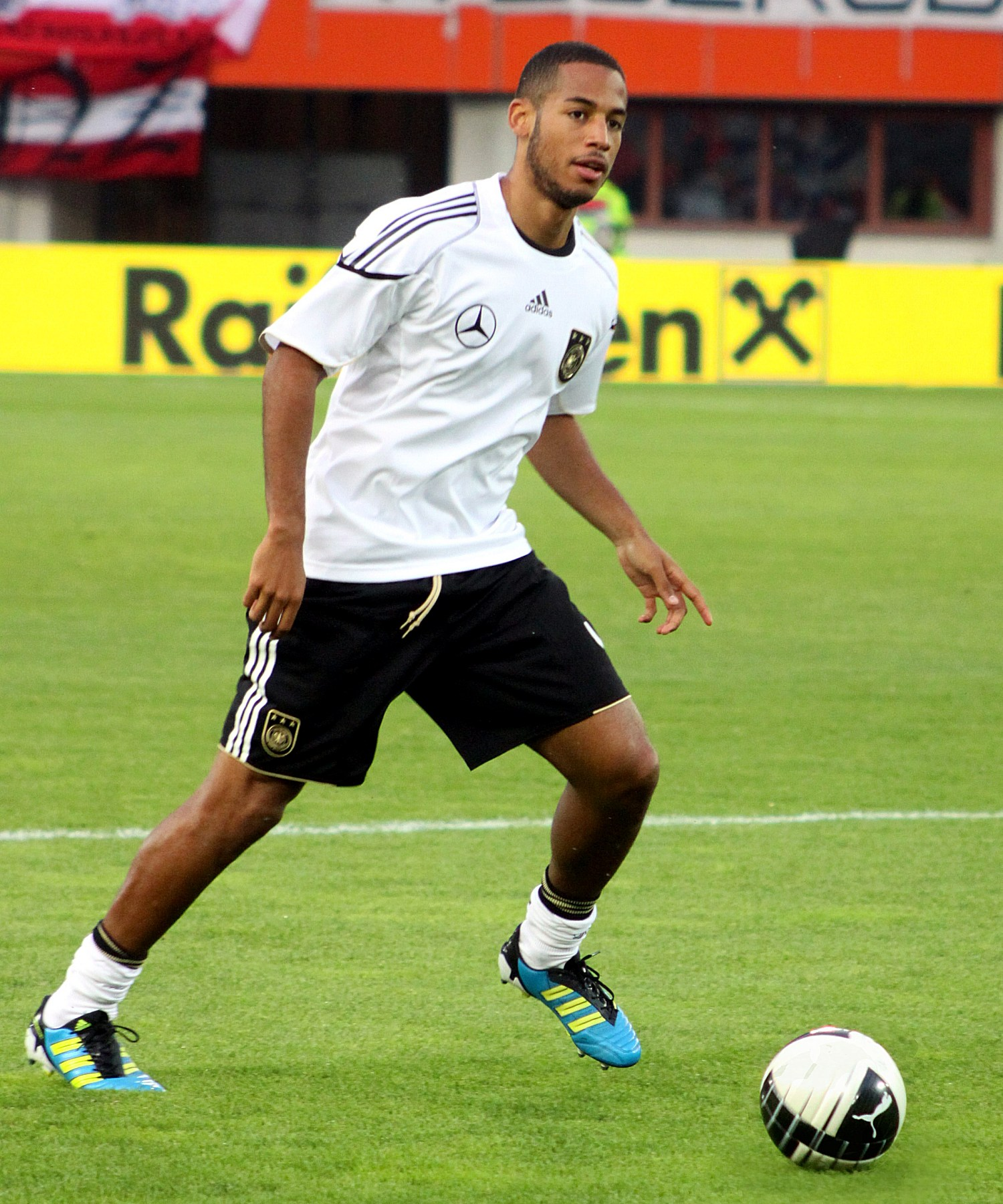
Aogo with the Germany national team

Nigeria, the homeland of Aogo's father, wanted to call him up for the 2010 FIFA World Cup in South Africa as Shaibu Amodu watched him for a considerable time but Aogo announced on 5 January 2010 that he would only play for the Germany national team. He made his debut for Germany in their first preparation game against Malta in a 3–0 victory on 13 May 2010, playing 79 minutes, before being replaced by fellow full-back and then Hamburg club mate Jérôme Boateng. Aogo was included in Germany's 2010 FIFA World Cup squad. He won his last cap in early June 2013.

== Style of play ==
Germany national youth coach Horst Hrubesch said about Aogo that he had "a very good left foot, is clever with or without the ball at his feet, tactically flexible on the football pitch, and can cross and pass through good diagonal balls to forwards".

== Personal life ==
Aogo was previously engaged to Alessia Walch, the bass player for German country-pop band Mayor's Destiny.

Aogo received the Silbernes Lorbeerblatt in 2010, the highest sports award in Germany.

== Career statistics ==
=== Club ===
Appearances and goals by club, season and competition
| Club | Season | League | | | DFB-Pokal | | Europe | | Other | | Total | |
| Club | Season | Division | Apps | Goals | Apps | Goals | Apps | Goals | Apps | Goals | Apps | Goals |
|---|---|---|---|---|---|---|---|---|---|---|---|---|
| SC Freiburg | 2004–05 | Bundesliga | 15 | 1 | 0 | 0 | – | | – | | 15 | 1 |
| SC Freiburg | 2005–06 | 2. Bundesliga | 27 | 6 | 0 | 0 | – | | – | | 27 | 6 |
| SC Freiburg | 2006–07 | 2. Bundesliga | 19 | 0 | 0 | 0 | – | | – | | 19 | 0 |
| SC Freiburg | 2007–08 | 2. Bundesliga | 33 | 4 | 0 | 0 | – | | – | | 33 | 4 |
| SC Freiburg | Total | | 94 | 11 | 0 | 0 | 0 | 0 | 0 | 0 | 94 | 11 |
| Hamburger SV | 2008–09 | Bundesliga | 23 | 0 | 0 | 0 | 11 (Note: Appearances in UEFA Cup) | 0 | – | | 34 | 0 |
| Hamburger SV | 2009–10 | Bundesliga | 31 | 0 | 2 | 0 | 15 (Note: Appearances in UEFA Europa League) | 0 | – | | 48 | 0 |
| Hamburger SV | 2010–11 | Bundesliga | 20 | 0 | 0 | 0 | – | | – | | 20 | 0 |
| Hamburger SV | 2011–12 | Bundesliga | 30 | 0 | 3 | 1 | – | | – | | 33 | 1 |
| Hamburger SV | 2012–13 | Bundesliga | 27 | 2 | 1 | 0 | – | | – | | 28 | 2 |
| Hamburger SV | 2013–14 | Bundesliga | 2 | 0 | 0 | 0 | – | | – | | 2 | 0 |
| Hamburger SV | Total | | 133 | 2 | 6 | 1 | 26 | 0 | 0 | 0 | 165 | 3 |
| Schalke 04 | 2013–14 | Bundesliga | 10 | 0 | 1 | 0 | 5 (Note: Appearances in UEFA Champions League) | 0 | – | | 16 | 0 |
| Schalke 04 | 2014–15 | Bundesliga | 25 | 0 | 0 | 0 | 7 | 1 | – | | 32 | 1 |
| Schalke 04 | 2015–16 | Bundesliga | 23 | 0 | 2 | 0 | 5 | 0 | – | | 30 | 0 |
| Schalke 04 | 2016–17 | Bundesliga | 7 | 0 | 2 | 1 | 5 | 1 | – | | 14 | 2 |
| Schalke 04 | Total | | 65 | 0 | 5 | 1 | 22 | 2 | 0 | 0 | 92 | 3 |
| VfB Stuttgart | 2017–18 | Bundesliga | 29 | 0 | 1 | 0 | – | | – | | 30 | 0 |
| VfB Stuttgart | 2018–19 | Bundesliga | 15 | 0 | 1 | 0 | – | | 1 (Note: Appearance in Bundesliga relegation play-offs) | 0 | 17 | 0 |
| VfB Stuttgart | Total | | 44 | 0 | 2 | 0 | 0 | 0 | 1 | 0 | 47 | 17 |
| Hannover 96 | 2019–20 | 2. Bundesliga | 4 | 0 | 0 | 0 | – | | – | | 4 | 0 |
| Career Total | | | 340 | 13 | 13 | 2 | 48 | 2 | 1 | 0 | 402 | 17 |

=== International ===
Appearances and goals by national team and year
| National team | Year | App. | Goals | Ref. |
|---|---|---|---|---|
| Germany | 2010 | 3 | 0 | |
| Germany | 2011 | 6 | 0 | |
| Germany | 2012 | 1 | 0 | |
| Germany | 2013 | 2 | 0 | |
| Total | | 12 | 0 | |

== Honours ==
Germany U21

- UEFA European Under-21 Championship: 2009

Germany

- FIFA World Cup third place: 2010

Individual

- Silbernes Lorbeerblatt: 2010
