= Dubrave (Brčko) =

Dubrave Дубраве
- Village
- Location within Bosnia and Herzegovina
- Country: Bosnia and Herzegovina
- Entity: Brčko District

Area
  - Total: 5.46 sq mi (14.15 km^{2})

Population (2013)
  - Total: 1,463
  - Density: 267.8/sq mi (103.4/km^{2})
- Time zone: UTC+1 (CET)
  - Summer (DST): UTC+2 (CEST)

Dubrave (Serbian Cyrillic: Дубраве) is a village in the municipality of Brčko, Bosnia and Herzegovina.

== Demographics ==
According to the 2013 census, its population was 1,463.

Ethnicity in 2013
| Ethnicity | Number | Percentage |
|---|---|---|
| Croats | 1,441 | 98.5% |
| Bosniaks | 7 | 0.5% |
| Serbs | 6 | 0.4% |
| other/undeclared | 9 | 0.6% |
| Total | 1,463 | 100% |
