= Gerrit Pressel =

German footballer

Personal information
- Full name: Gerrit Alexander Pressel
- Date of birth: 19 June 1990 (age 36)
- Place of birth: Hamburg, West Germany
- Height: 1.80 m (5 ft 11 in)
- Position: Left-back

Youth career
- 2006–2009: Hamburger SV

Senior career*
| Years | Team | Apps | (Gls) |
| 2009–2012 | Hamburger SV II | 68 | (5) |
| 2011–2012 | Hamburger SV | 0 | (0) |
| 2011 | → Willem II (loan) | 6 | (0) |
| 2012–2014 | Holstein Kiel | 22 | (0) |
| 2014–2015 | FC Eintracht Norderstedt 03 | 19 | (1) |
| 2015–2016 | SC Poppenbüttel | | |
| 2016–2020 | FC Teutonia Ottensen | 63 | (12) |
| 2021–2023 | SC Victoria Hamburg | 38 | (13) |
- * Club domestic league appearances and goals as of 05:47, 4 July 2024 (UTC)

Gerrit Alexander Pressel (born 19 June 1990) is a German professional footballer who most recently played as a left-back for SC Victoria Hamburg.

== Career ==
Pressel made his senior debut for Willem II in the 2010–11 season, on loan from Hamburger SV. He had previously made over 50 appearances for Hamburger SV II. In July 2012, he left Hamburg to join Regionalliga Nord side Holstein Kiel.
