= 2011–12 Hamburger SV season =

Hamburger SV
2011–12 season
- Stadium: Imtech Arena
- Bundesliga: 15th
- DFB-Pokal: Round of 16
- Top goalscorer: League: Mladen Petrić (7 goals); All: Mladen Petrić (8 goals)
Home colours	Away colours	Third colours

The 2011–12 Hamburger SV season was the 124th season in the club's football history. In 2011–12 the club played in the Bundesliga, the top tier of German football. It was the club's 49th season in the Bundesliga, the only club to have played every season in the league since its introduction in 1963.

== Competitions ==
=== Bundesliga ===
==== League table ====
Pos	Team	Pld	W	D	L	GF	GA	GD	Pts	Qualification or relegation
13	FSV Mainz 05	34	9	12	13	47	51	−4	39	
14	FC Augsburg	34	8	14	12	36	49	−13	38	
15	Hamburger SV	34	8	12	14	35	57	−22	36	
16	Hertha BSC (R)	34	7	10	17	38	64	−26	31	Qualification to relegation play-offs
17	1. FC Köln (R)	34	8	6	20	39	75	−36	30	Relegation to 2. Bundesliga

Source: kicker
Rules for classification: 1) points; 2) goal difference; 3) number of goals scored.
(R) Relegated

==== Matches ====
Win Draw Loss

5 August 2011 1	Borussia Dortmund	3–1	Hamburger SV	Dortmund
20:30	Großkreutz 17', 48'; Götze 29'; Lewandowski (yellow card) 84'	Report (in German)	Mancienne (yellow card) 45'; Kačar (yellow card) 66'; Rincón (yellow card) 68'; Tesche 79'	Stadium: Signal Iduna Park; Attendance: 80,720; Referee: Felix Brych

13 August 2011 2	Hamburger SV	2–2	Hertha BSC	Hamburg
15:30	Petrić 25' (pen.); Westermann (yellow card) 51'; Son 61'; Töre (yellow card) 84'	Report (in German)	Mijatović (yellow card) 25', (goal) 88'; Ebert (yellow card) 34'; Torun 43'; Ramos (yellow card) 85'	Stadium: Imtech Arena; Attendance: 52,100; Referee: Wolfgang Stark

20 August 2011 3	Bayern Munich	5–0	Hamburger SV	Munich
15:30	Van Buyten 13'; Ribéry 17'; Robben 34'; Tymoshchuk (yellow card) 48'; Gómez 56'; Rafinha (yellow card) 70'; Olić 80'	Report (in German)	Aogo (yellow card) 7'; Westermann (yellow card) 32'; Mancienne (yellow card) 37'; Jansen (yellow card) 55'	Stadium: Allianz Arena; Attendance: 69,000; Referee: Michael Weiner

27 August 2011 4	Hamburger SV	3–4	1. FC Köln	Hamburg
15:30	Petrić 11' (pen.); Rajković 59'; Son 62'; Aogo (yellow card) 66'	Report (in German)	Chihi 21'; Brečko (yellow card) 24'; Novaković 49', (yellow card) 66'; Clemens 84'; Riether (yellow card) 88'; McKenna 88'	Stadium: Imtech Arena; Attendance: 51,289; Referee: Meyer

10 September 2011 5	Werder Bremen	2–0	Hamburger SV	Bremen
18:30	Pizarro (yellow card) 25', (goal) 52', 78'; Marin (yellow card) 45'; Bargfrede (yellow card) 68'	Report (in German)	Rajković (yellow card) 22'; Guerrero (yellow card) 22'; Mancienne (yellow card) 28'; Jansen (yellow card) 79'; Jarolím (yellow card) 72'	Stadium: Weserstadion; Attendance: 41,600; Referee: Manuel Gräfe

17 September 2011 6	Hamburger SV	0–1	Borussia Mönchengladbach	Hamburg
15:30	Jarolím (yellow card) 35'; Tesche (yellow card) 78'	Report (in German)	Neustädter (yellow card) 33'; Reus (yellow card) 62'; De Camargo 66'; Arango (yellow card) 76'	Stadium: Imtech Arena; Attendance: 55,797; Referee: Peter Sippel

23 September 2011 7	VfB Stuttgart	1–2	Hamburger SV	Stuttgart
20:30	Harnik 18'; Cacau (yellow card) 75'	Report (in German)	Bruma 51' Tesche 67'; Rajković (yellow card) 57'	Stadium: Mercedes-Benz Arena; Attendance: 55,700; Referee: Felix Zwayer

2 October 2011 8	Hamburger SV	1–2	Schalke 04	Hamburg
17:30	Petrić 37', (yellow card) 38'; Tesche (yellow card) 18'; Rincón (yellow card) 55'	Report (in German)	Huntelaar 13', 73'; Höwedes (yellow card) 79'	Stadium: Imtech Arena; Attendance: 54,237; Referee: Knut Kircher

16 October 2011 9	SC Freiburg	1–2	Hamburger SV	Freiburg
15:30	Schuster (yellow card) 24'; Cissé 47'	Report (in German)	Son 12'; Kačar (yellow card) 22'; Petrić (yellow card) 45'; Iličević 73'; Drobný (yellow card) 90+3'	Stadium: Mage Solar Stadion; Attendance: 24,000; Referee: Deniz Aztekin

22 October 2011 10	Hamburger SV	1–1	VfL Wolfsburg	Hamburg
18:30	Rajković (yellow card) 28'; Kačar (yellow card) 38'; Petrić 56'	Report (in German)	Mandžukić 2'; Träsch (yellow card) 79'	Stadium: Imtech Arena; Attendance: 54,378; Referee: Günther Perl

30 October 2011 11	Hamburger SV	1–1	1. FC Kaiserslautern	Hamburg
17:30	Rajković (red card) 22'; Westermann (yellow card) 46'; Diekmeier (yellow card) 59'; Guerrero 64'	Report (in German)	De Wit 38'; Kouemaha (yellow card) 63'; Sakuta-Pasu (yellow card) 71'	Stadium: Imtech Arena; Attendance: 55,348; Referee: Markus Schmidt

5 November 2012 12	Bayer Leverkusen	2–2	Hamburger SV	Leverkusen
18:30	Schürrle 5'; Bender 20'; Derdiyok (yellow card) 75'; Reinartz (yellow card) 81'	Report (in German)	Westermann 34'; Jansen 57'; Rincón (yellow card) 64'	Stadium: BayArena; Attendance: 30,210; Referee: Knut Kircher

20 November 2011 13	Hamburger SV	2–0	1899 Hoffenheim	Hamburg
17:30	Guerrero 25'; Jansen 65'	Report (in German)	Rudy (yellow card) 39'; Compper (yellow card) 43'; Beck (yellow card) 63'	Stadium: Imtech Arena; Attendance: 46,237; Referee: Marco Fritz

26 November 2011 14	Hannover 96	1–1	Hamburger SV	Hannover
18:30	Haggui (yellow card) 34'; Schlaudraff 79'; Pinto (yellow card) 80'	Report (in German)	Bruma 64'; Aogo (yellow card) 78'; Iličević (yellow card) 90+1'	Stadium: AWD-Arena; Attendance: 49,000; Referee: Felix Zwayer

4 December 2011 15	Hamburger SV	2–0	1. FC Nürnberg	Hamburg
15:30	Diekmeier (yellow card) 6'; Bruma (yellow card) 22'; Guerrero 23'; Jansen 62'; Mancienne (yellow card) 71'	Report (in German)	Chandler (yellow card) 72'	Stadium: Imtech Arena; Attendance: 45,473; Referee: Thorsten Kinhöfer

10 December 2011 16	Mainz 05	0–0	Hamburger SV	Mainz
15:30	Pospěch (yellow card) 36'	Report		Stadium: Coface Arena; Attendance: 34,000; Referee: Robert Hartmann

17 December 2011 17	Hamburger SV	1–1	Augsburg	Hamburg
15:30	Guerrero 66'; Töre (yellow card) 67'	Report (in German)	Oehrl 63'	Stadium: Imtech Arena; Attendance: 48,143; Referee: Tobias Welz

22 January 2012 18	Hamburger SV	1–5	Borussia Dortmund	Hamburg
15:30	Bruma (yellow card) 30'; Guerrero 86'	Report (in German)	Großkreutz 16'; Lewandowski 37', 83'; Błaszczykowski 58', 76' (pen.)	Stadium: Imtech Arena; Attendance: 57,000; Referee: Wolfgang Stark

28 January 2012 19	Hertha BSC	1–2	Hamburger SV	Berlin
15:30	Mijatović (yellow card) 41'; Niemeyer (yellow card) 59'; Lasogga 81'; Lell (yellow card) 89'	Report (in German)	Jansen 24'; Petrić 45+1'; Rincón (yellow card) 90+2'	Stadium: Olympiastadion; Attendance: 49,168; Referee: Guido Winkmann

4 February 2012 20	Hamburger SV	1–1	Bayern Munich	Hamburg
18:30	Sala 23'; Westermann (yellow card) 25'; Rincón (yellow card) 63'	Report (in German)	Boateng (yellow card) 56'; Kroos (yellow card) 61'; Olić 71'	Stadium: Imtech Arena; Attendance: 57,000; Referee: Knut Kircher

13 August 2012 21	1. FC Köln	0–1	Hamburger SV	Cologne
17:30	Lanig (yellow card) 43'; Jemal (yellow card) 48'; Geromel (yellow card) 64'	Report (in German)	Sala (yellow card) 61'; Guerrero 88'	Stadium: RheinEnergieStadion; Attendance: 46,500; Referee: Florian Meyer

18 February 2012 22	Hamburger SV	1–3	Werder Bremen	Hamburg
15:30	Jarolím (yellow card) 71'; Petrić 76'	Report (in German)	Marin 9'; Bargfrede (yellow card) 33'; Trybull 45', (yellow card) 84'; Fritz (yellow card) 54'; Arnautović 86'	Stadium: Imtech Arena; Attendance: 56,553; Referee: Thorsten Kinhöfer

24 February 2012 23	Borussia Mönchengladbach	1–1	Hamburger SV	Mönchengladbach
20:30	Reus (yellow card) 39'; Hanke 45'	Report (in German)	Arslan 56', (yellow card) 87'; Rincón (yellow card) 80'; Jarolím (yellow card) 88'	Stadium: Borussia-Park; Attendance: 54,049; Referee: Günter Perl

3 March 2012 24	Hamburger SV	0–4	VfB Stuttgart	Hamburg
15:30	Guerrero (red card) 54'; Jarolím (yellow card) 79'	Report (in German)	Ibišević 23', (yellow card) 32'; Tasci (yellow card) 27'; Kuzmanović 31' (pen.), 47' (pen.), (yellow card) 59'; Harnik 90'	Stadium: Imtech Arena; Attendance: 55,263; Referee: Peter Sippel

11 March 2012 25	Schalke 04	3–1	Hamburger SV	Gelsenkirchen
17:30	Pukki 5'; Metzelder 26'; Huntelaar 33'; Jones (yellow card) 59'; Matip (yellow card) 62'; Jurado (yellow card) 64'	Report (in German)	Westermann (yellow card) 32'; Kačar 45', (yellow card) 90+1'; Iličević (yellow card) 53'; Arslan (yellow card) 76'	Stadium: Veltins-Arena; Attendance: 61,673; Referee: Wolfgang Stark

17 March 2012 26	Hamburger SV	1–3	SC Freiburg	Hamburg
15:30	Iličević 75'	Report (in German)	Flum 20'; Caligiuri 43'; Sorg (yellow card) 49'; Makiadi (yellow card) 70', (goal) 72'; Mujdža (yellow card) 82'	Stadium: Imtech Arena; Attendance: 52,414; Referee: Tobias Stieler

23 March 2012 27	VfL Wolfsburg	2–1	Hamburger SV	Wolfsburg
20:30	Josué (yellow card) 36'; Mandžukić 46'; Polák (yellow card) 62'; Lopes (yellow card) 72'; Jiráček (yellow card) 74'; Schäfer 75'	Report (in German)	Berg 47'; Westermann (yellow card) 74'; Rincón (yellow card) 86'	Stadium: Volkswagen Arena; Attendance: 30,000; Referee: Felix Brych

31 March 2012 28	1. FC Kaiserslautern	0–1	Hamburger SV	Kaiserslautern
15:30	Sahan (yellow card) 41'; Bugera (yellow card) 42'; Yahia (yellow card) 50'; Fortounis (yellow card) 79'	Report (in German)	Jansen 28'; Jarolím (yellow card) 78'; Kačar (yellow card) 79'	Stadium: Fritz-Walter-Stadion; Attendance: 44,745; Referee: Thorsten Kinhöfer

8 April 2012 29	Hamburger SV	1–1	Bayer Leverkusen	Hamburg
17:30	Petrić 40'; Aogo (yellow card) 60'	Report (in German)	Friedrich (yellow card) 40'; Schürrle 55'; Jarolím (yellow card) 62'; Rolfes (yellow card) 80'	Stadium: Imtech Arena; Attendance: 54,141; Referee: Wolfgang Stark

11 April 2012 30	1899 Hoffenheim	4–0	Hamburger SV	Sinsheim
20:00	Vestergaard 17'; Schipplock (yellow card) 23' (goal) 59'; Salihović 25' (pen.); Weis (yellow card) 31'; Johnson 51'	Report (in German)	Iličević (yellow card) 34'; Drobný (yellow card) 45'; Rincón (yellow card) 77'	Stadium: Rhein-Neckar-Arena; Attendance: 27,000; Referee: Markus Wingenbach

14 April 2012 31	Hamburger SV	1–0	Hannover 96	Hamburg
15:30	Son 12'; Jarolím (yellow card) 52'; Sala (yellow card) 89'	Report (in German)	Haggui (yellow card) 74'; Pinto (yellow card) 82'	Stadium: Imtech Arena; Attendance: 57,000; Referee: Günther Perl

21 April 2012 32	1. FC Nürnberg	1–1	Hamburger SV	Nuremberg
15:30	Didavi 64'	Report (in German)	Jarolím (yellow card) 11'; Son 59'	Stadium: Easy-Credit-Stadion; Attendance: 45,873; Referee: Peter Gagelmann

28 April 2012 33	Hamburger SV	0–0	Mainz 05	Hamburg
15:30		Report (in German)	Caligiuri (yellow card) 38'	Stadium: Imtech Arena; Attendance: 56,537; Referee: Florian Meyer

5 May 2012 34	FC Augsburg	1–0	Hamburger SV	Augsburg
15:30	Koo 34', (yellow card) 85'; Rafael (yellow card) 76'	Report (in German)	Guerrero (yellow card) 63'; Aogo (yellow card) 70'	Stadium: SGL arena Attendance: 30,660; Referee: Manuel Gräfe

=== DFB-Pokal ===
30 July 2011 1st Round	VfB Oldenburg	1–2	Hamburger SV	Oldenburg
15:30	Sebastian Gerrulli 34'; Ari Mehmet (yellow card) 40'; Jan Löhmannsröben (yellow card) 52'	Report	Jarolím (yellow card) 20'; Diekmeier (yellow card) 21'; Westermann 26'; Petrić 72'	Stadium: Marschweg-Stadion; Attendance: 15,552; Referee: Peter Gagelmann

25 October 2011 2nd Round	Eintracht Trier	1–2 (a.e.t.)	Hamburger SV	Trier
20:30	Kulabas 9'; Abelski (yellow card) 59'; Karikari (yellow card) 65'; Drescher (yellow card) 90'	Report	Jarolím (yellow card) 28'; Berg 63', (yellow card) 87'; Aogo 110'	Stadium: Moselstadion; Attendance: 10,300; Referee: Robert Hartmann

21 December 2011 Round of 16	VfB Stuttgart	2–1	Hamburger SV	Stuttgart
20:30	Cacau 23', 62'	Report	Guerrero (yellow card) 34'; Kvist 54' (o.g.); Petrić (yellow card) 56'	Stadium: Mercedes-Benz Arena; Attendance: 38,600; Referee: Peter Gagelmann

== Squad and statistics ==
=== Squad ===
No.	Pos	Nat	Player	Total		Bundesliga		DFB-Pokal	
No.	Pos	Nat	Player	Apps	Goals	Apps	Goals	Apps	Goals
1	GK	(Czech Republic) CZE	Jaroslav Drobný	0	0	0	0	0	0
30	GK	(Germany) GER	Sven Neuhaus	0	0	0	0	0	0
6	DF	(Germany) GER	Dennis Aogo	0	0	0	0	0	0
5	DF	(Netherlands) NED	Jeffrey Bruma	0	0	0	0	0	0
2	DF	(Germany) GER	Dennis Diekmeier	0	0	0	0	0	0
38	DF	(Germany) GER	Zhi-Gin Lam	0	0	0	0	0	0
3	DF	(England) ENG	Michael Mancienne	0	0	0	0	0	0
23	DF	(Serbia) SRB	Slobodan Rajković	0	0	0	0	0	0
4	DF	(Germany) GER	Heiko Westermann	0	0	0	0	0	0
28	MF	(Germany) GER	Tolgay Arslan	0	0	0	0	0	0
32	MF	(Tunisia) TUN	Änis Ben-Hatira	0	0	0	0	0	0
18	MF	(Netherlands) NED	Romeo Castelen	0	0	0	0	0	0
11	MF	(Croatia) CRO	Ivo Iličević	0	0	0	0	0	0
7	MF	(Germany) GER	Marcell Jansen	0	0	0	0	0	0
14	MF	(Czech Republic) CZE	David Jarolím	0	0	0	0	0	0
44	MF	(Serbia) SRB	Gojko Kačar	0	0	0	0	0	0
8	MF	(Venezuela) VEN	Tomás Rincón	0	0	0	0	0	0
22	MF	(Italy) ITA	Jacopo Sala	0	0	0	0	0	0
25	MF	(Norway) NOR	Per Ciljan Skjelbred	0	0	0	0	0	0
13	MF	(Germany) GER	Robert Tesche	0	0	0	0	0	0
17	MF	(Turkey) TUR	Gökhan Töre	0	0	0	0	0	0
16	FW	(Sweden) SWE	Marcus Berg	0	0	0	0	0	0
11	FW	(Netherlands) NED	Eljero Elia	0	0	0	0	0	0
9	FW	(Peru) PER	Paolo Guerrero	0	0	0	0	0	0
10	FW	(Croatia) CRO	Mladen Petrić	0	0	0	0	0	0
15	FW	(South Korea) KOR	Son Heung-min	0	0	0	0	0	0

== Kits ==
Home	Home Alternate	Home Alt. 2	Away	Third

Type	Shirt	Shorts	Socks	First appearance / Info
Home	White	Red	Blue	
Home Alt.	White	Red	White	DFB-Pokal, Round 1, 30 July in Oldenburg
Home Alt. 2	White	White	White	DFB-Pokal, Round 3, 21 December in Stuttgart
Away	Black	Black	Black	
Third	Red	Red	Red	-> 2010-11 Third Shorts
