= Miroslav Štěpánek (footballer) =

Czech footballer (born 1990)

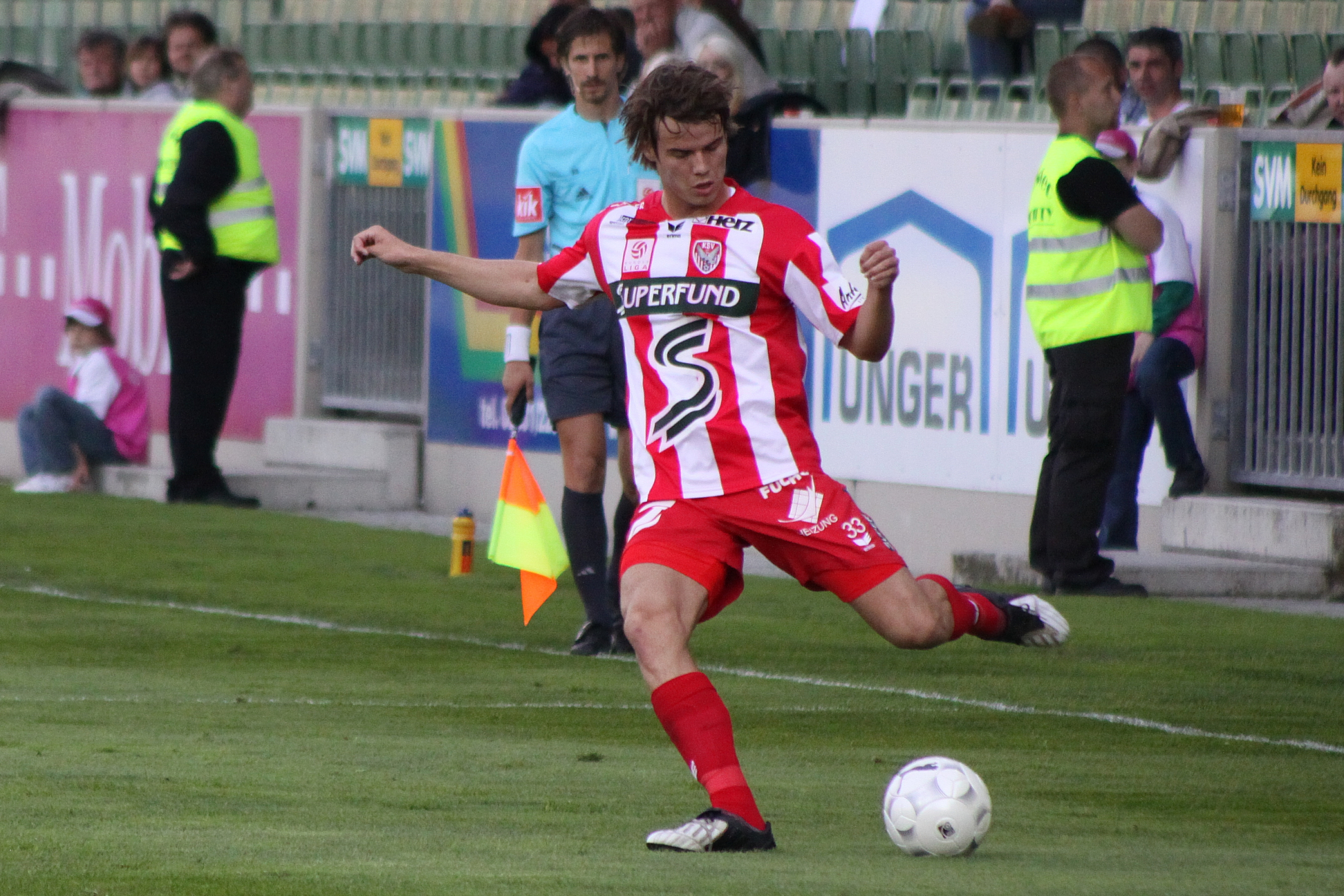

Personal information
- Full name: Miroslav Štěpánek
- Date of birth: 15 January 1990 (age 36)
- Place of birth: Olomouc, Czechoslovakia
- Height: 1.92 m (6 ft 4 in)
- Position: Centre back

Team information
- Current team: MSV Duisburg II

Youth career
- Sigma Olomouc
- 2006–2008: Hamburger SV

Senior career*
Years	Team	Apps	(Gls)
2008–2012	Hamburger SV	0	(0)
2008–2012	Hamburger SV II	17	(0)
2008–2009	→ Kapfenberger SV (loan)	11	(0)
2012	FK Senica	1	(0)
2013–	Duisburg II	10	(0)

International career^{‡}
2007–2008	Czech Republic U19	9	(0)
2009–2012	Czech Republic U21	3	(0)
- * Club domestic league appearances and goals as of 26 April 2013 ‡ National team caps and goals as of 31 December 2012

Miroslav Štěpánek (born 15 January 1990) is a Czech footballer playing for MSV Duisburg II. His last clubs were FK Senica and Hamburger SV.
