= Armin Veh =

German football player and manager (born 1961)

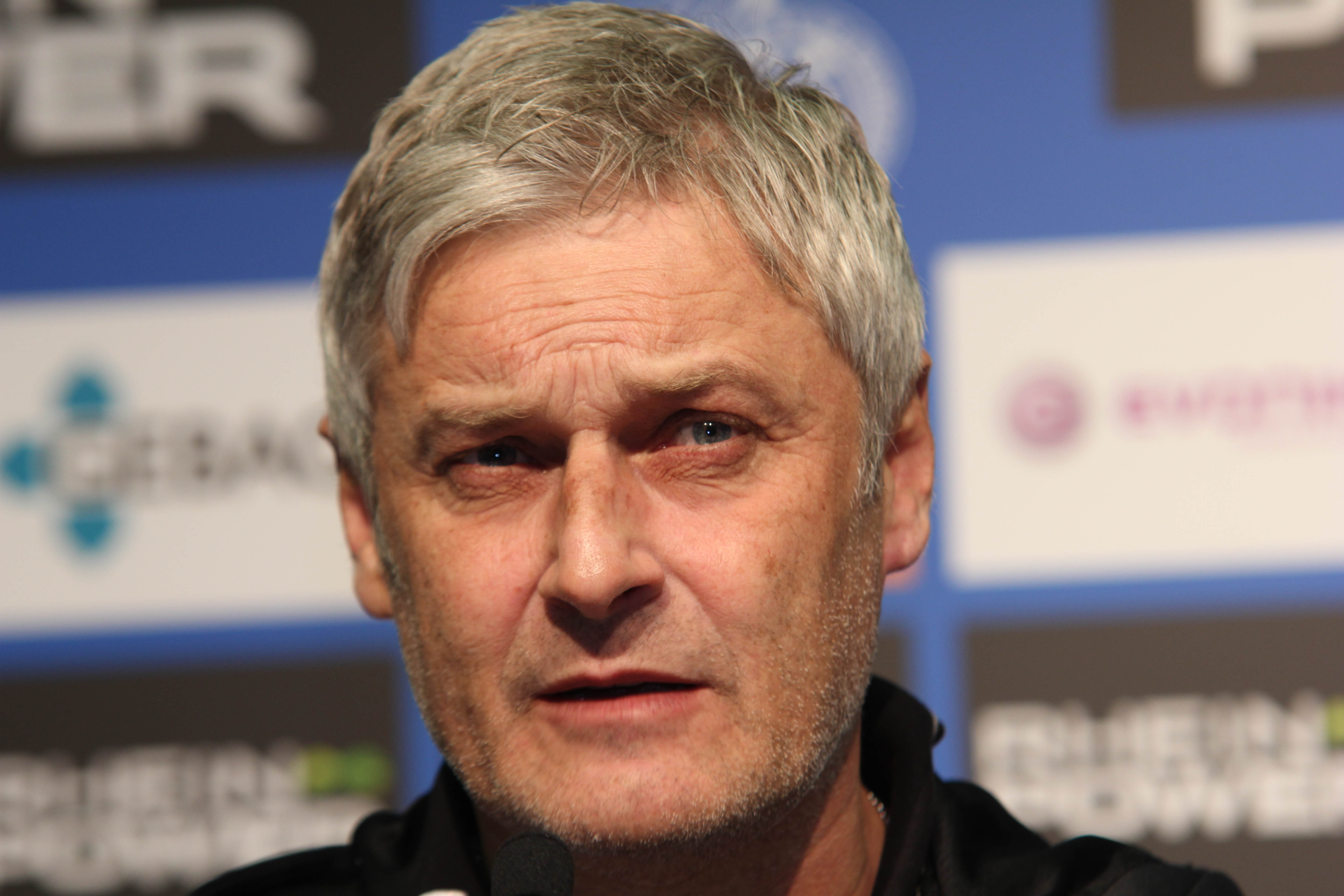
- Veh with Eintracht Frankfurt in 2012

Personal information
- Date of birth: 1 February 1961 (age 65)
- Place of birth: Augsburg, West Germany
- Height: 1.81 m (5 ft 11 in)
- Position: Midfielder

Youth career
- 1978–1979: FC Augsburg

Senior career*
Years	Team	Apps	(Gls)
1979	FC Augsburg	7	(0)
1979–1983	Borussia Mönchengladbach	60	(3)
1983–1984	St. Gallen	18	(0)
1984–1985	Borussia Mönchengladbach	5	(0)
1985–1987	FC Augsburg		
1987	Schwaben Augsburg	15	(1)
1987–1990	SpVgg Bayreuth	53	(1)

Managerial career
- 1990–1995: FC Augsburg
- 1996–1997: Greuther Fürth
- 1998–2001: SSV Reutlingen
- 2002–2003: Hansa Rostock
- 2003–2004: FC Augsburg
- 2006–2008: VfB Stuttgart
- 2009–2010: VfL Wolfsburg
- 2010–2011: Hamburger SV
- 2011–2014: Eintracht Frankfurt
- 2014: VfB Stuttgart
- 2015–2016: Eintracht Frankfurt
- * Club domestic league appearances and goals

Armin Veh (German pronunciation: [ˈaʁmiːn ˈfeː]; born 1 February 1961) is a German football manager and former player who last managed Eintracht Frankfurt. He won the German championship with Bundesliga team VfB Stuttgart in 2007. Veh and his team also had the chance to win "the double" by winning the DFB-Pokal on 26 May 2007 in Berlin, but lost 3–2 in extra time against 1. FC Nürnberg. From 11 December 2017 to 8 December 2019, Veh was the sports director of 1. FC Köln. During his playing career, he played as a midfielder.

== Playing career ==
Born in Augsburg, Veh played from 1979 to 1983 in the Bundesliga at Borussia Mönchengladbach. With Gladbach Veh played in the 1980 UEFA Cup final, losing against Eintracht Frankfurt. In 1984 a broken leg ended his career as a Bundesliga-level pro.

In 1985, Veh resumed playing in his home town for FC Augsburg, moving in 1987 for a few months to local rival TSV Schwaben Augsburg. Due to injuries he played only eight games in the second Bundesliga for SpVgg Bayreuth before retiring in November 1990.

He scored two goals in 65 Bundesliga games, one goal in 60 second Bundesliga games, and appeared in 18 games of Swiss NLA.

== Coaching career ==
Veh was head coach of FC Augsburg from 1990 to 1995.

Veh was head coach of Greuther Fürth between 1 July 1996 and 14 October 1997. His first match was a 2–0 win against Ulm 1846. In the 1996–97 season, Greuther finished second in the league and was promoted to the 2. Bundesliga. Veh also led the team to a Round of 16 berth in the German Cup where they lost 3–1 to Karlsruher SC. He left the club on 14 October 1997. His final match was a 1–0 loss to 1. FC Nürnberg on 6 October 1997.

Veh was head coach of Reutlingen 05 from July 1998 to December 2001. His first match was a 2–0 win against VfB Stuttgart II. Reutlingen's final win of the 1998–99 season came on matchday 28 against Bayern Munich II when they were two points outside the Promotional playoff for the 2. Bundesliga. They finished the season with two draws and four losses in their final six matches and finished the season 12 points outside the promotional playoff spot. In the following season, Reutlingen finished the season by winning 28 out of 34 matches and scoring 102 goals and a +77 goal difference. They finished the season in first place and 26 points above second place and was promoted to the 2. Bundesliga. From 2 October 1999 to 30 October 1999, Reutlingen outscored opposition 23–1. In the 2000–01 season, Reutlingen finished in seventh place and 10 points outside the promotion zone. They started the season with a 3–2 win against 1. FSV Mainz 05 on matchday one and a 4–1 loss to Alemannia Aachen on matchday two. This was followed by a 3–2 extra time loss to Hertha BSC in the German Cup. Veh left the club on 12 December 2001. His final match was a 2–1 loss to 1. FC Schweinfurt 05.

From January 2002, Veh coached Hansa Rostock. His first match was against Bayer Leverkusen. In the 2002–03 season, Veh led Hansa Rostock to a 13th-place finish in the Bundesliga and Round of 16 in the German Cup. Veh resigned in October 2003, a day after losing 3–0 to Bayer Leverkusen.

Veh took over as head coach of Augsburg on 13 October 2003. His first match was a 0–0 draw against Bayern Munich II. Veh was fired on 26 September 2004 after winning two of Augsburg's first eight matches in the 2004–05 season. His final match was a 3–0 loss against VfR Aalen.

Veh was hired by VfB Stuttgart to replace Giovanni Trapattoni on 10 February 2006. His first match was a 2–1 loss against Arminia Bielefeld on matchday 21 of the 2005–06 Bundesliga on 11 February 2006. On 18 April 2006 his contract was extended until summer 2007, and on 19 January 2007 for another year.

In May 2007, Veh and VfB Stuttgart scored their biggest successes by winning the Bundesliga on 19 May 2007 and qualifying for the DFB Cup final, which gave Veh and his team the chance to win the "double". The opponent, 1. FC Nürnberg, had beaten Stuttgart twice in the league that season, and prevailed again by beating VfB Stuttgart 3–2 in extra time in Berlin.

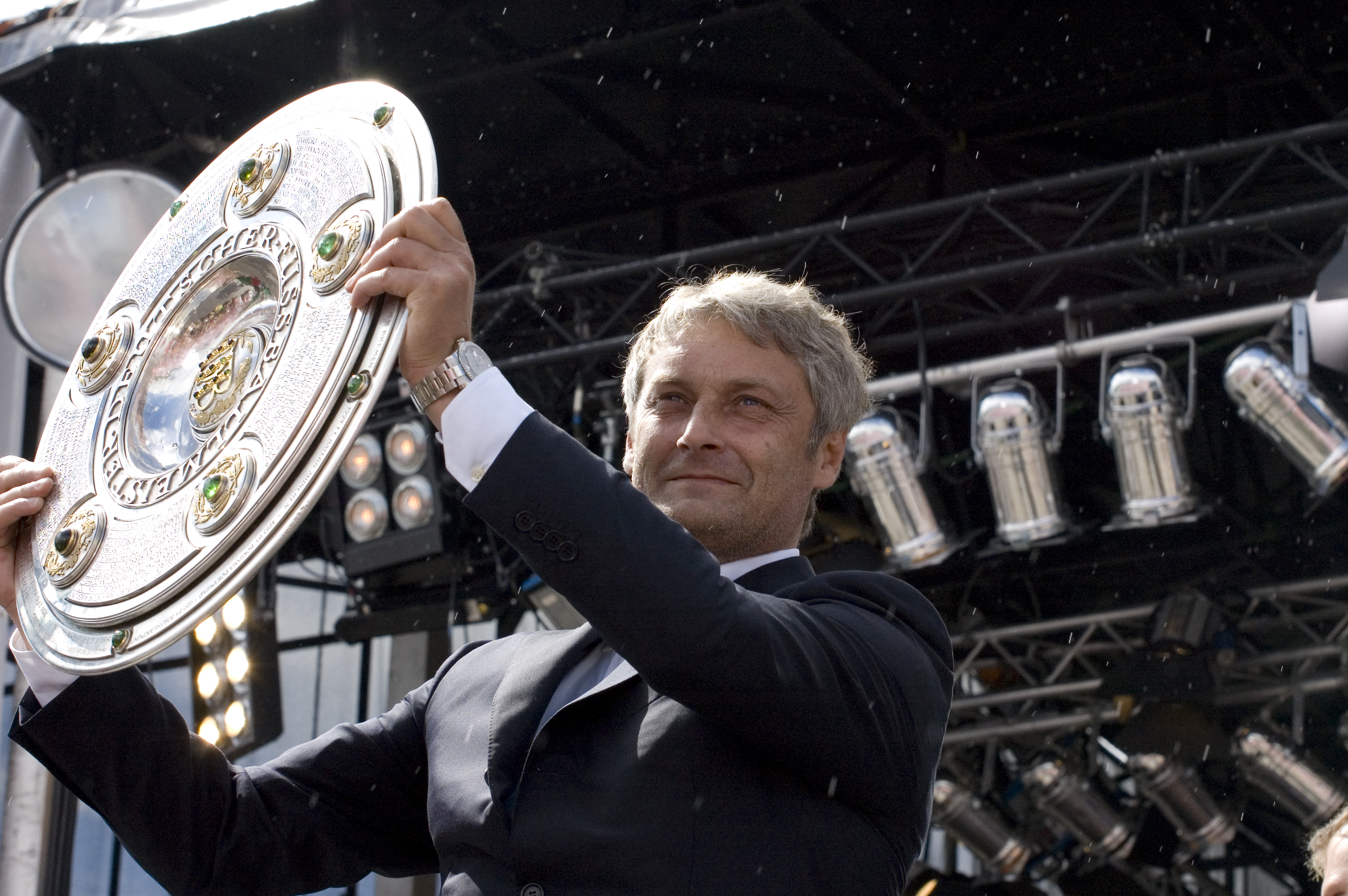
Veh won the Bundesliga with Stuttgart in 2007.

In the 2007–08 season Stuttgart found it tougher as champions and finished sixth. On 23 November 2008, Veh parted ways with VfB Stuttgart, due to the club's current performances. His dismissal came in the wake of a 4–1 defeat away at VfL Wolfsburg and a 5 match winless streak.

On 23 May 2009, it was announced that Veh would take over newly crowned Bundesliga champions VfL Wolfsburg from the hands of Felix Magath in July. His first match was a 4–1 win against Wehen Wiesbaden in the German Cup. Veh was sacked as head coach of Wolfsburg on 25 January 2010.

On 24 May 2010, he was announced as the new head coach of Hamburger SV. His first match was a 5–1 win against Torgelower SV Greif in the German Cup. On 13 March 2011, Veh was sacked by HSV, following a 6–0 hammering by Bayern Munich in the Bundesliga, six points adrift from a spot that would have allowed them to play in the UEFA Europa League the following season.

On 30 May 2011, Veh was announced as the new head coach of Eintracht Frankfurt. His first match was a 3–2 win in the 2. Bundesliga against Greuther Fürth. After achieving promotion to the Bundesliga in his first season, Veh renewed his expiring contract with Frankfurt for another year. Veh demanded that the club invest more money in the squad or he would leave the club. On 3 March 2014, Veh decided not to renew his contract.

On 12 May 2014, Veh returned to VfB Stuttgart after signing a contract until 2016. His first match was a 2–0 loss to VfL Bochum. He resigned on 23 November 2014 after a 1–0 to FC Augsburg. Stuttgart took nine points from 12 matches and were eliminated in the first round of the German Cup which is the worst start in 40 years for Stuttgart.

After Thomas Schaaf resigned as Eintracht Frankfurt coach, it was announced in June 2015 that Veh would return as coach. He was sacked on 6 March 2016 after five wins in 25 games.

== Managerial statistics ==
As of 6 March 2016

Team	From	To	Record								
Team	From	To	G	W	D	L	GF	GA	GD	Win %	Ref.
FC Augsburg	1 July 1990	30 June 1995	171	83	37	51	297	220	+77	48.54	
Greuther Fürth	1 July 1996	15 October 1997	48	27	10	11	91	51	+40	56.25	
Reutlingen 05	1 July 1998	12 December 2001	122	64	28	30	256	144	+112	52.46	
Hansa Rostock	3 January 2002	6 October 2003	62	18	14	30	80	106	−26	29.03	
FC Augsburg	13 October 2003	27 September 2004	31	12	9	10	51	43	+8	38.71	
VfB Stuttgart	10 February 2006	23 November 2008	125	63	20	42	211	176	+35	50.40	
VfL Wolfsburg	1 July 2009	25 January 2010	27	9	7	11	50	50	+0	33.33	
Hamburger SV^{1}	1 July 2010	13 March 2011	27	12	4	11	42	43	−1	44.44	
Eintracht Frankfurt	30 May 2011	12 May 2014	119	54	28	37	197	153	+44	45.38	
VfB Stuttgart	12 May 2014	23 November 2014	13	2	3	8	14	28	−14	15.38	
Eintracht Frankfurt	14 June 2015	6 March 2016	27	6	9	12	31	41	−10	22.22	
Total			772	350	169	253	1,230	1,055	+175	45.34	—

- 1.Didn't coach Hamburg in their second round German Cup match against Eintracht Frankfurt.

== Honours ==
=== As a manager ===
VfB Stuttgart

- Bundesliga: 2006–07

Individual

- German Football Manager of the Year: 2007
