= 2015–16 VfB Stuttgart season =

VfB Stuttgart
2015–16 season
- Chairman: Bernd Wahler
- Manager: Alexander Zorniger (sacked 24 November 2015); Jürgen Kramny (appointed 20 December 2015)
- Stadium: Mercedes-Benz Arena, Stuttgart
- Bundesliga: 17th (relegated)
- DFB-Pokal: Quarter-finals
- Top goalscorer: League: Daniel Didavi (13); All: Daniel Didavi (14)
| Home colours | Away colours | Third colours |

The 2015–16 VfB Stuttgart season was the 123rd season in the club's football history. In 2015–16, the club played in the Bundesliga, the premier tier of German football.

== Squad ==
As of 1 February 2016

Note: Flags indicate national team as defined under FIFA eligibility rules; some limited exceptions apply. Players may hold more than one non-FIFA nationality.

| No. | Pos. | Nation | Player |
|---|---|---|---|
| 1 | GK | AUS | Mitchell Langerak |
| 2 | DF | ARG | Emiliano Insúa |
| 3 | DF | GER | Daniel Schwaab |
| 4 | DF | BIH | Toni Šunjić |
| 5 | DF | GER | Timo Baumgartl |
| 6 | DF | GER | Georg Niedermeier (vice-captain) |
| 7 | FW | AUT | Martin Harnik |
| 8 | MF | GER | Lukas Rupp |
| 10 | MF | GER | Daniel Didavi |
| 14 | DF | GER | Philip Heise |
| 15 | DF | GER | Kevin Großkreutz |
| 16 | DF | AUT | Florian Klein |
| 18 | MF | SRB | Filip Kostić |
| 19 | FW | GER | Timo Werner |
| 20 | MF | GER | Christian Gentner (captain) |

| No. | Pos. | Nation | Player |
|---|---|---|---|
| 22 | GK | POL | Przemysław Tytoń |
| 23 | FW | UKR | Artem Kravets (on loan from Dynamo Kyiv) |
| 24 | DF | ITA | Federico Barba (on loan from Empoli) |
| 26 | MF | CIV | Serey Die |
| 27 | MF | GER | Mart Ristl |
| 28 | MF | GER | Marvin Wanitzek |
| 31 | MF | GER | Arianit Ferati |
| 32 | GK | GER | Benjamin Uphoff |
| 33 | FW | GER | Daniel Ginczek |
| 34 | FW | UKR | Borys Tashchy |
| 39 | FW | CZE | Jan Kliment |
| 41 | DF | GER | Stephen Sama |
| 42 | MF | USA | Jerome Kiesewetter |
| 44 | MF | ROU | Alexandru Maxim |

=== Out on loan ===
Note: Flags indicate national team as defined under FIFA eligibility rules; some limited exceptions apply. Players may hold more than one non-FIFA nationality.

| No. | Pos. | Nation | Player |
|---|---|---|---|
| — | DF | GER | Antonio Rüdiger (at Roma until June 2016) |
| — | MF | NZL | Marco Rojas (at Thun until June 2016) |

=== Transfers ===
==== Transferred in ====
| No. | Pos. | Name | Age | Nat | Moving from | Type | Transfer Window | Contract ends | Transfer fee | Sources |
|---|---|---|---|---|---|---|---|---|---|---|
| 1 | Goalkeeper | Mitchell Langerak | 26 | Australia | Borussia Dortmund | Transfer | Summer | 30 June 2018 | €3,500,000 | |
| 2 | Defender | Emiliano Insúa | 26 | Argentina | Atlético Madrid | Transfer | Summer | 30 June 2018 | Free | |
| 4 | Defender | Toni Šunjić | 26 | Bosnia and Herzegovina | Kuban Krasnodar | Transfer | Summer | 30 June 2018 | €3,000,000 | |
| 8 | Midfielder | Lukas Rupp | 24 | Germany | SC Paderborn | Transfer | Summer | 30 June 2018 | Free | |
| 9 | Forward | Robbie Kruse | 26 | Australia | Bayer Leverkusen | Loan | Summer | 30 June 2016 | €750,000 | |
| 14 | Defender | Philip Heise | 24 | Germany | 1. FC Heidenheim | Transfer | Summer | 30 June 2018 | €750,000 | |
| 22 | Goalkeeper | Przemysław Tytoń | 28 | Poland | PSV Eindhoven | Transfer | Summer | 30 June 2017 | €1,000,000 | |
| 27 | Midfielder | Mart Ristl | 18 | Germany | VfB Stuttgart U19 | Promoted | Summer | 30 June 2018 | — | |
| 28 | Midfielder | Marvin Wanitzek | 21 | Germany | VfB Stuttgart II | Promoted | Summer | 30 June 2017 | — | |
| 31 | Midfielder | Arianit Ferati | 17 | Germany | VfB Stuttgart U19 | Promoted | Summer | 30 June 2018 | — | |
| 39 | Forward | Jan Kliment | 21 | Czech Republic | Vysočina Jihlava | Transfer | Summer | 30 June 2019 | €1,000,000 | |
| — | Midfielder | Joshua Kimmich | 20 | Germany | RB Leipzig | Transfer | Summer | — | €1,500,000 | |
| — | Midfielder | Kevin Stöger | 21 | Germany | 1. FC Kaiserslautern | Loan return | Summer | 30 June 2017 | — | |
| 15 | Defender | Kevin Großkreutz | 27 | Germany | Galatasaray | Transfer | Winter | 30 June 2018 | €2,170,000 | |
| 23 | Forward | Artem Kravets | 26 | Ukraine | Dynamo Kyiv | Loan | Winter | 30 June 2016 | €500,000 | |
| 24 | Defender | Federico Barba | 22 | Italy | Empoli | Loan | Winter | 30 June 2016 | €1,000,000 | |
| 32 | Goalkeeper | Benjamin Uphoff | 22 | Germany | VfB Stuttgart II | Promoted | Winter | 30 June 2017 | — | |
| 34 | Forward | Borys Tashchy | 22 | Ukraine | VfB Stuttgart II | Promoted | Winter | 30 June 2018 | — | |

==== Transferred out ====
| No. | Pos. | Name | Age | Nat | Moving to | Type | Transfer Window | Transfer fee | Sources |
|---|---|---|---|---|---|---|---|---|---|
| 1 | Goalkeeper | Sven Ulreich | 26 | Germany | Bayern Munich | Transfer | Summer | €3,500,000 | |
| 2 | Defender | Gōtoku Sakai | 24 | Japan | Hamburger SV | Transfer | Summer | €700,000 | |
| 5 | Defender | Karim Haggui | 31 | Tunisia | Fortuna Düsseldorf | End of contract | Summer | — | |
| 8 | Midfielder | Moritz Leitner | 22 | Germany | Borussia Dortmund | End of loan | Summer | — | |
| 9 | Forward | Vedad Ibišević | 31 | Bosnia and Herzegovina | Hertha BSC | Transfer | Summer | Free | |
| 13 | Midfielder | Oriol Romeu | 23 | Spain | Chelsea | End of loan | Summer | — | |
| 22 | Goalkeeper | Thorsten Kirschbaum | 28 | Germany | 1. FC Nürnberg | Transfer | Summer | €100,000 | |
| 23 | Midfielder | Sercan Sararer | 25 | Turkey | Fortuna Düsseldorf | Transfer | Summer | €500,000 | |
| 23 | Midfielder | Kevin Stöger | 21 | Germany | SC Paderborn | Transfer | Summer | €1,000,000 | |
| 24 | Defender | Antonio Rüdiger | 22 | Germany | Roma | Loan | Summer | €4,000,000 | |
| 25 | Forward | Mohammed Abdellaoue | 29 | Norway | Vålerenga | Transfer | Summer | Free | |
| 27 | Defender | Tim Leibold | 21 | Germany | 1. FC Nürnberg | Transfer | Summer | Free | |
| 34 | Midfielder | Konstantin Rausch | 25 | Germany | Darmstadt 98 | Transfer | Summer | Free | |
| 39 | Midfielder | Robin Yalçın | 21 | Germany | Çaykur Rizespor | Transfer | Summer | €250,000 | |
| — | Midfielder | Joshua Kimmich | 20 | Germany | Bayern Munich | Transfer | Summer | €8,500,000 | |
| 9 | Forward | Robbie Kruse | 27 | Australia | Bayer Leverkusen | End of loan | Winter | — | |
| 11 | Midfielder | Carlos Gruezo | 21 | Ecuador | FC Dallas | Transfer | Winter | €1,500,000 | |
| 17 | Goalkeeper | Odisseas Vlachodimos | 21 | Germany | Panathinaikos | Transfer | Winter | Free | |
| 21 | Midfielder | Adam Hloušek | 27 | Czech Republic | Legia Warsaw | Transfer | Winter | €500,000 | |

== Competitions ==
=== Bundesliga ===
==== League table ====
| Pos | Team | Pld | W | D | L | GF | GA | GD | Pts | Qualification or relegation |
|---|---|---|---|---|---|---|---|---|---|---|
| 14 | Darmstadt 98 | 34 | 9 | 11 | 14 | 38 | 53 | −15 | 38 | |
| 15 | 1899 Hoffenheim | 34 | 9 | 10 | 15 | 39 | 54 | −15 | 37 | |
| 16 | Eintracht Frankfurt (O) | 34 | 9 | 9 | 16 | 34 | 52 | −18 | 36 | Qualification for the relegation play-offs |
| 17 | VfB Stuttgart (R) | 34 | 9 | 6 | 19 | 50 | 75 | −25 | 33 | Relegation to 2. Bundesliga |
| 18 | Hannover 96 (R) | 34 | 7 | 4 | 23 | 31 | 62 | −31 | 25 | Relegation to 2. Bundesliga |

Source: DFB
Rules for classification: 1) Points; 2) Goal difference; 3) Goals scored; 4) Head-to-head points; 5) Head-to-head goal difference; 6) Head-to-head away goals scored; 7) Away goals scored; 8) Play-offs.
(O) Play-off winners; (R) Relegated

==== Results summary ====
| Overall | | | | | | | | Home | | | | | | Away | | | | | |
| Pld | W | D | L | GF | GA | GD | Pts | W | D | L | GF | GA | GD | W | D | L | GF | GA | GD |
|---|---|---|---|---|---|---|---|---|---|---|---|---|---|---|---|---|---|---|---|
| 34 | 9 | 6 | 19 | 50 | 75 | −25 | 33 | 6 | 1 | 10 | 22 | 32 | −10 | 3 | 5 | 9 | 28 | 43 | −15 |

Last updated: 14 May 2016.
Source: Bundesliga

==== Results by round ====
| Round | 1 | 2 | 3 | 4 | 5 | 6 | 7 | 8 | 9 | 10 | 11 | 12 | 13 | 14 | 15 | 16 | 17 | 18 | 19 | 20 | 21 | 22 | 23 | 24 | 25 | 26 | 27 | 28 | 29 | 30 | 31 | 32 | 33 | 34 |
|---|---|---|---|---|---|---|---|---|---|---|---|---|---|---|---|---|---|---|---|---|---|---|---|---|---|---|---|---|---|---|---|---|---|---|
| Ground | H | A | H | A | H | A | H | A | H | A | H | A | H | A | H | A | H | A | H | A | H | A | H | A | H | A | H | A | H | A | H | A | H | A |
| Result | L | L | L | L | L | W | L | D | W | L | W | L | L | L | D | D | W | W | W | W | W | D | L | L | W | D | L | D | L | L | L | L | L | L |
| Position | 15 | 17 | 17 | 17 | 17 | 15 | 17 | 18 | 15 | 16 | 15 | 16 | 16 | 17 | 17 | 18 | 15 | 15 | 15 | 12 | 10 | 11 | 12 | 12 | 11 | 11 | 11 | 12 | 12 | 15 | 15 | 17 | 17 | 17 |

Updated to match(es) played on 14 May 2016. Source: Bundesliga
A = Away; H = Home; W = Win; D = Draw; L = Loss

==== Matches ====
| 16 August 2015 1 | VfB Stuttgart | 1–3 | 1. FC Köln | Stuttgart |
| 17:30 CEST (UTC+02:00) | Baumgartl (yellow card) 34'; Gentner (yellow card) 67'; Insúa (yellow card) 71'; Didavi 79' (pen.) | Report | Sørensen (yellow card) 61'; Vogt (yellow card) 61'; Modeste 75' (pen.); Zoller 77'; Osako 90+2' | Stadium: Mercedes-Benz Arena; Attendance: 59,500; Referee: Wolfgang Stark |

| 22 August 2015 2 | Hamburger SV | 3–2 | VfB Stuttgart | Hamburg |
| 18:30 CEST (UTC+02:00) | Gregoritsch (yellow card) 31'; Iličević 34'; Djourou (yellow card) 48', (goal) 89'; Jung (yellow card) 73'; Lasogga 84' | Report | Ginczek 23', 42'; Rupp (yellow card) 33'; Klein (yellow card) 52' (yellow-red card) 53'; Kostić (yellow card) 68'; Didavi (yellow card) 72' | Stadium: Volksparkstadion; Attendance: 54,618; Referee: Günter Perl |

| 29 August 2015 3 | VfB Stuttgart | 1–4 | Eintracht Frankfurt | Stuttgart |
| 15:30 CEST (UTC+02:00) | Didavi 30', (yellow card) 48'; Tytoń (red card) 67'; Hloušek (yellow card) 86'; Ginczek (yellow card) 89' | Report | Hloušek 11' (o.g.); Chandler (yellow card) 21'; Stendera (yellow card) 26'; Castaignos 42', 87'; Abraham (yellow card) 50'; Seferovic 69' (pen.) | Stadium: Mercedes-Benz Arena; Attendance: 49,327; Referee: Bastian Dankert |

| 12 September 2015 4 | Hertha BSC | 2–1 | VfB Stuttgart | Berlin |
| 15:30 CEST (UTC+02:00) | Haraguchi 14'; Lustenberger 45+3' | Report | Šunjić 36'; Die (yellow card) 45+2'; Kostić (yellow card) 58'; Didavi (yellow card) 60' | Stadium: Olympiastadion; Attendance: 45,994; Referee: Tobias Stieler |

| 20 September 2015 5 | VfB Stuttgart | 0–1 | Schalke 04 | Stuttgart |
| 15:30 CEST (UTC+02:00) | Klein (yellow card) 20'; Insúa (yellow card) 44'; Šunjić (yellow card) 75' | Report | Di Santo (yellow card) 49'; Sané (yellow card) 52', (goal) 53'; Aogo (yellow card) 61' | Stadium: Mercedes-Benz Arena; Attendance: 48,510; Referee: Manuel Gräfe |

| 23 September 2015 6 | Hannover 96 | 1–3 | VfB Stuttgart | Hanover |
| 20:00 CEST (UTC+02:00) | Karaman 14'; Schulz (yellow card) 58'; Saint-Maximin (yellow card) 79'; Sobiech (yellow card) 81' | Report | Gentner 16'; Werner 18'; Didavi (yellow card) 38'; Die (yellow card) 45+1'; Rupp (yellow card) 88'; Maxim 90' | Stadium: HDI-Arena; Attendance: 36,800; Referee: Sascha Stegemann |

| 26 September 2015 7 | VfB Stuttgart | 1–3 | Borussia Mönchengladbach | Stuttgart |
| 15:30 CEST (UTC+02:00) | Baumgartl (yellow card) 16'; Ginczek 40' (pen.); Šunjić (yellow card) 61'; Gentner (yellow card) 64'; Die (yellow card) 88' | Report | Xhaka 16'; Gentner 20' (o.g.); Sommer (yellow card) 78'; Raffael 90' | Stadium: Mercedes-Benz Arena; Attendance: 51,020; Referee: Günter Perl |

| 3 October 2015 8 | TSG Hoffenheim | 2–2 | VfB Stuttgart | Sinsheim |
| 15:30 CEST (UTC+02:00) | Volland 33' (pen.), 77', (yellow card) 78'; Rudy (yellow card) 60'; Schwegler (yellow card) 90+3' | Report | Kliment 64'; Schwaab (yellow card) 73'; Werner 90' | Stadium: Wirsol Rhein-Neckar-Arena; Attendance: 30,150; Referee: Deniz Aytekin |

| 18 October 2015 9 | VfB Stuttgart | 1–0 | FC Ingolstadt | Stuttgart |
| 17:30 CEST (UTC+02:00) | Harnik (yellow card) 4'; Die (yellow card) 12' (yellow-red card) 86'; Didavi 59'; Rupp (yellow card) 67'; Šunjić (yellow card) 89' | Report | Brégerie (yellow card) 90+1' | Stadium: Mercedes-Benz Arena; Attendance: 45,700; Referee: Guido Winkmann |

| 24 October 2015 10 | Bayer Leverkusen | 4–3 | VfB Stuttgart | Leverkusen |
| 15:30 CEST (UTC+02:00) | Bellarabi 57'; Boenisch 70', (yellow card) 86'; Hernández 71'; Mehmedi 89', (yellow card) 90' | Report | Šunjić (yellow card) 45'; Harnik 50'; Didavi 54'; Rupp 60'; Schwaab (yellow card) 81'; Ristl (yellow card) 90+1'; Insúa (yellow card) 90+3' | Stadium: BayArena; Attendance: 30,210; Referee: Felix Brych |

| 1 November 2015 11 | VfB Stuttgart | 2–0 | Darmstadt 98 | Stuttgart |
| 15:30 CET (UTC+01:00) | Tytoń (yellow card) 33'; Die (yellow card) 54'; Klein (yellow card) 58'; Garics 68' (o.g.); Werner 90+4' | Report | Garics (yellow card) 61'; Díaz (yellow card) 90+1' | Stadium: Mercedes-Benz Arena; Attendance: 55,200; Referee: Robert Hartmann |

| 7 November 2015 12 | Bayern Munich | 4–0 | VfB Stuttgart | Munich |
| 15:30 CET (UTC+01:00) | Robben 11'; Douglas Costa 18'; Lewandowski 37'; Müller 40' | Report | | Stadium: Allianz Arena; Attendance: 75,000; Referee: Bastian Dankert |

| 21 November 2015 13 | VfB Stuttgart | 0–4 | FC Augsburg | Stuttgart |
| 15:45 CET (UTC+01:00) | Die (yellow card) 57'; Kliment (yellow card) 68' | Report | Esswein 11'; Baumgartl 17' (o.g.); Callsen-Bracker 36'; Koo (yellow card) 38', (goal) 54' | Stadium: Mercedes-Benz Arena; Attendance: 54,925; Referee: Sascha Stegemann |

| 29 November 2015 14 | Borussia Dortmund | 4–1 | VfB Stuttgart | Dortmund |
| 15:30 CET (UTC+01:00) | Castro 3'; Aubameyang 19', 90+1'; Papastathopoulos (yellow card) 53'; Niedermeier 65' (o.g.) | Report | Didavi 40' | Stadium: Signal Iduna Park; Attendance: 81,359; Referee: Manuel Gräfe |

| 6 December 2015 15 | VfB Stuttgart | 1–1 | Werder Bremen | Stuttgart |
| 15:30 CET (UTC+01:00) | Die (yellow card) 25'; Rupp 33'; Kostić (yellow card) 49' | Report | Bargfrede (yellow card) 30'; Fritz (yellow card) 53'; Ujah 71' | Stadium: Mercedes-Benz Arena; Attendance: 46,590; Referee: Florian Meyer |

| 11 December 2015 16 | Mainz 05 | 0–0 | VfB Stuttgart | Mainz |
| 20:30 CET (UTC+01:00) | Bungert (yellow card) 36' | Report | Rupp (yellow card) 88' | Stadium: Coface Arena; Attendance: 29,104; Referee: Felix Zwayer |

| 19 December 2015 17 | VfB Stuttgart | 3–1 | VfL Wolfsburg | Stuttgart |
| 18:30 CET (UTC+01:00) | Didavi 22', 47'; Kostić 31'; Šunjić (yellow card) 56' (yellow-red card) 70'; Niedermeier (yellow card) 76' | Report | Arnold 14'; Schürrle (yellow card) 68' | Stadium: Mercedes-Benz Arena; Attendance: 47,343; Referee: Felix Brych |

| 23 January 2016 18 | 1. FC Köln | 1–3 | VfB Stuttgart | Cologne |
| 15:30 CET (UTC+01:00) | Modeste 19' (pen.) | Report | Niedermeier (yellow card) 18'; Didavi 36'; Werner 51'; Gentner 83' | Stadium: RheinEnergieSTADION; Attendance: 50,000; Referee: Manuel Gräfe |

| 30 January 2016 19 | VfB Stuttgart | 2–1 | Hamburger SV | Stuttgart |
| 18:30 CET (UTC+01:00) | Großkreutz (yellow card) 20'; Hunt 66' (o.g.); Kravets 88' | Report | Rudņevs 75'; Adler (yellow card) 79'; Hunt (yellow card) 84'; Ostrzolek (yellow card) 90+4' | Stadium: Mercedes-Benz Arena; Attendance: 46,600; Referee: Günter Perl |

| 6 February 2016 20 | Eintracht Frankfurt | 2–4 | VfB Stuttgart | Frankfurt |
| 15:30 CET (UTC+01:00) | Oczipka (yellow card) 37'; Meier 52'; Zambrano (yellow card) 63' (yellow-red card) 75'; Huszti 90' | Report | Gentner 27'; Didavi (yellow card) 36' (yellow-red card) 67', (goal) 45+1'; Großkreutz (yellow card) 51'; Niedermeier 65'; Kostić 76' (pen.) | Stadium: Commerzbank-Arena; Attendance: 42,000; Referee: Peter Sippel |

| 13 February 2016 21 | VfB Stuttgart | 2–0 | Hertha BSC | Stuttgart |
| 15:30 CET (UTC+01:00) | Insúa (yellow card) 34'; Die 51'; Maxim (yellow card) 72'; Großkreutz (yellow card) 78'; Kostić 84' | Report | Skjelbred (yellow card) 61'; Brooks (yellow card) 62'; Haraguchi (yellow card) 67' | Stadium: Mercedes-Benz Arena; Attendance: 45,465; Referee: Christian Dingert |

| 21 February 2016 22 | Schalke 04 | 1–1 | VfB Stuttgart | Gelsenkirchen |
| 17:30 CET (UTC+01:00) | Belhanda 14', (yellow card) 69'; Schöpf (yellow card) 75'; Sané (yellow card) 81' | Report | Didavi (yellow card) 28'; Harnik 74' | Stadium: Veltins-Arena; Attendance: 61,262; Referee: Bastian Dankert |

| 27 February 2016 23 | VfB Stuttgart | 1–2 | Hannover 96 | Stuttgart |
| 15:30 CET (UTC+01:00) | Werner 18'; Niedermeier (yellow card) 54' | Report | Schulz 32', 83'; Hoffmann (yellow card) 56'; Yamaguchi (yellow card) 65'; Sorg (yellow card) 72' | Stadium: Mercedes-Benz Arena; Attendance: 54,356; Referee: Sascha Stegemann |

| 2 March 2016 24 | Borussia Mönchengladbach | 4–0 | VfB Stuttgart | Mönchengladbach |
| 20:00 CET (UTC+01:00) | Hazard 16', (yellow card) 54'; Raffael 60'; Herrmann 68'; Großkreutz 90+1' (o.g.) | Report | Die (yellow card) 44'; Harnik (yellow card) 83' | Stadium: Stadion im Borussia-Park; Attendance: 43,627; Referee: Tobias Welz |

| 5 March 2016 25 | VfB Stuttgart | 5–1 | TSG Hoffenheim | Stuttgart |
| 15:30 CET (UTC+01:00) | Niedermeier 5', 51'; Kravets (yellow card) 14'; Rupp 42'; Kostić 78'; Werner 83' | Report | Süle (yellow card) 60'; Kramarić 73'; Polanski (yellow card) 80' | Stadium: Mercedes-Benz Arena; Attendance: 47,677; Referee: Christian Dingert |

| 12 March 2016 26 | FC Ingolstadt | 3–3 | VfB Stuttgart | Ingolstadt |
| 15:30 CET (UTC+01:00) | Hartmann 4' da Costa (yellow card) 54'; Leckie 56'; Lezcano 61'; Hübner (yellow card) 70' | Report | Kostić 9'; Niedermeier (yellow card) 22'; Didavi (yellow card) 62', (goal) 84' (pen.); Rupp 79'; Gentner (yellow card) 87' | Stadium: Audi Sportpark; Attendance: 15,107; Referee: Manuel Gräfe |

| 20 March 2016 27 | VfB Stuttgart | 0–2 | Bayer Leverkusen | Stuttgart |
| 15:30 CET (UTC+01:00) | Niedermeier (yellow card) 32'; Die (yellow card) 61'; Kostić (yellow card) 88' | Report | Brandt 11'; Ramalho (yellow card) 31'; Kießling (yellow card) 44'; Bellarabi 49'; Yurchenko (yellow card) 82' | Stadium: Mercedes-Benz Arena; Attendance: 54,522; Referee: Daniel Siebert |

| 2 April 2016 28 | Darmstadt 98 | 2–2 | VfB Stuttgart | Darmstadt |
| 15:30 CEST (UTC+02:00) | Wagner 26'; Niemeyer 51', (yellow card) 62'; Jungwirth (yellow card) 70'; Rausch (yellow card) 88'; Heller (yellow card) 90' | Report | Gentner 45'; Rupp 45+3'; Klein (yellow card) 90' | Stadium: Merck-Stadion am Böllenfalltor; Attendance: 17,000; Referee: Felix Zwayer |

| 9 April 2016 29 | VfB Stuttgart | 1–3 | Bayern Munich | Stuttgart |
| 15:30 CEST (UTC+02:00) | Didavi (yellow card) 45+1', (goal) 63' | Report | Vidal (yellow card) 22'; Niedermeier 31' (o.g.); Alonso (yellow card) 37'; Alaba 52', (yellow card) 60'; Douglas Costa 89' | Stadium: Mercedes-Benz Arena; Attendance: 60,000; Referee: Bastian Dankert |

| 16 April 2016 30 | FC Augsburg | 1–0 | VfB Stuttgart | Augsburg |
| 15:30 CEST (UTC+02:00) | Finnbogason 36'; Opare (yellow card) 67'; Kohr (yellow card) 82' | Report | | Stadium: WWK ARENA; Attendance: 30,660; Referee: Tobias Stieler |

| 23 April 2016 31 | VfB Stuttgart | 0–3 | Borussia Dortmund | Stuttgart |
| 15:30 CEST (UTC+02:00) | | Report | Kagawa 21'; Pulisic 45', (yellow card) 49'; Mkhitaryan 56' | Stadium: Mercedes-Benz Arena; Attendance: 60,000; Referee: Daniel Siebert |

| 2 May 2016 32 | Werder Bremen | 6–2 | VfB Stuttgart | Bremen |
| 20:15 CEST (UTC+02:00) | Bartels 10', 80'; Barba 33' (o.g.); Öztunalı 42'; Pizarro 64'; Ujah 86'; Gebre Selassie (yellow card) 90' | Report | Insúa (yellow card) 9'; Didavi 26'; Barba 53' | Stadium: Weserstadion; Attendance: 41,000; Referee: Felix Brych |

| 7 May 2016 33 | VfB Stuttgart | 1–3 | Mainz 05 | Stuttgart |
| 15:30 CEST (UTC+02:00) | Gentner 6'; Didavi (yellow card) 18'; Šunjić (yellow card) 70'; Baumgartl (yellow card) 90' | Report | Bungert (yellow card) 33'; Mallı 37'; Baumgartlinger (yellow card) 53'; Córdoba 53'; Onisiwo 77' | Stadium: Mercedes-Benz Arena; Attendance: 60,000; Referee: Deniz Aytekin |

| 14 May 2016 34 | VfL Wolfsburg | 3–1 | VfB Stuttgart | Wolfsburg |
| 15:30 CEST (UTC+02:00) | Arnold 11'; Schürrle 29', 90+2'; Kruse (yellow card) 36'; Dante (yellow card) 85' | Report | Kostić (yellow card) 55'; Didavi 78'; Schwaab (yellow card) 88' | Stadium: Volkswagen Arena; Attendance: 30,000; Referee: Manuel Gräfe |

=== DFB-Pokal ===
| 8 August 2015 Round 1 | Holstein Kiel | 1–2 | VfB Stuttgart | Kiel |
| 20:30 CEST (UTC+02:00) | Czichos 37'; Herrmann (yellow card) 43' | Report | Didavi 41'; Gruezo (yellow card) 58'; Ginczek 60'; Rupp (yellow card) 90+1' | Stadium: Holstein-Stadion; Attendance: 9,916; Referee: Guido Winkmann |

| 28 October 2015 Round 2 | Carl Zeiss Jena | 0–2 | VfB Stuttgart | Jena |
| 20:30 CET (UTC+01:00) | Krstić (yellow card) 36'; Eismann (yellow card) 80'; Koczor (yellow card) 81'; Erlbeck (red card) 90+1' | Report | Harnik 22'; Wanitzek (yellow card) 88'; Maxim 90+2' (pen.) | Stadium: Ernst-Abbe-Sportfeld; Attendance: 18,000; Referee: Florian Meyer |

| 16 December 2015 Round of 16 | VfB Stuttgart | 3–2 (a.e.t.) | Eintracht Braunschweig | Stuttgart |
| 19:00 CET (UTC+01:00) | Niedermeier 21', (yellow card) 106'; Gentner (yellow card) 71'; Werner 99'; Šunjić 118' | Report | Baffo 6'; Decarli (yellow card) 35'; Ademi 110' | Stadium: Mercedes-Benz Arena; Attendance: 21,950; Referee: Peter Sippel |

| 9 February 2016 Quarter-finals | VfB Stuttgart | 1–3 | Borussia Dortmund | Stuttgart |
| 20:30 CET (UTC+01:00) | Rupp 21'; Niedermeier (yellow card) 34'; Großkreutz (yellow card) 46'; Didavi (yellow card) 62' | Report | Reus 5'; Aubameyang 31'; Papastathopoulos (yellow card) 83'; Mkhitaryan 89' | Stadium: Mercedes-Benz Arena; Attendance: 46,500; Referee: Tobias Stieler |

== Statistics ==
=== Appearances and goals ===
| No. | Pos | Nat | Player | Total | | Bundesliga | | DFB-Pokal | |
| No. | Pos | Nat | Player | Apps | Goals | Apps | Goals | Apps | Goals |
Goalkeepers
| 1 | GK | (Australia) AUS | Mitchell Langerak | 3 | 0 | 2 | 0 | 1 | 0 |
| 22 | GK | (Poland) POL | Przemysław Tytoń | 33 | 0 | 30 | 0 | 3 | 0 |
| 32 | GK | (Germany) GER | Benjamin Uphoff | 0 | 0 | 0 | 0 | 0 | 0 |
Defenders
| 2 | DF | (Argentina) ARG | Emiliano Insúa | 37 | 0 | 33 | 0 | 4 | 0 |
| 3 | DF | (Germany) GER | Daniel Schwaab | 32 | 0 | 29 | 0 | 3 | 0 |
| 4 | DF | (Bosnia and Herzegovina) BIH | Toni Šunjić | 22 | 2 | 19 | 1 | 3 | 1 |
| 5 | DF | (Germany) GER | Timo Baumgartl | 21 | 0 | 19 | 0 | 2 | 0 |
| 6 | DF | (Germany) GER | Georg Niedermeier | 20 | 4 | 18 | 3 | 2 | 1 |
| 14 | DF | (Germany) GER | Philip Heise | 6 | 0 | 5 | 0 | 1 | 0 |
| 15 | DF | (Germany) GER | Kevin Großkreutz | 11 | 0 | 10 | 0 | 1 | 0 |
| 16 | DF | (Austria) AUT | Florian Klein | 25 | 0 | 22 | 0 | 3 | 0 |
| 24 | DF | (Italy) ITA | Federico Barba | 2 | 1 | 2 | 1 | 0 | 0 |
| 41 | DF | (Germany) GER | Stephen Sama | 0 | 0 | 0 | 0 | 0 | 0 |
Midfielders
| 8 | MF | (Germany) GER | Lukas Rupp | 33 | 6 | 29 | 5 | 4 | 1 |
| 10 | MF | (Germany) GER | Daniel Didavi | 35 | 14 | 31 | 13 | 4 | 1 |
| 18 | MF | (Serbia) SRB | Filip Kostić | 33 | 5 | 30 | 5 | 3 | 0 |
| 20 | MF | (Germany) GER | Christian Gentner | 32 | 5 | 29 | 5 | 3 | 0 |
| 26 | MF | (Ivory Coast) CIV | Serey Dié | 26 | 1 | 23 | 1 | 3 | 0 |
| 27 | MF | (Germany) GER | Mart Ristl | 4 | 0 | 3 | 0 | 1 | 0 |
| 28 | MF | (Germany) GER | Marvin Wanitzek | 1 | 0 | 1 | 0 | 0 | 0 |
| 31 | MF | (Germany) GER | Arianit Ferati | 4 | 0 | 3 | 0 | 1 | 0 |
| 37 | MF | (Germany) GER | Matthias Zimmermann | 2 | 0 | 2 | 0 | 0 | 0 |
| 44 | MF | (Romania) ROU | Alexandru Maxim | 27 | 2 | 25 | 1 | 2 | 1 |
Forwards
| 7 | FW | (Austria) AUT | Martin Harnik | 21 | 3 | 19 | 2 | 2 | 1 |
| 19 | FW | (Germany) GER | Timo Werner | 36 | 7 | 33 | 6 | 3 | 1 |
| 23 | FW | (Ukraine) UKR | Artem Kravets | 16 | 1 | 15 | 1 | 1 | 0 |
| 33 | FW | (Germany) GER | Daniel Ginczek | 8 | 4 | 7 | 3 | 1 | 1 |
| 34 | FW | (Ukraine) UKR | Borys Tashchy | 10 | 0 | 9 | 0 | 1 | 0 |
| 39 | FW | (Czech Republic) CZE | Jan Kliment | 10 | 1 | 8 | 1 | 2 | 0 |
| 42 | FW | (United States) USA | Jerome Kiesewetter | 0 | 0 | 0 | 0 | 0 | 0 |
Players transferred out during the season
| 9 | FW | (Bosnia and Herzegovina) BIH | Vedad Ibišević | 3 | 0 | 2 | 0 | 1 | 0 |
| 9 | FW | (Australia) AUS | Robbie Kruse | 4 | 0 | 3 | 0 | 1 | 0 |
| 11 | MF | (Ecuador) ECU | Carlos Gruezo | 3 | 0 | 2 | 0 | 1 | 0 |
| 17 | GK | (Germany) GER | Odisseas Vlachodimos | 3 | 0 | 3 | 0 | 0 | 0 |
| 21 | DF | (Czech Republic) CZE | Adam Hloušek | 10 | 0 | 7 | 0 | 3 | 0 |
| 24 | DF | (Germany) GER | Antonio Rüdiger | 0 | 0 | 0 | 0 | 0 | 0 |

Last updated: 14 May 2016
Source: Competitions
