= 2015–16 Hamburger SV season =

Hamburger SV
2015–16 season
- President: Carl-Edgar Jarchow
- Head coach: Bruno Labbadia
- Stadium: Volksparkstadion, Hamburg
- Bundesliga: 10th
- DFB-Pokal: First round
Home colours	Away colours	Third colours

The 2015–16 Hamburger SV season was the 128th season in the club's football history. In 2015–16 the club played in the Bundesliga, the top tier of German football. It was the club's 53rd consecutive season in this league, being the only club to have played every season in the Bundesliga since its introduction in 1963.

== First team squad ==
As of September 2015, according to the official website.

Note: Flags indicate national team as defined under FIFA eligibility rules; some limited exceptions apply. Players may hold more than one non-FIFA nationality.

No.	Pos.	Nation	Player
1	GK	CZE	Jaroslav Drobný
2	DF	GER	Dennis Diekmeier
3	DF	BRA	Cléber
4	DF	BIH	Emir Spahić
5	DF	SUI	Johan Djourou (vice-captain)
7	MF	CRO	Ivo Iličević
8	MF	GER	Lewis Holtby
9	FW	GER	Sven Schipplock
10	FW	GER	Pierre-Michel Lasogga
11	FW	CRO	Ivica Olić
14	MF	GER	Aaron Hunt
15	GK	GER	René Adler
16	FW	LAT	Artjoms Rudņevs
17	MF	HUN	Zoltán Stieber
19	FW	GER	Abdullah Bidav

No.	Pos.	Nation	Player
20	MF	SWE	Albin Ekdal
21	MF	CHI	Marcelo Díaz
22	DF	GER	Matthias Ostrzolek
23	FW	AUT	Michael Gregoritsch
24	DF	JPN	Gōtoku Sakai
26	FW	GER	Philipp Müller
27	MF	GER	Nicolai Müller
28	DF	GER	Gideon Jung
30	GK	SUI	Andreas Hirzel
31	DF	MOZ	Ronny Marcos
33	FW	TUR	Batuhan Altıntaş
34	MF	GER	Finn Porath
39	DF	GER	Ashton Götz
40	MF	SRB	Gojko Kačar

== Transfers ==
=== In ===
Date	Position	Name	From	Fee	Ref.
1 July 2015	MF	Lewis Holtby	Tottenham Hotspur	€6,500,000	
4 July 2015	FW	Batuhan Altıntaş	Bursaspor	€400,000	
5 July 2015	DF	Emir Spahić	(Bayer Leverkusen)	Free transfer	
6 July 2015	DF	Gōtoku Sakai	VfB Stuttgart	€700,000	
17 July 2015	GK	Andreas Hirzel	FC Vaduz	€50,000	
18 July 2015	MF	Albin Ekdal	Cagliari	€4,500,000	
23 July 2015	FW	Michael Gregoritsch	VfL Bochum	€3,000,000	
24 July 2015	FW	Sven Schipplock	1899 Hoffenheim	Undisclosed	
1 September 2015	MF	Aaron Hunt	VfL Wolfsburg	Undisclosed	
1 February 2016	FW	Nabil Bahoui	(Al-Ahli)	Free transfer	

=== Loans in ===
Date	Position	Name	Club	Return	Ref.
1 February 2016	FW	Josip Drmić	Borussia Mönchengladbach	End of season	

=== Out ===
Date	Position	Name	To	Fee	Ref.
26 June 2015	MF	Maximilian Beister	Mainz 05	Contract terminated	
26 June 2015	DF	Lasse Sobiech	FC St. Pauli	Free transfer	
30 June 2015	DF	Marcell Jansen		Retired	
30 June 2015	DF	Slobodan Rajković		Released	
30 June 2015	MF	Rafael van der Vaart	(Real Betis)	Released	
30 June 2015	DF	Heiko Westermann	Real Betis	Released	
3 July 2015	GK	Alexander Brunst	VfL Wolfsburg II	€200,000	
11 July 2015	MF	Valon Behrami	Watford	Undisclosed	
16 July 2015	DF	Jonathan Tah	Bayer Leverkusen	€7,500,000	
7 August 2015	FW	Jacques Zoua	AC Ajaccio	Free transfer	
24 August 2015	MF	Petr Jiráček	Sparta Prague	Contract terminated	
9 January 2016	DF	Ronny Marcos	Greuther Fürth	Undisclosed	
15 January 2016	MF	Marcelo Díaz	Celta Vigo	€2,000,000	

=== Loans out ===
Date	Position	Name	Club	Return	Ref.
23 July 2015	MF	Matti Steinmann	Chemnitzer FC	End of season	
25 August 2015	MF	Kerem Demirbay	Fortuna Düsseldorf	End of season	
26 August 2015	FW	Mohamed Gouaida	Karlsruher SC	End of season	
18 January 2016	FW	Zoltán Stieber	1. FC Nürnberg	End of season	

== Competitions ==
Win Draw Loss

=== Bundesliga ===
==== League table ====
Pos	Team	Pld	W	D	L	GF	GA	GD	Pts
8	VfL Wolfsburg	34	12	9	13	47	49	−2	45
9	1. FC Köln	34	10	13	11	38	42	−4	43
10	Hamburger SV	34	11	8	15	40	46	−6	41
11	FC Ingolstadt	34	10	10	14	33	42	−9	40
12	FC Augsburg	34	9	11	14	42	52	−10	38

Source: DFB
Rules for classification: 1) Points; 2) Goal difference; 3) Goals scored; 4) Head-to-head points; 5) Head-to-head goal difference; 6) Head-to-head away goals scored; 7) Away goals scored; 8) Play-offs.

==== Results summary ====
Overall								Home						Away					
Pld	W	D	L	GF	GA	GD	Pts	W	D	L	GF	GA	GD	W	D	L	GF	GA	GD
34	11	8	15	40	46	−6	41	5	4	8	20	23	−3	6	4	7	20	23	−3

Last updated: 14 May 2016.
Source: Bundesliga

==== Results by round ====
Round	1	2	3	4	5	6	7	8	9	10	11	12	13	14	15	16	17	18	19	20	21	22	23	24	25	26	27	28	29	30	31	32	33	34
Ground	A	H	A	A	H	A	H	A	H	A	H	A	H	A	H	A	H	H	A	A	H	A	H	A	H	A	H	A	H	A	H	A	H	A
Result	L	W	L	W	D	W	L	L	D	W	L	D	W	W	L	D	L	L	L	D	W	D	D	L	W	L	L	W	L	L	W	D	L	W
Position	18	10	13	12	10	6	10	11	12	10	10	11	10	7	9	9	10	11	11	13	11	12	11	11	10	12	12	10	10	12	11	11	12	10

Updated to match(es) played on 14 May 2016. Source: Bundesliga
A = Away; H = Home; W = Win; D = Draw; L = Loss

==== Matches ====
14 August 2015 1	Bayern Munich	5–0	Hamburger SV	Munich
20:30 CEST (UTC+02:00)	Alonso (yellow card) 12'; Boateng (yellow card) 18'; Benatia 27'; Lewandowski 53'; Müller 69', 73'; Douglas Costa 87'	Report	Diekmeier (yellow card) 25'; Spahić (yellow card) 35'	Stadium: Allianz Arena; Attendance: 75,000; Referee: Bastian Dankert

22 August 2015 2	Hamburger SV	3–2	VfB Stuttgart	Hamburg
18:30 CEST (UTC+02:00)	Gregoritsch (yellow card) 31'; Iličević 34'; Djourou (yellow card) 48', (goal) 89'; Jung (yellow card) 73'; Lasogga 84'	Report	Ginczek 23', 42'; Rupp (yellow card) 33'; Klein (yellow card) 52' (yellow-red card) 53'; Kostić (yellow card) 68'; Didavi (yellow card) 72'	Stadium: Volksparkstadion; Attendance: 54,618; Referee: Günter Perl

29 August 2015 3	1. FC Köln	2–1	Hamburger SV	Cologne
15:30 CEST (UTC+02:00)	Zoller (yellow card) 42'; Vogt (yellow card) 68'; Hosiner 76'; Modeste 81' (pen.); Risse (yellow card) 83'	Report	Holtby 47'; Schipplock (yellow card) 49'; Ekdal (yellow card) 55'; Spahić (red card) 79'	Stadium: RheinEnergieSTADION; Attendance: 50,000; Referee: Deniz Aytekin

11 September 2015 4	Borussia Mönchengladbach	0–3	Hamburger SV	Mönchengladbach
20:30 CEST (UTC+02:00)	Jantschke (yellow card) 58'; Dahoud (yellow card) 88'	Report	Lasogga 11', 44'; Ekdal (yellow card) 35'; N. Müller 52'	Stadium: Stadion im Borussia-Park; Attendance: 54,010; Referee: Tobias Welz

19 September 2015 5	Hamburger SV	0–0	Eintracht Frankfurt	Hamburg
15:30 CEST (UTC+02:00)		Report	Hasebe (yellow card) 9'; Seferovic (yellow card) 65'; Russ (yellow card) 67'; Oczipka (yellow card) 76'	Stadium: Volksparkstadion; Attendance: 55,322; Referee: Wolfgang Stark

22 September 2015 6	FC Ingolstadt	0–1	Hamburger SV	Ingolstadt
20:00 CEST (UTC+02:00)	Hinterseer (yellow card) 52'; Roger (yellow card) 90+1'	Report	Lasogga (yellow card) 33'; Gregoritsch 87'	Stadium: Audi Sportpark; Attendance: 15,000; Referee: Knut Kircher

26 September 2015 7	Hamburger SV	0–1	Schalke 04	Hamburg
18:30 CEST (UTC+02:00)	Djourou (yellow card) 83'	Report	Geis (yellow card) 19'; Sané 60'; Neustädter (yellow card) 64'; Fährmann (yellow card) 90'	Stadium: Volksparkstadion; Attendance: 53,192; Referee: Jochen Drees

3 October 2015 8	Hertha BSC	3–0	Hamburger SV	Berlin
15:30 CEST (UTC+02:00)	Kalou 17'; Haraguchi (yellow card) 53'; Ibišević 76', 78'	Report	N. Müller (yellow card) 64'	Stadium: Olympiastadion; Attendance: 65,427; Referee: Felix Brych

17 October 2015 9	Hamburger SV	0–0	Bayer Leverkusen	Hamburg
15:30 CEST (UTC+02:00)	Hunt (yellow card) 26'; Lasogga (yellow card) 31'; Ekdal (yellow card) 38'; Iličević (yellow card) 59'; Díaz (yellow card) 88'; Spahić (yellow card) 90+1'	Report	Hernández (yellow card) 74'; Jedvaj (yellow card) 75'	Stadium: Volksparkstadion; Attendance: 54,957; Referee: Tobias Welz

23 October 2015 10	TSG Hoffenheim	0–1	Hamburger SV	Sinsheim
20:30 CEST (UTC+02:00)	Bičakčić (yellow card) 11' (yellow-red card) 68'; Polanski (yellow card) 80'; Volland (yellow card) 89'	Report	Holtby (yellow card) 26'; Ostrzolek (yellow card) 57'; Gregoritsch (yellow card) 77'; Schipplock (yellow card) 84'; Lasogga 88'	Stadium: Wirsol Rhein-Neckar-Arena; Attendance: 30,000; Referee: Daniel Siebert

1 November 2015 11	Hamburger SV	1–2	Hannover 96	Hamburg
17:30 CET (UTC+01:00)	Gregoritsch 6'	Report	Kiyotake 59' (pen.); Sané 67'	Stadium: Volksparkstadion; Attendance: 54,607; Referee: Sascha Stegemann

7 November 2015 12	Darmstadt 98	1–1	Hamburger SV	Darmstadt
18:30 CET (UTC+01:00)	Wagner (yellow card) 25'; Gondorf (yellow card) 45'; Heller 47'; Niemeyer (yellow card) 52'; Garics (yellow card) 56'	Report	Lasogga 29' (pen.); Djourou (yellow card) 57'; Gregoritsch (yellow card) 85'	Stadium: Merck-Stadion am Böllenfalltor; Attendance: 17,000; Referee: Wolfgang Stark

20 November 2015 13	Hamburger SV	3–1	Borussia Dortmund	Hamburg
20:45 CET (UTC+01:00)	Lasogga 19' (pen.); Holtby 41'; Hummels 55' (o.g.)	Report	Bürki (yellow card) 19'; Aubameyang 86'	Stadium: Volksparkstadion; Attendance: 57,000; Referee: Felix Zwayer

28 November 2015 14	Werder Bremen	1–3	Hamburger SV	Bremen
15:30 CET (UTC+01:00)	Bartels (yellow card) 30'; Lukimya (yellow card) 54'; Ujah 62'	Report	Iličević 3'; Sakai (yellow card) 18'; Gregoritsch 26'; N. Müller 68'	Stadium: Weserstadion; Attendance: 42,100; Referee: Knut Kircher

5 December 2015 15	Hamburger SV	1–3	Mainz 05	Hamburg
15:30 CET (UTC+01:00)	Jung (yellow card) 44'; Djourou (yellow card) 84', (goal) 90'	Report	Jairo 16', 51'; Baumgartlinger (yellow card) 43'; Clemens 76'	Stadium: Volksparkstadion; Attendance: 51,698; Referee: Benjamin Brand

12 December 2015 16	VfL Wolfsburg	1–1	Hamburger SV	Wolfsburg
15:30 CET (UTC+01:00)	Draxler (yellow card) 71'; Arnold 78'	Report	Lasogga (yellow card) 16'; N. Müller 21'; Jung (yellow card) 58'; Ostrzolek (yellow card) 74'; Gregoritsch (yellow card) 82'	Stadium: Volkswagen Arena; Attendance: 30,000; Referee: Wolfgang Stark

19 December 2015 17	Hamburger SV	0–1	FC Augsburg	Hamburg
15:30 CET (UTC+01:00)		Report	Esswein (yellow card) 52'; Caiuby (yellow card) 56'; Morávek 76'	Stadium: Volksparkstadion; Attendance: 49,726; Referee: Bastian Dankert

22 January 2016 18	Hamburger SV	1–2	Bayern Munich	Hamburg
20:30 CET (UTC+01:00)	Ostrzolek (yellow card) 20'; Kačar (yellow card) 32'; Adler (yellow card) 36'; N. Müller (yellow card) 42'; Alonso 53' (o.g.)	Report	Lewandowski 37' (pen.), 61'; Lahm (yellow card) 45'; Alonso (yellow card) 82'	Stadium: Volksparkstadion; Attendance: 57,000; Referee: Felix Zwayer

30 January 2016 19	VfB Stuttgart	2–1	Hamburger SV	Stuttgart
18:30 CET (UTC+01:00)	Großkreutz (yellow card) 20'; Hunt 66' (o.g.); Kravets 88'	Report	Rudņevs 75'; Adler (yellow card) 79'; Hunt (yellow card) 84'; Ostrzolek (yellow card) 90+4'	Stadium: Mercedes-Benz Arena; Attendance: 46,600; Referee: Günter Perl

7 February 2016 20	Hamburger SV	1–1	1. FC Köln	Hamburg
15:30 CET (UTC+01:00)	Djourou (yellow card) 45'; N. Müller 47'; Kačar (yellow card) 56'; Holtby (yellow card) 58'; Spahić (yellow card) 65'; Schipplock (yellow card) 89'	Report	Zoller 41'; Mladenović (yellow card) 49'; Risse (yellow card) 71'	Stadium: Volksparkstadion; Attendance: 51,999; Referee: Felix Brych

14 February 2016 21	Hamburger SV	3–2	Borussia Mönchengladbach	Hamburg
15:30 CET (UTC+01:00)	Cléber (yellow card) 29'; Hinteregger 38' (o.g.); Rudņevs 41'; Iličević 80'; Drmić (yellow card) 84'; Jung (yellow card) 90+2'	Report	Johnson 14'; Nordtveit (yellow card) 51'; Raffael 88'	Stadium: Volksparkstadion; Attendance: 56,706; Referee: Deniz Aytekin

19 February 2016 22	Eintracht Frankfurt	0–0	Hamburger SV	Frankfurt
20:30 CET (UTC+01:00)	Zambrano (yellow card) 62'; Aigner (yellow card) 85'	Report	Djourou (yellow card) 21'; Drmić (yellow card) 38'; Lasogga (yellow card) 89'	Stadium: Commerzbank-Arena; Attendance: 47,200; Referee: Wolfgang Stark

27 February 2016 23	Hamburger SV	1–1	FC Ingolstadt	Hamburg
15:30 CET (UTC+01:00)	Drmić 7'; N. Müller (yellow card) 11'; Spahić (yellow card) 15'; Sakai (yellow card) 85'	Report	Hinterseer (yellow card) 37', (goal) 61'; Hübner (yellow card) 45+2'; Lezcano (yellow card) 47'; Cohen (yellow card) 67'; Bauer (yellow card) 85'	Stadium: Volksparkstadion; Attendance: 50,675; Referee: Marco Fritz

2 March 2016 24	Schalke 04	3–2	Hamburger SV	Gelsenkirchen
20:00 CET (UTC+01:00)	Meyer 37'; Neustädter (yellow card) 43'; Caiçara (yellow card) 60'; Huntelaar 66'; Schöpf 77'	Report	N. Müller 4'; Djourou (yellow card) 40' (yellow-red card) 45'; Kačar 90+1'	Stadium: Veltins-Arena; Attendance: 60,856; Referee: Günter Perl

6 March 2016 25	Hamburger SV	2–0	Hertha BSC	Hamburg
17:30 CET (UTC+01:00)	Rudņevs (yellow card) 18'; Spahić (yellow card) 55'; N. Müller 58', 75', (yellow card) 84'; Ekdal (yellow card) 60'	Report	Pekarík (yellow card) 38'	Stadium: Volksparkstadion; Attendance: 46,136; Referee: Felix Brych

13 March 2016 26	Bayer Leverkusen	1–0	Hamburger SV	Leverkusen
15:30 CET (UTC+01:00)	Ekdal 18' (o.g.); Frey (yellow card) 27'; Toprak (yellow card) 34'; Wendell (yellow card) 49'; Jedvaj (yellow card) 90+5' (yellow-red card) 90+6'; Kruse (yellow card) 90+7'	Report	Iličević (yellow card) 23'; N. Müller (yellow card) 31'	Stadium: BayArena; Attendance: 30,210; Referee: Christian Dingert

19 March 2016 27	Hamburger SV	1–3	TSG Hoffenheim	Hamburg
15:30 CET (UTC+01:00)	Adler (yellow card) 19'; Hunt 30' (pen.); Ostrzolek (yellow card) 35'; Holtby (yellow card) 70'	Report	Kramarić 20' (pen.); Volland 23'; Kadeřábek (yellow card) 49'; Vargas 67'	Stadium: Volksparkstadion; Attendance: 48,263; Referee: Knut Kircher

2 April 2016 28	Hannover 96	0–3	Hamburger SV	Hanover
15:30 CEST (UTC+02:00)	Szalai (yellow card) 58'	Report	Cléber 61'; Iličević (yellow card) 68', (goal) 73'; N. Müller 75'	Stadium: HDI-Arena; Attendance: 49,000; Referee: Robert Hartmann

9 April 2016 29	Hamburger SV	1–2	Darmstadt 98	Hamburg
15:30 CEST (UTC+02:00)	N. Müller (yellow card) 33'; Spahić (yellow card) 90'; Cléber (yellow card) 90+1'; Holtby 90+1'	Report	Jungwirth (yellow card) 26'; Sulu 38'; Caldirola (yellow card) 45+1'; Gondorf 54'	Stadium: Volksparkstadion; Attendance: 57,000; Referee: Peter Sippel

17 April 2016 30	Borussia Dortmund	3–0	Hamburger SV	Dortmund
15:30 CEST (UTC+02:00)	Pulisic 38'; Ramos 44', 86'	Report	Adler (red card) 52'	Stadium: Signal Iduna Park; Attendance: 81,359; Referee: Marco Fritz

22 April 2016 31	Hamburger SV	2–1	Werder Bremen	Hamburg
20:30 CEST (UTC+02:00)	Lasogga 5', 32', (yellow card) 26'; Gregoritsch (yellow card) 46'; Drobný (yellow card) 79'	Report	Yatabaré (yellow card) 15'; Fritz (yellow card) 35'; Ujah 65'; Djilobodji (yellow card) 76'; Bartels (yellow card) 90+5'	Stadium: Volksparkstadion; Attendance: 57,000; Referee: Manuel Gräfe

30 April 2016 32	Mainz 05	0–0	Hamburger SV	Mainz
15:30 CEST (UTC+02:00)		Report	Spahić (yellow card) 22'; Bahoui (yellow card) 61'; Kačar (yellow card) 63'	Stadium: Coface Arena; Attendance: 34,000; Referee: Guido Winkmann

7 May 2016 33	Hamburger SV	0–1	VfL Wolfsburg	Hamburg
15:30 CEST (UTC+02:00)		Report	Luiz Gustavo 73'	Stadium: Volksparkstadion; Attendance: 57,000; Referee: Benjamin Brand

14 May 2016 34	FC Augsburg	1–3	Hamburger SV	Augsburg
15:30 CEST (UTC+02:00)	Finnbogason 11', (yellow card) 52'; Janker (yellow card) 35'; Kohr (yellow card) 50'	Report	Gregoritsch (yellow card) 33', (goal) 36', 74'; N. Müller 62'; Holtby (yellow card) 64'; Altıntaş (yellow card) 66'	Stadium: WWK ARENA; Attendance: 30,660; Referee: Florian Meyer

=== DFB-Pokal ===
9 August 2015 Round 1	Carl Zeiss Jena	3–2 (a.e.t.)	Hamburger SV	Jena
14:30 CEST (UTC+02:00)	Gerlach 15'; Krstić (yellow card) 30'; Bär (yellow card) 39'; Koczor (yellow card) 49'; Jovanović 58'; Pieles 106'; Wolfram (yellow card) 108'	Report	Spahić (yellow card) 14'; Olić 49'; Holtby (yellow card) 58'; Gregoritsch 90+4'	Stadium: Ernst-Abbe-Sportfeld; Attendance: 13,800; Referee: Frank Willenborg

== Statistics ==
=== Appearances and goals ===
As of 14 May 2016

No.	Pos	Nat	Player	Total		Bundesliga		DFB-Pokal	
No.	Pos	Nat	Player	Apps	Goals	Apps	Goals	Apps	Goals
1	GK	(Czech Republic) CZE	Jaroslav Drobny	10	0	10	0	0	0
15	GK	(Germany) GER	René Adler	25	0	24	0	1	0
30	GK	(Switzerland) SUI	Andreas Hirzel	1	0	1	0	0	0
36	GK	(Germany) GER	Tom Mickel	1	0	1	0	0	0
2	DF	(Germany) GER	Dennis Diekmeier	22	0	22	0	0	0
3	DF	(Brazil) BRA	Cléber	24	1	23	1	1	0
4	DF	(Bosnia and Herzegovina) BIH	Emir Spahic	27	0	26	0	1	0
5	DF	(Switzerland) SUI	Johan Djourou	26	2	26	2	0	0
22	DF	(Germany) GER	Matthias Ostrzolek	33	0	32	0	1	0
24	DF	(Japan) JPN	Gōtoku Sakai	23	0	22	0	1	0
28	DF	(Germany) GER	Gideon Jung	20	0	19	0	1	0
7	MF	(Croatia) CRO	Ivo Iličević	32	4	31	4	1	0
8	MF	(Germany) GER	Lewis Holtby	35	3	34	3	1	0
14	MF	(Germany) GER	Aaron Hunt	21	2	21	2	0	0
17	MF	(Hungary) HUN	Zoltán Stieber	2	0	2	0	0	0
20	MF	(Sweden) SWE	Albin Ekdal	15	0	14	0	1	0
21	MF	(Chile) CHI	Marcelo Díaz	12	0	11	0	1	0
21	MF	(Sweden) SWE	Nabil Bahoui	6	0	6	0	0	0
27	MF	(Germany) GER	Nicolai Müller	29	9	29	9	0	0
40	MF	(Serbia) SRB	Gojko Kačar	19	1	19	1	0	0
33	FW	(Germany) GER	Sven Schipplock	21	0	20	0	1	0
35	FW	(Germany) GER	Pierre-Michel Lasogga	31	8	30	8	1	0
11	FW	(Croatia) CRO	Ivica Olić	10	1	9	0	1	1
17	FW	(Latvia) LAT	Artjoms Rudņevs	11	2	11	2	0	0
18	FW	(Switzerland) SUI	Josip Drmić	6	1	6	1	0	0
20	FW	(Austria) AUT	Michael Gregoritsch	26	6	25	5	1	1
44	FW	(Turkey) TUR	Batuhan Altıntaş	1	0	1	0	0	0
