= Emiliano Insúa =

Argentine footballer (born 1989)

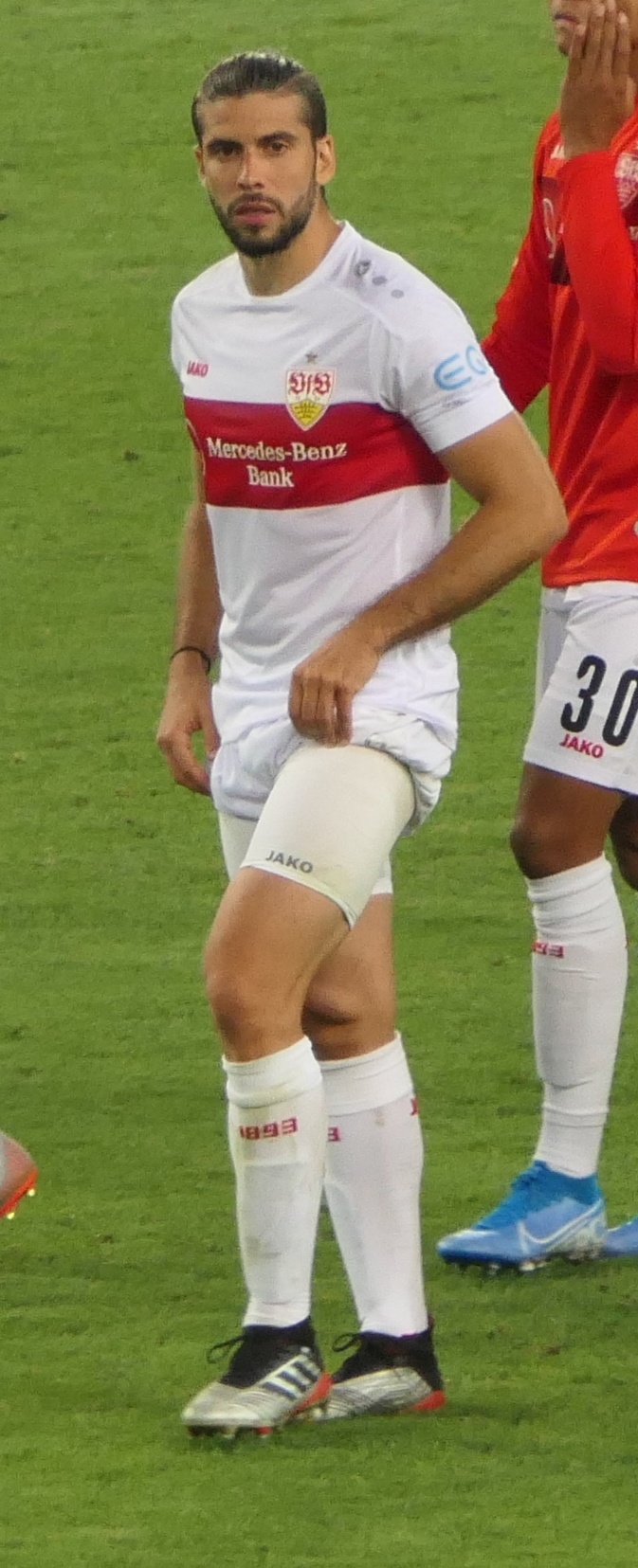
- Insúa playing for VfB Stuttgart in 2019

Personal information
- Full name: Emiliano Adrián Insúa Zapata
- Date of birth: 7 January 1989 (age 37)
- Place of birth: Buenos Aires, Argentina
- Height: 1.79 m (5 ft 10 in)
- Position: Left-back

Youth career
- Boca Juniors

Senior career*
| Years | Team | Apps | (Gls) |
| 2007 | Boca Juniors | 0 | (0) |
| 2007 | → Liverpool (loan) | 2 | (0) |
| 2007–2011 | Liverpool | 44 | (0) |
| 2010–2011 | → Galatasaray (loan) | 16 | (0) |
| 2011–2013 | Sporting CP | 37 | (1) |
| 2013–2015 | Atlético Madrid | 9 | (0) |
| 2014–2015 | → Rayo Vallecano (loan) | 24 | (1) |
| 2015–2020 | VfB Stuttgart | 125 | (3) |
| 2020–2021 | LA Galaxy | 22 | (0) |
| 2021 | Aldosivi | 26 | (0) |
| 2022–2023 | Racing Club | 46 | (0) |

International career
| 2006–2009 | Argentina U20 | 19 | (0) |
| 2008 | Argentina U23 | 1 | (0) |
| 2009–2017 | Argentina | 5 | (0) |
Medal record
Men's football
Representing Argentina
FIFA U-20 World Cup
| Winner | 2007 Canada | U-20 Team |
- * Club domestic league appearances and goals

Emiliano Adrián Insúa Zapata (born 7 January 1989) is an Argentine former professional footballer who played as a left-back.

== Club career ==
=== Early career ===
Insúa began his football career with youth team Pinocho in Villa Urquiza, Argentina, later moving to, Buenos Aires-based team, Boca Juniors. The left back did not break into the first-team at La Bombonera when he caught the attention of scouts Frank McParland and Paddy Murphy from Liverpool. After some solid performances for the Argentinian U17s, many clubs were desperate to sign him, a player who rarely had appearances for his then club, and Boca were also very keen to get a profit from this young prodigy which led to negotiations between Liverpool and Boca. The defender agreed to an 18-month loan deal with the Merseyside club on 28 November 2006, beginning his loan period in January.

=== Liverpool ===
Insúa made his first-team debut against Portsmouth on 28 April 2007, but made only one more league appearance that season. His loan deal was made permanent in August 2007 in the deal which saw Gabriel Paletta move to Boca Juniors.

The following season Insúa made only three more first-team league appearances but found success with Gary Ablett's Premier Reserve League winning team; along with other Liverpool youngsters. His performances impressed manager Rafael Benítez enough to offer him a new three-year deal at the club. In December 2008 Insua got a run of games in the Liverpool first team, due to an injury to Fábio Aurélio and also due to the form of Andrea Dossena. Insúa found himself starting in Liverpool's opening six Premier League games and the first tie of their UEFA Champions League campaign. He scored his first goal for the club in a 2–1 defeat against Arsenal in the League Cup at the Emirates Stadium on 28 October 2009.

In July 2010, despite being Liverpool's only senior left back available, a fee was agreed for him to join Fiorentina, although a contract was never signed.

==== Loan to Galatasaray ====
On 31 August 2010, he joined Galatasaray on a one-year loan deal with an option to transfer permanently next year on 30 June, when the deal expired. He wore the number 6 shirt. It was rumoured that Insúa would be returning to Liverpool in the January transfer window after Galatasaray manager Gheorghe Hagi stated that he did not want loan players in his squad and Insúa had reportedly expressed his desire to play for Liverpool under new manager Kenny Dalglish.

==== Return to Liverpool ====
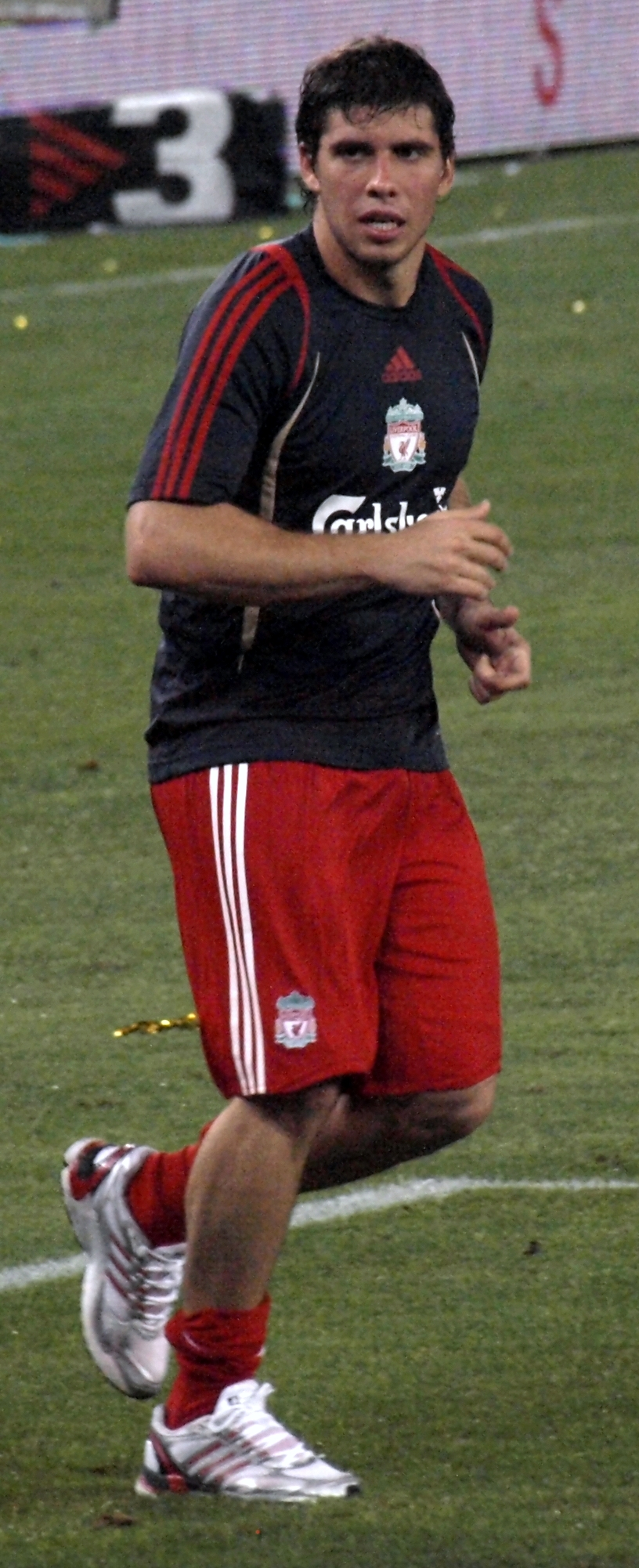
Insúa warming up for Liverpool in 2009

Insúa returned to Liverpool for pre-season training following his loan spell. After being denied entry into China for passport reasons, Insua rejoined the Liverpool squad in Malaysia. He featured in Liverpool's 6–3 win over a Malaysian select team, coming on as a second-half substitute and scoring a goal.

=== Sporting CP ===
On 27 August 2011, Sporting CP announced that Insúa had signed for the club in a five-year deal for an undisclosed fee. He was given the number 48.

Insúa made his debut for Sporting on 15 September 2011 in the UEFA Europa League, scoring the first goal in a 2–0 victory over FC Zürich. On 29 September 2011, Insúa scored the second goal in a 2–1 victory against Lazio, again in the Europa League. He was sent off later in the match after earning a second yellow card.

=== Atlético Madrid ===
On 25 January 2013, Atlético Madrid announced that they have reached an agreement with Sporting CP for the transfer of Insúa, reportedly for €3.5 million.

==== Loan to Rayo Vallecano ====
On 1 September 2014 Insúa was loaned to fellow league team Rayo Vallecano, in a season-long deal.

=== VfB Stuttgart ===
On 11 July 2015, Insúa mutually terminated his contract with Atlético and signed with VfB Stuttgart until 2018. Insúa extended his contract with Stuttgart on 14 May 2018 until June 2020.

=== LA Galaxy ===
On 2 January 2020, Insúa signed with MLS side LA Galaxy.

=== Aldosivi ===
On 14 February 2021, Insúa agreed his return to Argentina after nearly 14 years abroad, joining Aldosivi in the Primera División on a free transfer and a deal running until December. Two days later, he was joined by his brother Emanuel, becoming teammates for the first time in their professional careers.

== International career ==
The player succeeded on the Under-20s international scene, playing three games to finish with the runner-up medal at the 2007 South American Youth Championship, which served as a qualifier for the FIFA U20 World Cup where he played seven games, conceding just 4 goals in the entire tournament and aiding the Argentina Under-20 team to victory against the Czech Republic in the FIFA U20 World Cup final on 22 July 2007.

On 24 August 2009, Liverpool manager Rafael Benítez said that Diego Maradona was monitoring the progress of Insúa and considering calling him up for international duty with Argentina. Maradona eventually did call him up on 26 September 2009, for the crucial World Cup qualifiers against Peru and Uruguay, making his first start in a 2–1 win over Peru.

== Personal life ==
Insúa is a citizen of the European Union through one of his grandparents, who is Spanish.

His younger brother, Emanuel, is also a footballer and left back.

== Career statistics ==
=== Club ===
As of match played 5 November 2020

Appearances and goals by club, season and competition
| Club | Season | League | | | National cup | | League cup | | Other | | Total | |
| Club | Season | Division | Apps | Goals | Apps | Goals | Apps | Goals | Apps | Goals | Apps | Goals |
|---|---|---|---|---|---|---|---|---|---|---|---|---|
| Liverpool | 2006–07 | Premier League | 2 | 0 | 0 | 0 | 0 | 0 | 0 | 0 | 2 | 0 |
| Liverpool | 2007–08 | Premier League | 3 | 0 | 0 | 0 | 0 | 0 | 0 | 0 | 3 | 0 |
| Liverpool | 2008–09 | Premier League | 10 | 0 | 1 | 0 | 2 | 0 | 0 | 0 | 13 | 0 |
| Liverpool | 2009–10 | Premier League | 31 | 0 | 2 | 0 | 1 | 1 | 10 (Note: Six appearances in UEFA Champions League, four in UEFA Europa League) | 0 | 44 | 1 |
| Liverpool | Total | | 46 | 0 | 3 | 0 | 3 | 1 | 10 | 0 | 62 | 1 |
| Galatasaray (loan) | 2010–11 | Süper Lig | 16 | 0 | 3 | 0 | — | | — | | 19 | 0 |
| Sporting CP | 2011–12 | Primeira Liga | 24 | 0 | 7 | 2 | 2 | 0 | 12 (Note: Appearances in UEFA Europa League) | 4 | 45 | 6 |
| Sporting CP | 2012–13 | Primeira Liga | 13 | 0 | 1 | 0 | 2 | 0 | 5 | 0 | 21 | 0 |
| Sporting CP | Total | | 37 | 0 | 8 | 2 | 4 | 0 | 17 | 4 | 66 | 6 |
| Atlético Madrid | 2012–13 | La Liga | 3 | 0 | 0 | 0 | — | | 0 | 0 | 3 | 0 |
| Atlético Madrid | 2013–14 | La Liga | 6 | 0 | 4 | 0 | — | | 4 (Note: Appearances in UEFA Champions League) | 0 | 14 | 0 |
| Atlético Madrid | Total | | 9 | 0 | 4 | 0 | 0 | 0 | 4 | 0 | 17 | 0 |
| Rayo Vallecano (loan) | 2014–15 | La Liga | 24 | 1 | 0 | 0 | — | | — | | 24 | 1 |
| VfB Stuttgart | 2015–16 | Bundesliga | 33 | 0 | 4 | 0 | — | | — | | 37 | 0 |
| VfB Stuttgart | 2016–17 | 2. Bundesliga | 34 | 1 | 2 | 0 | — | | — | | 36 | 1 |
| VfB Stuttgart | 2017–18 | Bundesliga | 25 | 0 | 2 | 0 | — | | — | | 27 | 0 |
| VfB Stuttgart | 2018–19 | Bundesliga | 27 | 2 | 1 | 0 | 1 | 0 | — | | 29 | 2 |
| VfB Stuttgart | 2019–20 | 2. Bundesliga | 6 | 0 | 0 | 0 | — | | — | | 6 | 0 |
| VfB Stuttgart | Total | | 125 | 3 | 9 | 0 | 1 | 0 | 0 | 0 | 135 | 3 |
| LA Galaxy | 2020 | Major League Soccer | 22 | 0 | 0 | 0 | 0 | 0 | — | | 22 | 0 |
| Aldosivi | 2021 | Primera División | 0 | 0 | 0 | 0 | 0 | 0 | — | | 0 | 0 |
| Career total | | | 279 | 4 | 27 | 2 | 8 | 1 | 31 | 4 | 345 | 11 |

=== International ===
Appearances and goals by national team and year
| National team | Year | Apps | Goals |
|---|---|---|---|
| Argentina | 2009 | 1 | 0 |
| Argentina | 2010 | 1 | 0 |
| Argentina | 2011 | 2 | 0 |
| Argentina | 2017 | 1 | 0 |
| Total | | 5 | 0 |

== Honours ==
Liverpool

- Premier Reserve League: 2008

Atlético Madrid

- La Liga: 2013–14
- Copa del Rey: 2012–13
- Supercopa de España: 2014
- UEFA Champions League: runner-up 2013–14

VfB Stuttgart

- 2. Bundesliga: 2016–17

Racing Club

- Trofeo de Campeones de la Liga Profesional: 2022

Argentina

- FIFA U-20 World Cup: 2007
