= Torrox =

- Municipality
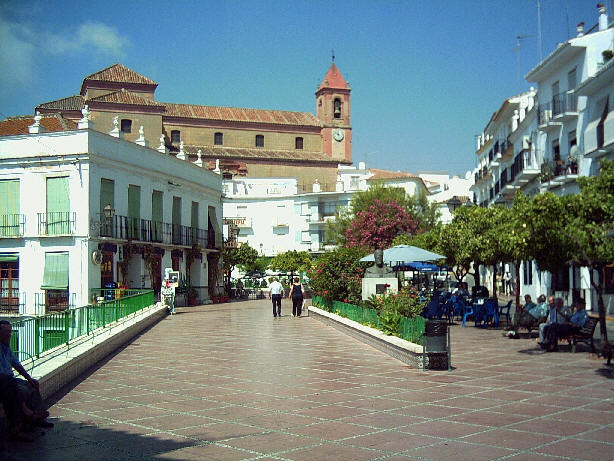
- Plaza de la Constitucion

- Flag Coat of arms

- Location in Spain Torrox (Andalusia) Torrox (Spain)
- Coordinates: 36°45′N 3°57′W
- Sovereign state: Spain
- Autonomous community: Andalusia
- Province: Málaga
- Comarca: La Axarquía

Government
  - Mayor: Antonia Claros Atencia

Area
  - Total: 51 km^{2} (20 sq mi)
- Elevation: 120 m (390 ft)

Population (2025-01-01)
  - Total: 22.523
  - Density: 0.44/km^{2} (1.1/sq mi)
- Demonym: Torroxeños
- Time zone: UTC+1 (CET)
  - Summer (DST): UTC+2 (CEST)
- Website: Official website

Torrox is a municipality in the province of Málaga in the autonomous community of Andalusia, southern Spain. It belongs to the comarca of Axarquía. It is located in the Costa del Sol (specifically the Costa del Sol Oriental), on the shores of the Mediterranean Sea and the foothills of the Sierra de Almijara. The municipality is divided into two distinct areas: Torrox Pueblo (the historic inland village) and Torrox Costa (the modern coastal resort area).

== Climate ==
Torrox has an average annual temperature of 18 degrees."

== Notable people ==
- Almanzor, Former Chancellor of the Umayyad Caliphate of Córdoba
- Raúl Baena, footballer

== Twin towns ==
- Kirkel, Germany
- Mauléon, France

== See also ==
- List of municipalities in Málaga
