= Raúl Baena =

Spanish footballer (born 1989)

Personal information
- Full name: José Raúl Baena Urdiales
- Date of birth: 2 March 1989 (age 37)
- Place of birth: Torrox, Spain
- Height: 1.81 m (5 ft 11 in)
- Position: Defensive midfielder

Youth career
- 1994–1999: Faro Torrox
- 1999–2003: Málaga
- 2003–2007: Barcelona

Senior career*
| Years | Team | Apps | (Gls) |
| 2007–2010 | Espanyol B | 38 | (3) |
| 2009–2013 | Espanyol | 85 | (2) |
| 2013–2017 | Rayo Vallecano | 91 | (4) |
| 2017–2019 | Granada | 23 | (0) |
| 2018–2019 | → Melbourne Victory (loan) | 21 | (1) |
| 2019–2020 | Atromitos | 17 | (0) |
| 2020–2022 | Kitchee | 18 | (3) |
| 2023–2024 | Sabadell | 19 | (0) |
| Total | | 312 | (13) |

International career
| 2006 | Spain U17 | 4 | (0) |
| 2011 | Spain U21 | 1 | (0) |
- * Club domestic league appearances and goals

José Raúl Baena Urdiales (Spanish pronunciation: [xoˈse raˈul βaˈenawɾˈðjales]; (Note: In isolation, Baena is pronounced [baˈena].) born 2 March 1989) is a Spanish former professional footballer who played as a defensive midfielder.

== Club career ==
=== Espanyol ===
Born in Torrox, Province of Málaga, Andalusia, and after starting his footballing career at local Málaga CF and later coming through the FC Barcelona's youth ranks, Baena switched to Catalonia neighbours RCD Espanyol in 2007, at the age of 18. He made his debut with its first team on 4 October 2009 in a La Liga match against Villarreal CF, playing the second half as the ten-man side eventually held off the hosts to a 0–0 draw.

Baena quickly became an integral part of the main squad, alternating starts with appearances from the bench in his debut season. On 12 December 2009, his penalty offense on FC Barcelona's Xavi supposed the game's only goal, in a derby defeat.

Baena was regularly used by manager Mauricio Pochettino in the following campaigns, often partnering another club youth graduate, Javi Márquez, in central midfield. On 21 January 2012 he scored his first goal in the top flight, opening the score in a 3–0 home victory over Granada CF.

=== Rayo Vallecano ===
On 26 June 2013, Baena signed a two-year contract with Rayo Vallecano. In 2014–15 he scored twice in 28 matches to help his team to finish 11th in the top tier and, at its closure, agreed to a two-year extension.

=== Granada ===
Baena joined Granada of the Segunda División in the summer of 2017, agreeing to a three-year deal. During his only season at the Nuevo Estadio de Los Cármenes, he acted as team captain.

In September 2018, Baena signed for Melbourne Victory FC on a one-year loan. He scored his only goal in the A-League on 1 December in a 4–0 home defeat of Western Sydney Wanderers FC, and left the following May.

=== Kitchee ===
Baena joined Hong Kong Premier League club Kitchee SC on 10 December 2020, after one year with Atromitos F.C. in the Super League Greece. On 1 May 2022, in the last group fixture of the AFC Champions League, he scored in injury time of the 2–2 home draw with Vissel Kobe, sending his team through to the knockout stage at the expense of Melbourne City FC.

=== Later career ===
In February 2023, aged 34, Baena returned to Spain after five years away, with CE Sabadell FC of the Primera Federación.

== International career ==
Baena won his only cap for the Spain under-21 side on 28 March 2011 as a member of Espanyol, coming on as a 70th-minute substitute for Athletic Bilbao's Ander Herrera in the 1–1 friendly draw with Belarus held in Alcalá de Henares.

== Career statistics ==
As of 28 May 2023

Appearances and goals by club, season and competition
| Club | Season | League | | | Cup | | Continental | | Other | | Total | |
| Club | Season | Division | Apps | Goals | Apps | Goals | Apps | Goals | Apps | Goals | Apps | Goals |
|---|---|---|---|---|---|---|---|---|---|---|---|---|
| Espanyol B | 2009–10 | Segunda División B | 7 | 2 | 0 | 0 | 0 | 0 | 0 | 0 | 7 | 2 |
| Espanyol | 2009–10 | La Liga | 19 | 0 | 1 | 0 | — | | — | | 20 | 0 |
| Espanyol | 2010–11 | La Liga | 15 | 0 | 3 | 0 | — | | — | | 18 | 0 |
| Espanyol | 2011–12 | La Liga | 32 | 1 | 3 | 0 | — | | — | | 35 | 1 |
| Espanyol | 2012–13 | La Liga | 19 | 1 | 1 | 0 | — | | — | | 20 | 1 |
| Espanyol | Total | | 85 | 2 | 8 | 0 | — | | — | | 93 | 2 |
| Rayo Vallecano | 2013–14 | La Liga | 20 | 0 | 3 | 0 | — | | — | | 23 | 0 |
| Rayo Vallecano | 2014–15 | La Liga | 28 | 2 | 2 | 0 | — | | — | | 30 | 2 |
| Rayo Vallecano | 2015–16 | La Liga | 24 | 1 | 2 | 0 | — | | — | | 26 | 1 |
| Rayo Vallecano | 2016–17 | Segunda División | 19 | 1 | 0 | 0 | — | | — | | 19 | 1 |
| Rayo Vallecano | Total | | 91 | 4 | 7 | 0 | — | | — | | 98 | 4 |
| Granada | 2017–18 | Segunda División | 23 | 0 | 0 | 0 | — | | — | | 23 | 0 |
| Melbourne Victory (loan) | 2018–19 | A-League | 21 | 1 | 0 | 0 | 3 | 0 | — | | 24 | 1 |
| Atromitos | 2019–20 | Super League Greece | 17 | 0 | 2 | 0 | — | | — | | 19 | 0 |
| Kitchee | 2020–21 | Hong Kong Premier League | 13 | 1 | 0 | 0 | 6 | 0 | 2 (Note: Appearances in Sapling Cup) | 0 | 21 | 1 |
| Kitchee | 2021–22 | Hong Kong Premier League | 3 | 2 | 2 | 0 | 4 | 1 | 8 | 0 | 17 | 2 |
| Kitchee | 2022–23 | Hong Kong Premier League | 2 | 0 | 0 | 0 | — | | 2 (Note: One appearance in Sapling Cup, one appearance in Hong Kong Senior Challenge Shield) | 0 | 4 | 0 |
| Kitchee | Total | | 18 | 3 | 2 | 0 | 10 | 0 | 12 | 0 | 42 | 3 |
| Sabadell | 2022–23 | Primera Federación | 12 | 0 | 0 | 0 | — | | — | | 12 | 0 |
| Career total | | | 274 | 12 | 19 | 0 | 13 | 0 | 12 | 0 | 318 | 12 |
