= Lewis Holtby =

German footballer (born 1990)

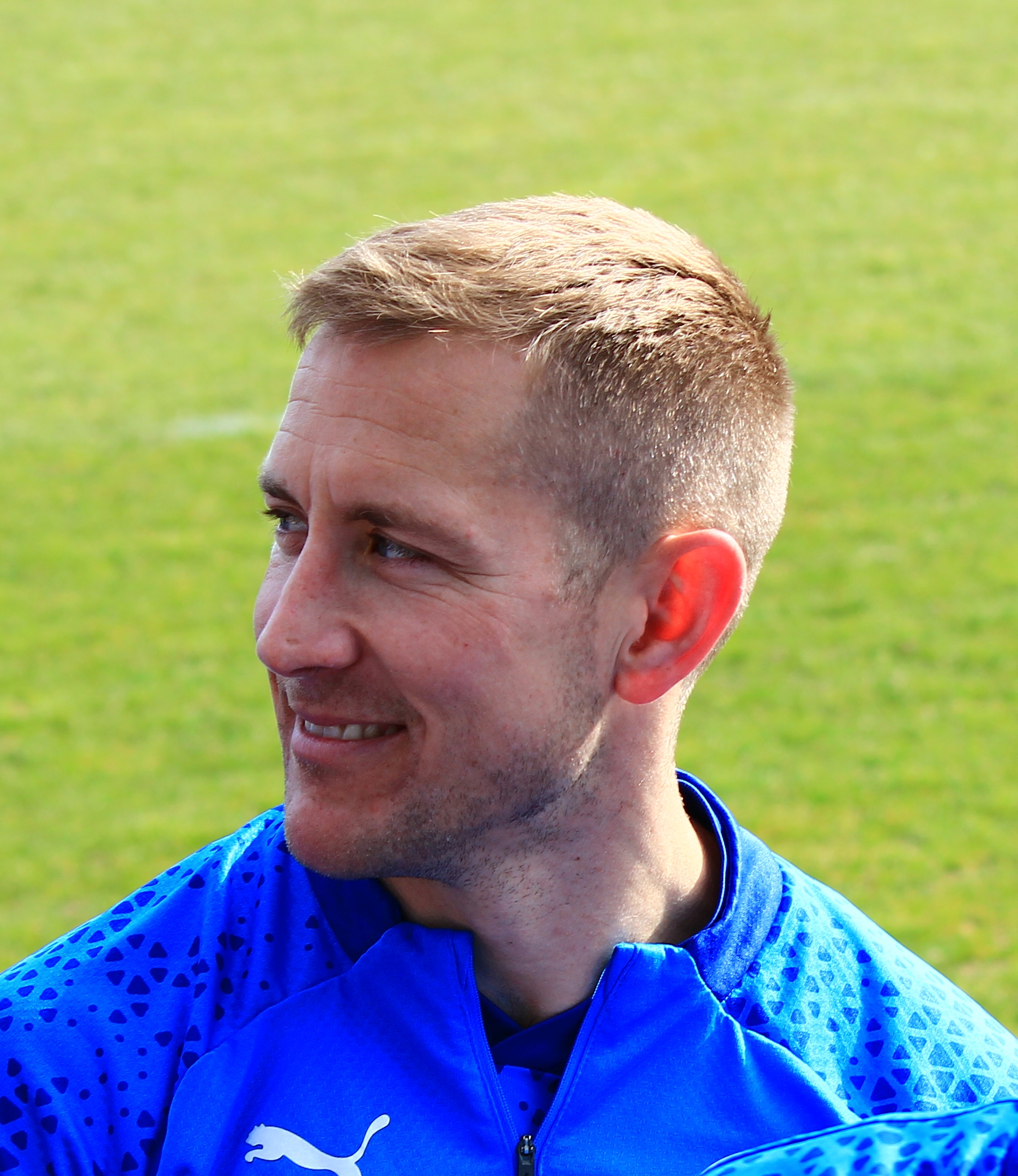
- Holtby with Holstein Kiel in 2025

Personal information
- Full name: Lewis Harry Holtby
- Date of birth: 18 September 1990 (age 36)
- Place of birth: Erkelenz, West Germany
- Height: 1.76 m (5 ft 9 in)
- Position: Midfielder

Youth career
- 1994–2001: Sparta Gerderath
- 2001–2004: Borussia Mönchengladbach
- 2004–2007: Alemannia Aachen

Senior career*
Years	Team	Apps	(Gls)
2007–2009	Alemannia Aachen	33	(8)
2009–2013	Schalke 04	55	(10)
2010	→ VfL Bochum (loan)	14	(2)
2010–2011	→ Mainz 05 (loan)	30	(4)
2013–2015	Tottenham Hotspur	25	(1)
2014	→ Fulham (loan)	13	(1)
2014–2015	→ Hamburger SV (loan)	22	(0)
2015–2019	Hamburger SV	105	(14)
2019–2021	Blackburn Rovers	54	(3)
2021–2025	Holstein Kiel	103	(7)
2025–2026	NAC Breda	30	(1)
Total		484	(51)

International career
2008	Germany U18	2	(0)
2008–2009	Germany U19	12	(4)
2009–2010	Germany U20	6	(2)
2009–2013	Germany U21	24	(14)
2010–2012	Germany	3	(0)
- * Club domestic league appearances and goals

Lewis Harry Holtby (born 18 September 1990) is a German former professional footballer who played as a midfielder.

Holtby began his professional career with Alemannia Aachen before signing for Schalke 04 two years later. He was subsequently loaned to VfL Bochum and Mainz 05 before returning to Schalke where he lifted the DFL-Supercup in 2011. He then spent two seasons in England with Premier League sides Tottenham and Fulham between 2013 and 2014 before returning to Germany to sign for Hamburger SV. There, he spent five seasons, including the 2017–18 Bundesliga campaign in which the club was relegated for the first time in history, and made over 100 appearances before spending two seasons with EFL Championship side Blackburn Rovers between 2019 and 2021. He retired in summer 2026.

Holtby also represented Germany at various youth levels from 2008 to 2013 and captained the nation at the 2013 UEFA European Under-21 Championship. He made his senior debut against Sweden in 2010 and has since won 3 caps for the national side.

== Club career ==
=== Early career ===
Lewis Harry Holtby was born on 18 September 1990 in Erkelenz, West Germany. He began playing football at the age of four with amateur side Sparta Gerderath, a club with whom his father had also previously played, before signing for Borussia Mönchengladbach when he was 11-years old. He spent three seasons in Gladbach's academy before the club let him go in 2004, deeming him to be too small and slow to make it as a professional footballer. Following his release, Holtby elected to sign for Alemannia Aachen in the second tier of German football at the age of 14.

=== Aachen ===
After three years in Aachen's academy, Holtby signed a professional contract with the club during the 2007–08 season. He was then handed his first-team debut at the age of 17 by caretaker manager Jörg Schmadtke in December 2007, coming on as a second half substitute for Mirko Casper in a 2–2 draw with FC St. Pauli. His debut was one of only two appearances for the season, with his second coming in a 3–1 loss to TuS Koblenz on the last match day of the campaign. The following season, Holtby was converted to the left wing position by new club manager Jürgen Seeberger. Excelling in his new role, he scored his first goal for the club on 8 December 2008 against 1860 Munich before netting a brace in a 6–2 drubbing of Nürnberg in February the following year. He ultimately made 31 appearances for the season and scored eight goals as Aachen ended the campaign in fourth place, narrowly missing out on a spot in the promotion playoffs. Holtby's form for the season saw him awarded the Gold Fritz Walter Medal for the best German U19 player in 2009, ahead of runners-up Konstantin Rausch and André Schürrle.

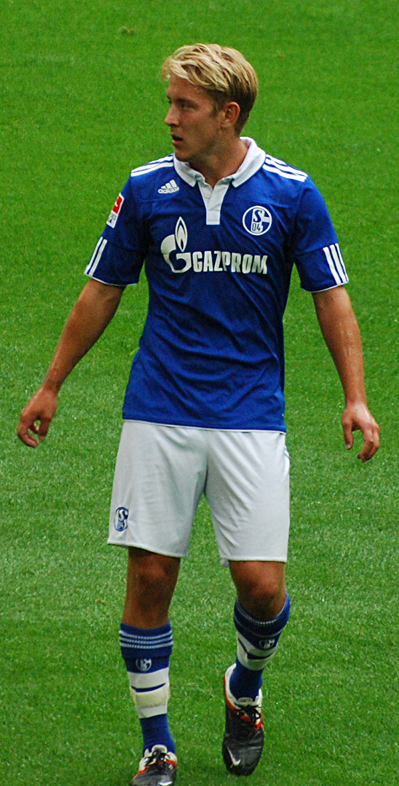
Holtby playing for Schalke 04 in 2011

=== Schalke 04 ===
Having impressed in the second division with Aachen, Holtby was courted by a number of Bundesliga sides ahead of the 2009–10 season. Schalke emerged as the successful suitors and in July 2008 signed him on a four-year deal for a reported fee of €2.5 million. He was handed his debut for the club on 1 August 2009 by manager Felix Magath, with whom he would later fall out with, in a 4–0 DFB Pokal win over Germania Windeck. He featured nine times in the league, during which he registered two assists, and twice in the cup before being loaned to fellow Bundesliga side Bochum in January for the remainder of the season.

==== Loan spells with Bochum and Mainz ====
Holtby joined Bochum at the end of January 2010, initially on an 18-month long loan deal. He made his debut for the club on 6 February in a 1–1 Bundesliga draw with Bayer Leverkusen in which he registered the assist for Zlatko Dedic's second-half equalizer. On 13 March, he scored his first goal for the club, and his first in the Bundesliga, in a 4–1 defeat at the hands of Dortmund. He made 14 appearances in total for Bochum and scored twice before his loan was cut short at the end of the season following the club's relegation.

Upon his return to Schalke, Holtby was once again loaned out for the 2010–11 season, this time to Mainz. Under the management of Thomas Tuchel at Mainz, Holtby formed a strong partnership with attackers Ádám Szalai and André Schürrle which helped the club to seven successive wins at the start of the season. His impressive form for the club caught the eye of national team coach Joachim Löw who selected him for the senior Germany squad in November 2010. He ultimately made 32 appearances for the season across all competitions and scored 6 goals as Mainz ended the season in fifth place, 18 points ahead of Schalke, and qualified for a spot in the UEFA Europa League for the next season. Upon the expiration of his loan at Mainz, Holtby paid tribute to Tuchel, describing him as a brilliant coach who had made him a much better player.

==== Return to Schalke ====
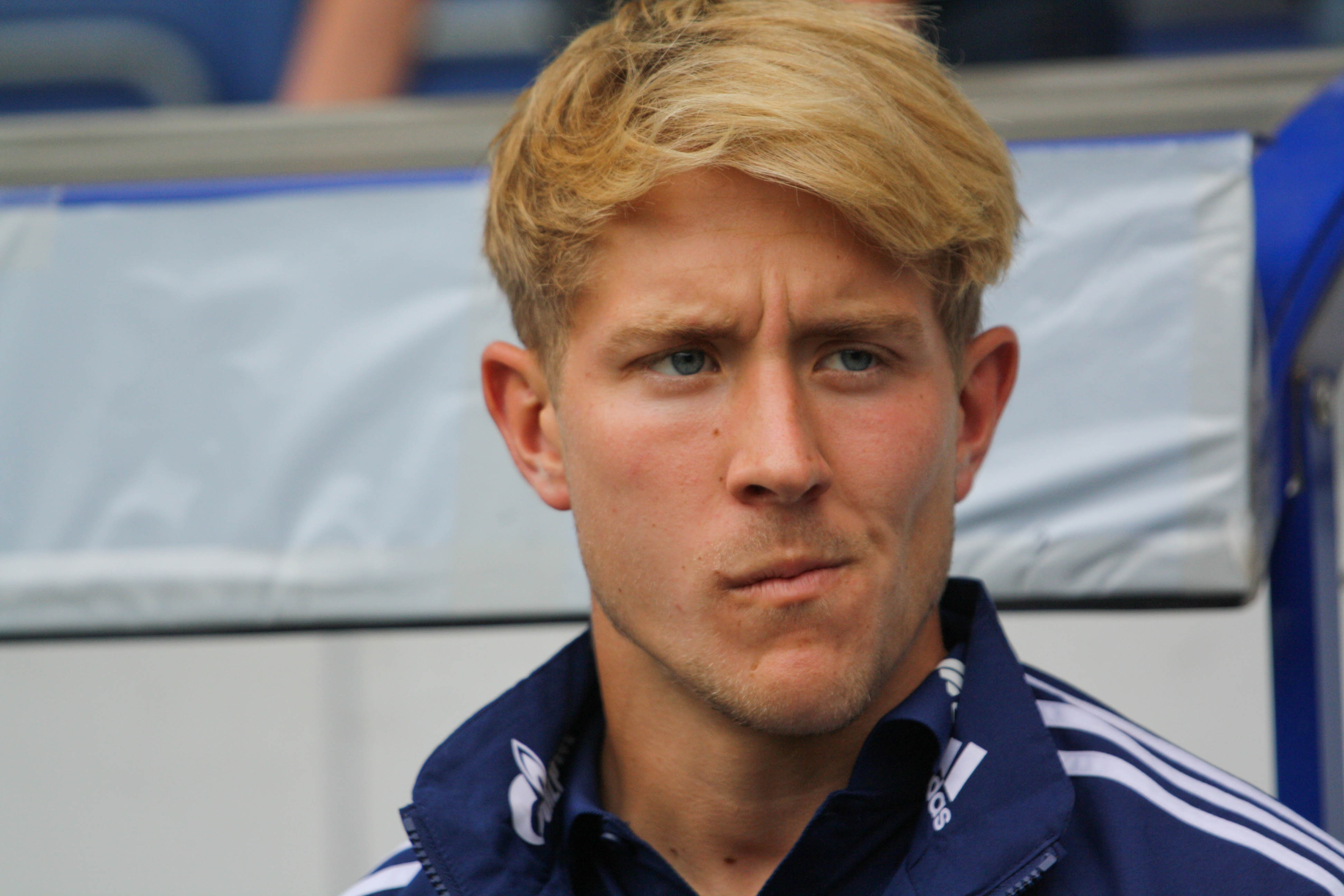
Holtby scored 13 goals in 79 appearances for Schalke across all competitions.

Following his return to Schalke, Holtby was named in the starting line-up for the 2011 Supercup on 23 July and scored the first penalty in a penalty shoot-out victory over Dortmund. He scored his first goal for the club the following month, netting Schalke's third in a 5–1 league win over Köln. Having previously played as an attacking fielder and winger, Holtby was converted to a deeper role under new manager Ralf Rangnick due to Spanish legend Raúl occupying the more advanced attacking position in the team. In spite of his more defensive role, Holtby managed to record a career best tally of nine goals for the season across 41 appearances, helping Schalke finish the campaign in fifth position in the league and as semi-finalists in the Champions League.

At the start of the following season, Holtby said that he would not be extending his contract with the club which was set to expire at the end of the campaign. During the January transfer window, Premier League side Tottenham announced that they had signed Holtby on a pre-contract, with the player to join the club in July 2013. On 18 January, during his first match following the announcement, he scored what proved to be the winning goal for Schalke in a 5–4 defeat of Hannover 96. He played only one more match for the club, however, as Tottenham reached an agreement with Schalke to fast-track Holtby's transfer to January following a serious injury to Sandro.

=== Tottenham Hotspur ===
On 28 January 2013, Holtby signed a four-and-a-half-year contract to complete a £1.5 million move to Tottenham Hotspur. He made his Spurs debut two days later, coming off the bench in the 71st minute to replace Clint Dempsey in a 1–1 draw with Norwich City away at Carrow Road. His home debut followed on 9 February in a 2–1 victory against Newcastle United. He made a total of 11 appearances as Tottenham ended the campaign in fifth place, ultimately missing out on a Champions League place by one point. Holtby scored his first Tottenham goal during the club's opening match of the following season on 29 August 2013, finding the back of the net from 25 yards (23 m) in a 3–0 Europa League play-off round win over Dinamo Tbilisi. He then scored his first Premier League goal for the club on 4 December, netting the winner in a 2–1 triumph over Fulham at Craven Cottage. The goal proved to be his first and final goal for Tottenham in the league as the following month, after struggling to break into the first team under manager Tim Sherwood, he signed for Fulham on loan for the remainder of the season.

==== Loan to Fulham ====
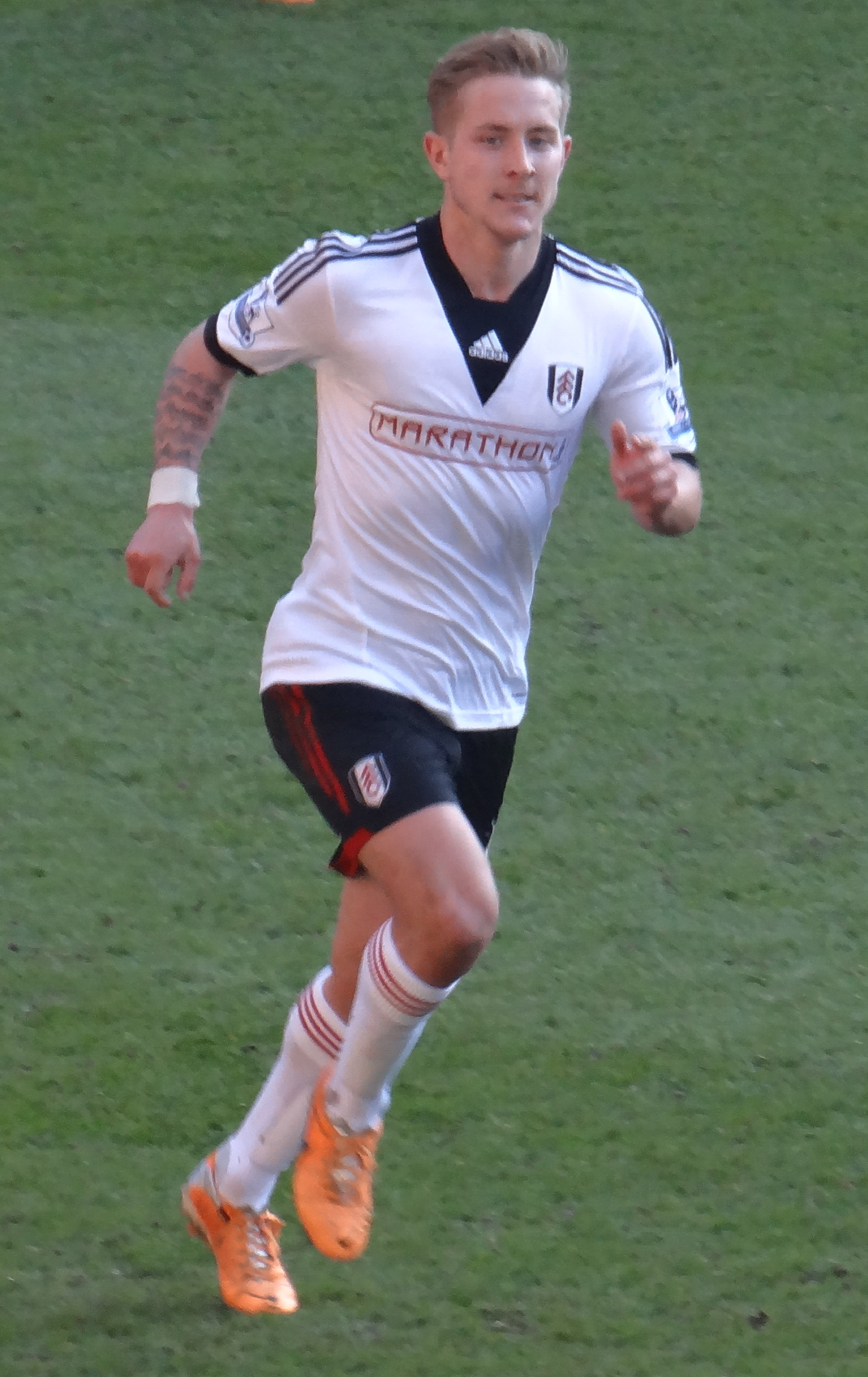
Holtby playing for Fulham in 2014

Fulham completed the loan signing of Holtby on 31 January 2014, concluding the deal prior to the transfer window closing. Upon joining Fulham, Holtby told the club's official website that he was motivated to help them survive relegation and play his way into Germany's 2014 FIFA World Cup squad. He made his debut the following day and played the full 90 minutes in a 3–0 defeat at home to Southampton.

Two weeks later, Holtby was reunited with former Schalke coach Felix Magath when the German was appointed as new club manager following the sacking of René Meulensteen. Prior to his appointment, Magath was the subject of negative comments made by Holtby to German news publication Bild in which he said that he "survived" Magath's methods during their shared time at Schalke. This followed from reports of a feud between the two stemming from Magath's decision to loan Holtby out on two occasions at Schalke. Holtby later said that he was surprised by Magath's appointment but denied that there was a rift between them. In May, Holtby scored his first goal for the Cottagers, temporarily drawing Fulham level against Cardiff City in a match that ultimately ended as a 3–1 loss. It was the only goal he scored in his 13 appearances with Fulham, and the club were relegated to the Championship at the end of the season with a match still to be played.

=== Hamburger SV ===
Following his loan spell at Fulham, Holtby returned to Tottenham and by the end of August 2014 had made three appearances, included in which were two in the Europa League. However, having struggled to make an impact at White Hart Lane with Spurs, and after the club signed Benjamin Stambouli from Montpellier, Holtby elected to return to Germany to join Hamburg on loan the following month. In terms of the loan agreement, Hamburg retained the option to purchase Holtby outright for a fee of £6.5 million. Despite breaking his collarbone during the Rückrunde, Holtby made 22 Bundesliga appearances in his debut season for Hamburg and started in both legs of the club's relegation playoff victory over Karlsruher SC.

On 1 July 2015, it was confirmed that Hamburg had exercised their option to make Holtby's loan move permanent for a reported fee of £4.6 million. He scored his first goal for the club on 29 August 2015, netting the opener in a 2–1 loss to Köln, and scored twice more for the season, including one in a 3–1 win over Dortmund in November, as Hamburg improved to end the campaign in tenth position. During the pre-season for the 2016–17 campaign, Holtby was ruled out for eight–ten weeks after breaking his collarbone for a second time when he was involved in a cycling accident in Switzerland. In December, he received his first career red card when he was dismissed for violent conduct after striking Dominik Kohr in a 1–0 win over Augsburg. He subsequently received a two-match suspension for his indiscretions. Holtby made his 300th senior career appearance on 1 April 2017, and marked the occasion by netting an extra-time winner in a 2–1 man of the match performance against Köln. He then recorded two assists in the final two matches of the season to help Hamburg avoid the relegation play-offs once again, with the club beating Wolfsburg on the final day to steer themselves clear of the drop.

At the start of the following season, Holtby made history when he scored the latest goal in the Bundesliga history, netting in the 100th minute of 4–1 win over Köln. He soon found himself on the periphery at Hamburg, however, with manager Markus Gisdol and then Bernd Hollerbach both electing to use him from the bench, or not at all. He returned to the starting line-up following the appointment of Christian Titz and scored five times in the final eight matches of the season against Stuttgart, Schalke, Freiburg, Wolfsburg and Gladbach, between which he also made his 100th league appearance for the club in a 3–0 defeat to Eintracht Frankfurt. His strong performances towards the back of campaign were, however, not enough to prevent Hamburg from suffering relegation from the Bundesliga for the first time in the club's history. He ended as Hamburg's top goalscorer for the season with six goals, despite only playing 16 matches and on 24 May, with his contract set to expire, signed a one-year extension on a significant pay-cut in order to remain with the club.

Holtby then started in the club's first-ever 2. Bundesliga match on 3 August against Holstein Kiel. He was named captain for the match in the absence of the injured Aaron Hunt but was unable to prevent his side suffering a 3–0 defeat. Later that month, he scored his first-ever cup goal for the club when he opened the scoring in a 5–3 DFB Pokal first-round win over TuS Erndtebrück. Towards the end of the season, and following revelations that Holtby's contract with Hamburg would not be renewed, a group of supporters started an online petition, which gained thousands of signatures, in an attempt to convince the club to extend his stay. His contract was ultimately not renewed and he left Hamburg at the end of the season after the club failed to secure promotion.

=== Blackburn Rovers ===
Following his release from Hamburg, Holtby continued to train with Rot-Weiss Essen and, on 19 September 2019, he returned to England to sign for Championship side Blackburn Rovers. He made his debut for the club two days later, coming on as a second-half substitute in a 2–1 win over Reading. Exactly one month later he scored his first goal for the club and assisted the other in Blackburn's 2–2 draw with Huddersfield Town. Following the turn of the year he scored twice more as the club recorded its biggest league win since 2001 in a 5–0 victory over Sheffield Wednesday. In February, however, he suffered a lateral ligament injury in his knee in Blackburn's 1–1 draw against Middlesbrough.

Holtby's departure from Rovers was announced at the end of the 2020–21 season.

=== Holstein Kiel ===
On 17 August 2021, Holtby joined Holstein Kiel. In the 2023–24 season, he recorded five goals and seven assists as his club secured their first-ever promotion to the Bundesliga. He departed the club by the conclusion of the 2024–25 season.

=== NAC Breda ===
On 11 August 2025, Holtby signed a two-season contract with NAC Breda in the Netherlands. Later that month, on 17 August, he scored his first goal and provided an assist on his debut in a 2–1 victory over Fortuna Sittard. On 12 April 2026, he sustained a laceration on his left leg while wearing tiny shin pads during an away match against Fortuna Sittard which ended in a 1–1 draw. On 14 July 2026, Holtby and the club agreed to terminate his contract. In his whole career Holtby played in three different countries in over 480 first and second level matches.

=== Retirement ===
On 21 July 2026, Holtby announced his retirement from professional football.

== International career ==
The son of Chris Holtby, a former British soldier who was stationed at RAF Rheindahlen in Mönchengladbach, Holtby was eligible to represent England through paternal lineage as well as his native Germany.

=== Youth ===
Having previously represented Germany at U18 level, Holtby made his debut for the U19 level in September 2008 and earned 12 caps overall. He scored the first of his four international goals for the German U19 team on 11 October 2008, netting in a 5–0 victory against Lithuania. The following year, Germany youth coach Horst Hrubesch named Holtby in his squad for the U20 World Cup in Egypt. Holtby scored two goals at the tournament, one of which was against eventual runners-up Brazil in the quarter-finals. In 2013, he captained Germany at the European Under-21 Championship in Israel and was named as the nation's only representative in the Team of the Tournament.

=== Senior ===
While on loan with Bundesliga side Mainz, Holtby caught the attention of national team manager Joachim Löw who named him in the senior squad for the first time for a friendly match against Sweden on 17 November 2010. He was named in the starting line-up and played 77 minutes before being replaced by Mainz teammate Schürrle in a goalless draw, later receiving the man of the match award for his performance. He made his second appearance the following year, coming on as a late substitute for Thomas Müller in a 3–1 UEFA Euro 2012 qualifying victory against Azerbaijan. By appearing in a competitive match for Germany, Holtby precluded himself from representing England in the future in terms of the FIFA eligibility rules. During his career he won three caps in total.

== Personal life ==
Holtby is a lifelong Everton fan, an affiliation he developed as a result of his English father's support of the club. When Liverpool showed interest in him in 2012, he went on record stating that he wouldn't say no to Liverpool as his dream was to play in the Premier League. He said, "I wouldn't even rule out Liverpool, even if it would be tough for my dad – he's an Everton fan."

Holtby's younger brother, Joshua, is also a footballer, who played for MVV Maastricht in the Eerste Divisie and now plays for Preußen Münster in Germany's Regionalliga West. Like Lewis, he previously trained in the academy of Gladbach.

In 2019, he collaborated with Hamburg-based musicians Elvis & Pape on the release of their album titled, Hurrikan.

== Career statistics ==
=== Club ===
As of matches played on 17 May 2026

Appearances and goals by club, season and competition
Club	Season	League			Cup		Europe (Note: Appearances in UEFA Champions League and UEFA Europa League matches)		Other (Note: Appearances in DFL-Supercup, League Cup and Bundesliga play-off matches)		Total	
Club	Season	League	Apps	Goals	Apps	Goals	Apps	Goals	Apps	Goals	Apps	Goals
Alemannia Aachen	2007–08	2. Bundesliga	2	0	0	0	—		—		2	0
Alemannia Aachen	2008–09	2. Bundesliga	31	8	2	0	—		—		33	8
Alemannia Aachen	Total		33	8	2	0	0	0	0	0	35	8
Schalke 04	2009–10	Bundesliga	9	0	2	0	—		—		11	0
Schalke 04	2011–12	Bundesliga	27	6	2	2	11	1	1	0	41	9
Schalke 04	2012–13	Bundesliga	19	4	2	0	6	0	—		27	4
Schalke 04	Total		55	10	6	2	17	1	1	0	79	13
VfL Bochum (loan)	2009–10	Bundesliga	14	2	0	0	—		—		14	2
Mainz 05 (loan)	2010–11	Bundesliga	30	4	2	2	—		—		32	6
Tottenham Hotspur	2012–13	Premier League	11	0	0	0	6	0	0	0	17	0
Tottenham Hotspur	2013–14	Premier League	13	1	0	0	7	2	2	0	22	3
Tottenham Hotspur	2014–15	Premier League	1	0	0	0	2	0	0	0	3	0
Tottenham Hotspur	Total		25	1	0	0	15	2	2	0	42	3
Fulham (loan)	2013–14	Premier League	13	1	0	0	—		—		13	1
Hamburger SV (loan)	2014–15	Bundesliga	22	0	1	0	—		2	0	25	0
Hamburger SV	2015–16	Bundesliga	34	3	1	0	—		—		35	3
Hamburger SV	2016–17	Bundesliga	29	1	1	0	—		—		30	1
Hamburger SV	2017–18	Bundesliga	16	6	1	0	—		—		17	6
Hamburger SV	2018–19	2. Bundesliga	26	4	4	1	—		—		30	5
Hamburger SV	Total		105	14	7	1	0	0	0	0	112	15
Blackburn Rovers	2019–20	Championship	27	3	0	0	—		—		27	3
Blackburn Rovers	2020–21	Championship	27	0	0	0	—		2	1	29	1
Blackburn Rovers	Total		54	3	0	0	0	0	2	1	56	4
Holstein Kiel	2021–22	2. Bundesliga	23	1	1	0	—		—		24	1
Holstein Kiel	2022–23	2. Bundesliga	24	1	0	0	—		—		24	1
Holstein Kiel	2023–24	2. Bundesliga	31	5	2	0	—		—		33	5
Holstein Kiel	2024–25	Bundesliga	25	0	1	0	—		—		26	0
Holstein Kiel	Total		103	7	4	0	0	0	0	0	107	7
NAC Breda	2025–26	Eredivisie	30	1	1	0	—		—		31	1
Career total			483	51	23	5	32	3	7	1	545	60

=== International ===
As of 3 April 2019

Appearances and goals by national team and year
National team	Year	Apps	Goals
Germany	2010	1	0
Germany	2011	1	0
Germany	2012	1	0
Total		3	0

== Honours ==
Schalke

- DFL-Supercup: 2011

Individual

- Gold U19 Fritz Walter Medal: 2009
- UEFA European Under-21 Championship Team of the Tournament: 2013

Records

- Latest Bundesliga goal: 100th minute, against 1. FC Köln on 25 August 2017
