= Ronny Marcos =

Footballer (born 1993)

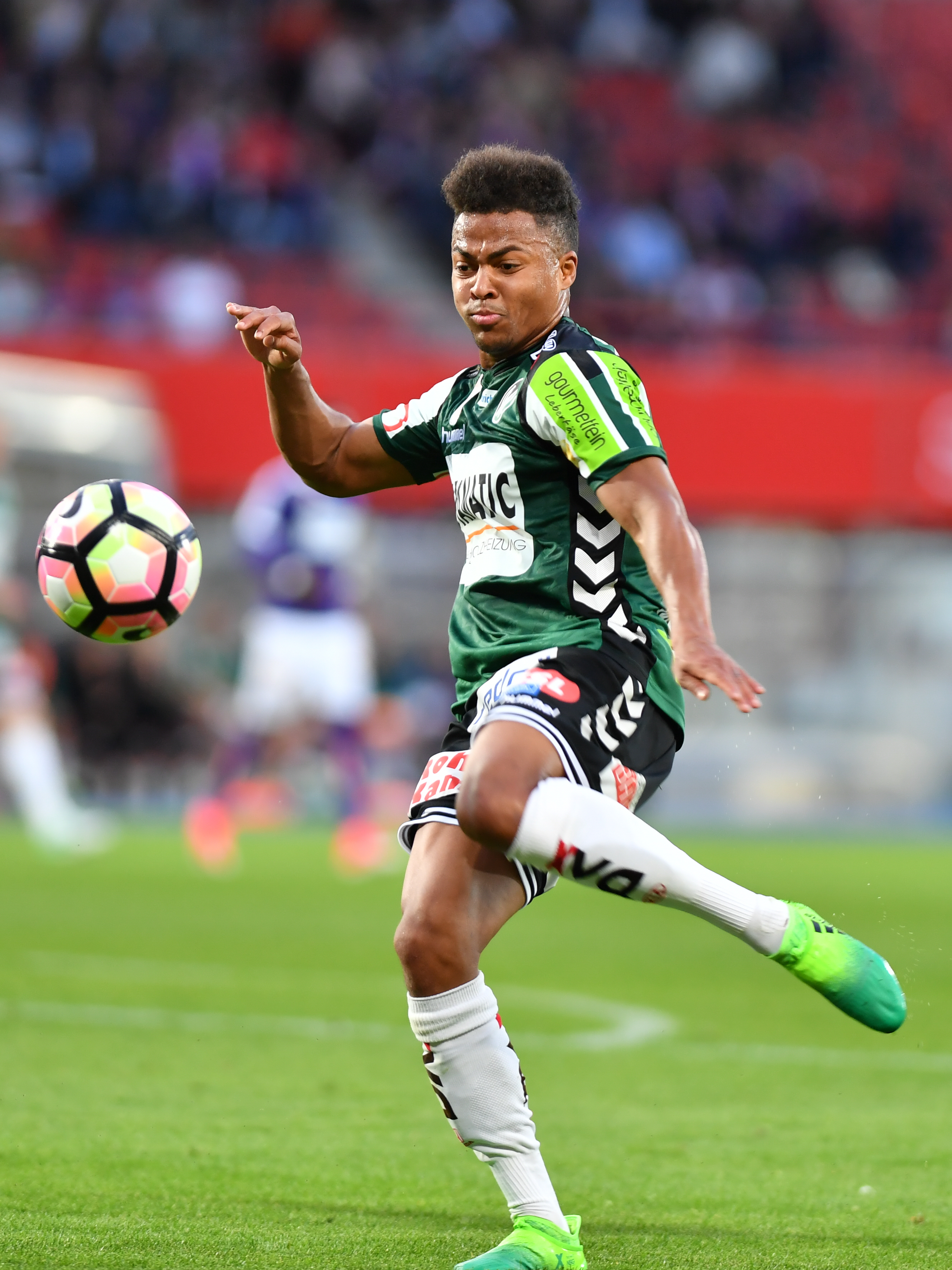
- Marcos in 2017

Personal information
- Date of birth: 1 October 1993 (age 33)
- Place of birth: Oldenburg (Holst), Germany
- Height: 1.74 m (5 ft 9 in)
- Position: Left back

Team information
- Current team: Kickers Offenbach
- Number: 31

Youth career
- JSG Fehmarn
- Oldenburger SV
- 2009–2011: VfB Lübeck
- 2011–2012: Hansa Rostock

Senior career*
Years	Team	Apps	(Gls)
2012–2014	Hansa Rostock	17	(0)
2012–2014	Hansa Rostock II	13	(0)
2014–2016	Hamburger SV II	44	(2)
2014–2016	Hamburger SV	9	(0)
2016–2017	Greuther Fürth	2	(0)
2016–2017	→ SV Ried (loan)	21	(1)
2017–2018	SV Ried	31	(0)
2019	Eintracht Norderstedt	10	(0)
2019–	Kickers Offenbach	197	(2)

International career^{‡}
2015–	Mozambique	1	(0)
- * Club domestic league appearances and goals as of 26 June 2026 ‡ National team caps and goals as of 21 June 2015

Ronny Marcos (born 1 October 1993) is a professional footballer who plays as a left back for Kickers Offenbach. Born in Germany, he represents the Mozambique national team at international level.

== Club career ==
Marcos began his senior career with Hansa Rostock and made his debut for the club in August 2012, as a substitute for Alexandre Mendy in a 4–1 win over SV Babelsberg 03 in the 3. Liga. In January 2014 he signed for Hamburger SV II.

He made his Bundesliga debut with the club's first team on 29 November 2014 in a match against FC Augsburg.

He moved to Greuther Fürth on 9 January 2016.

Marcos joined Kickers Offenbach in July 2019.

== International career ==
Marcos was born in Germany to parents of Mozambican descent. He made his debut for Mozambique in an Africa Cup of Nations qualifier against Rwanda on 14 June 2015 in Maputo.
