= Bernd Wahler =

German businessman (born 1958)

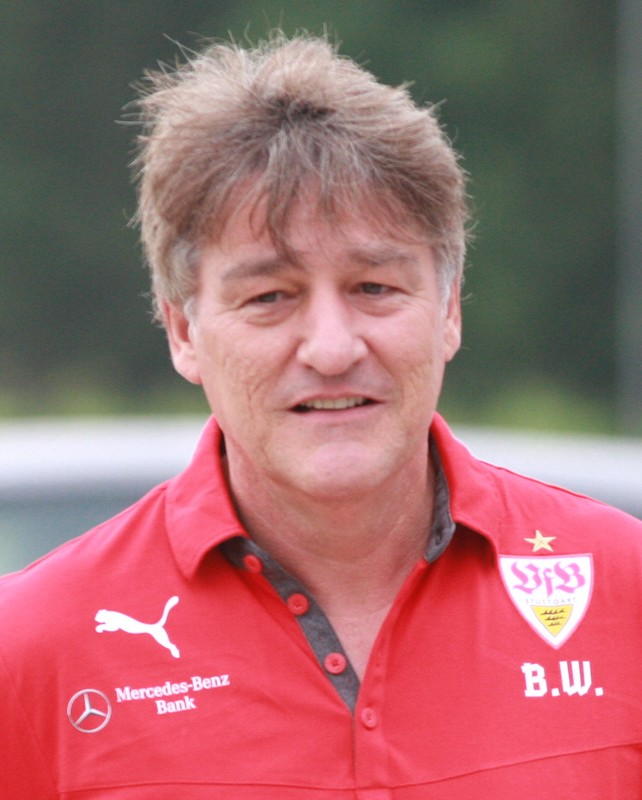
Bernd Wahler

Bernd Otto Wahler (born 24 May 1958, in Schnait) is a German businessman. He was president of VfB Stuttgart between 22 July 2013 and 15 May 2016, his resignation due to Stuttgart's relegation to 2. Bundesliga in 2015-16 season.

He played as a football player for the under-15-team and the under-17-team of VfB Stuttgart. Bernd Wahler joined Adidas in 1987. In 1997, he became managing director of Erima. From 1998 to 2000 Wahler was CEO of Bally Shoe. In 2000 Nike, Inc. hired him as General Manager Germany. He returned to Adidas as Chief Marketing Officer in 2007.

On 2 July 2013 Bernd Wahler was presented by the supervisory board of VfB Stuttgart as their candidate for the election of the new president of the club. Wahler was elected on 22 July 2013 by 97,4% of the votes cast.
