= Mart Ristl =

German footballer

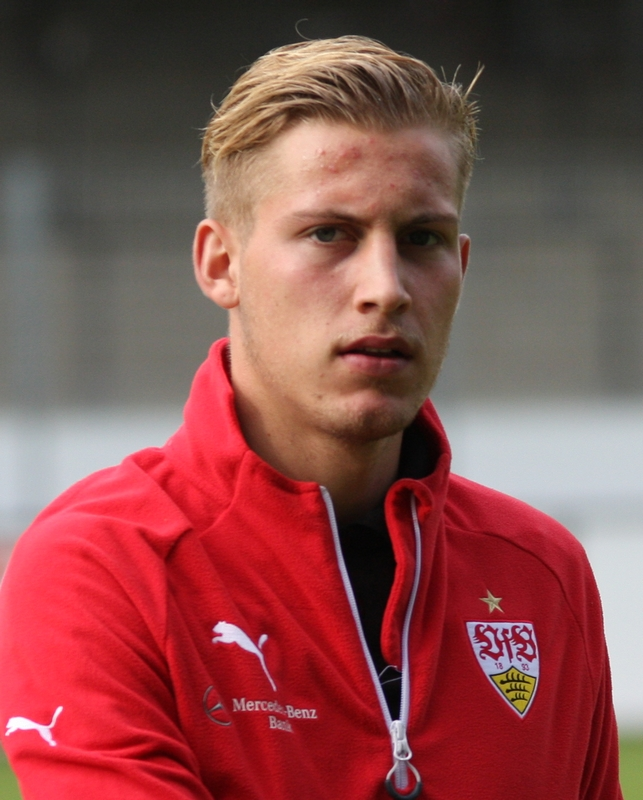
- Ristl with VfB Stuttgart II in 2015

Personal information
- Date of birth: 7 July 1996 (age 30)
- Place of birth: Schwäbisch Gmünd, Germany
- Height: 1.80 m (5 ft 11 in)
- Position: Midfielder

Team information
- Current team: VfR Mannheim
- Number: 23

Youth career
- SV Winnenden
- 2002–2007: TSV Blaufelden
- 2007–2010: FSV Hollenbach
- 2010–2015: VfB Stuttgart

Senior career*
Years	Team	Apps	(Gls)
2015–2017	VfB Stuttgart II	49	(4)
2015–2016	VfB Stuttgart	3	(0)
2017–2018	Sochaux	5	(0)
2018–2019	VfR Aalen	24	(2)
2019–2020	Viktoria Köln	21	(0)
2020–2026	FC Homburg	156	(6)
2026–	VfR Mannheim	4	(0)

International career
2010	Germany U15	2	(0)
2011–2012	Germany U16	4	(0)
2012	Germany U17	3	(0)
2013–2014	Germany U18	8	(0)
2014	Germany U19	7	(0)
- * Club domestic league appearances and goals as of 24 September 2026

Mart Ristl (born 7 July 1996) is a German footballer who plays as a midfielder for VfR Mannheim.

== Club career ==
Ristl was promoted to the first team of VfB Stuttgart for the 2015–16 season. On 31 July 2015, he made his professional debut for VfB Stuttgart II in the 3. Liga against Preußen Münster. Ristl made his first Bundesliga appearance on 24 October 2015 against Bayer Leverkusen.

On 30 August 2017, Ristl moved to Ligue 2 side Sochaux.

== International career ==
He was the team captain of Germany during the 2015 UEFA European Under-19 Championship qualification.
