= Benjamin Uphoff =

German footballer

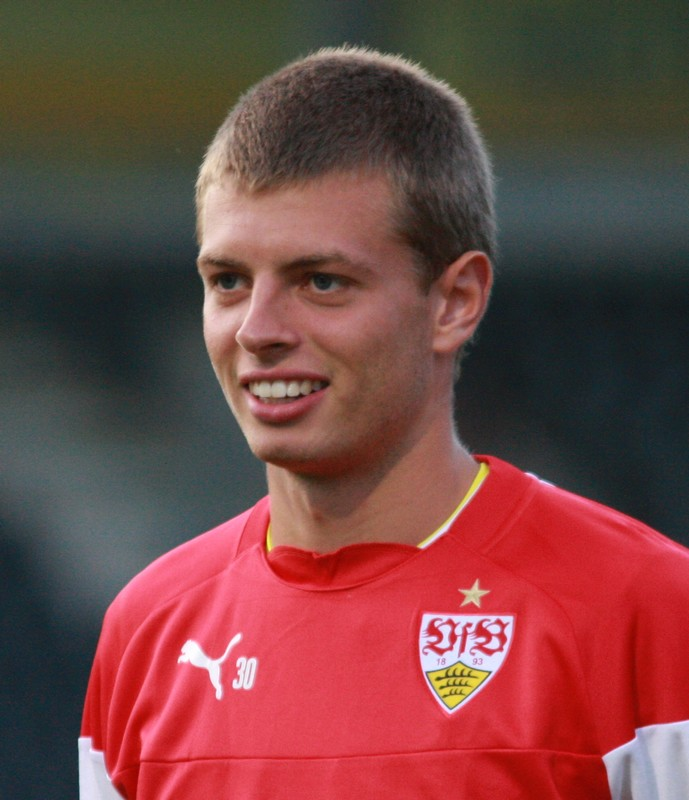
- Uphoff with VfB Stuttgart in 2014

Personal information
- Date of birth: 8 August 1993 (age 33)
- Place of birth: Burghausen, Germany
- Height: 1.92 m (6 ft 4 in)
- Position: Goalkeeper

Team information
- Current team: Eintracht Braunschweig
- Number: 32

Youth career
- 1998–2011: Wacker Burghausen

Senior career*
Years	Team	Apps	(Gls)
2011–2015	1. FC Nürnberg II	63	(0)
2011–2015	1. FC Nürnberg	0	(0)
2014–2015	→ VfB Stuttgart II (loan)	7	(0)
2015–2017	VfB Stuttgart II	43	(0)
2016–2017	VfB Stuttgart	0	(0)
2017–2020	Karlsruher SC	108	(0)
2020–2024	SC Freiburg	2	(0)
2020–2024	SC Freiburg II	20	(0)
2024–2026	FC Hansa Rostock	73	(0)
2026–	Eintracht Braunschweig	0	(0)
- * Club domestic league appearances and goals as of 28 May 2026

Benjamin Uphoff (born 8 August 1993) is a German professional footballer who plays as a goalkeeper for 2. Bundesliga club Eintracht Braunschweig.

== Career ==
On 26 August 2014, Uphoff joined VfB Stuttgart II on loan from 1. FC Nürnberg until the end of the 2014–15 season. On 25 October 2014, he made his debut for Stuttgart II in the 3. Liga against SpVgg Unterhaching. He signed a permanent deal with VfB Stuttgart on 31 August 2015.

In July 2020, media reported Uphoff would join Bundesliga side SC Freiburg from 2. Bundesliga club Karlsruher SC. This was confirmed in August.

On 8 June 2024, Uphoff signed with 3. Liga club FC Hansa Rostock.

On 16 June 2026, Uphoff moved to Eintracht Braunschweig in 2. Bundesliga on a two-season contract.

== Career statistics ==
As of match played 8 November 2024

Appearances and goals by club, season and competition
Club	Season	League			DFB-Pokal		Continental		Other		Total	
Club	Season	Division	Apps	Goals	Apps	Goals	Apps	Goals	Apps	Goals	Apps	Goals
1. FC Nürnberg II	2011–12	Regionalliga	11	0	—		—		—		11	0
1. FC Nürnberg II	2012–13	Regionalliga	20	0	—		—		—		20	0
1. FC Nürnberg II	2013–14	Regionalliga	19	0	—		—		—		19	0
1. FC Nürnberg II	2014–15	Regionalliga	6	0	—		—		—		6	0
1. FC Nürnberg II	2015–16	Regionalliga	7	0	—		—		—		7	0
1. FC Nürnberg II	Total		63	0	—		—		—		63	0
1. FC Nürnberg	2011–12	Bundesliga	0	0	0	0	—		—		0	0
1. FC Nürnberg	2012–13	Bundesliga	0	0	0	0	—		—		0	0
1. FC Nürnberg	2013–14	Bundesliga	0	0	0	0	—		—		0	0
1. FC Nürnberg	2014–15	2. Bundesliga	0	0	0	0	—		—		0	0
1. FC Nürnberg	Total		0	0	0	0	—		—		0	0
VfB Stuttgart II (loan)	2014–15	3. Liga	7	0	—		—		—		7	0
VfB Stuttgart II	2015–16	3. Liga	25	0	—		—		—		25	0
VfB Stuttgart II	2016–17	Regionalliga	18	0	—		—		—		18	0
VfB Stuttgart II	Total		43	0	—		—		—		43	0
VfB Stuttgart	2015–16	Bundesliga	0	0	0	0	—		—		0	0
VfB Stuttgart	2016–17	2. Bundesliga	0	0	0	0	—		—		0	0
VfB Stuttgart	Total		0	0	0	0	—		—		0	0
Karlsruher SC	2017–18	3. Liga	37	0	1	0	—		2 (Note: Appearance(s) in 3. Liga Promotion play-offs)	0	40	0
Karlsruher SC	2018–19	3. Liga	37	0	1	0	—		—		38	0
Karlsruher SC	2019–20	2. Bundesliga	34	0	1	0	—		—		35	0
Karlsruher SC	Total		108	0	3	0	—		2	0	113	0
SC Freiburg	2020–21	Bundesliga	0	0	2	0	—		—		2	0
SC Freiburg	2021–22	Bundesliga	2	0	1	0	—		—		3	0
SC Freiburg	2022–23	Bundesliga	0	0	0	0	0	0	—		0	0
SC Freiburg	2023–24	Bundesliga	0	0	0	0	0	0	—		0	0
SC Freiburg	Total		2	0	3	0	0	0	—		5	0
SC Freiburg II	2021–22	3. Liga	1	0	—		—		—		1	0
SC Freiburg II	2022–23	3. Liga	2	0	—		—		—		2	0
SC Freiburg II	2023–24	3. Liga	17	0	—		—		—		17	0
SC Freiburg II	Total		20	0	—		—		—		20	0
Hansa Rostock	2024–25	3. Liga	11	0	0	0	—		—		11	0
Career total			254	0	6	0	0	0	2	0	262	0
