= Filip Krstić =

German footballer

Personal information
- Date of birth: 24 September 1988 (age 38)
- Place of birth: Munich, West Germany
- Height: 1.85 m (6 ft 1 in)
- Positions: Centre back; left back

Team information
- Current team: Eintracht Mahlsdorf
- Number: 3

Youth career
- 1995–1999: SpVgg Unterhaching
- 1999–2005: Bayern Munich
- 2005–2007: Hertha BSC

Senior career*
Years	Team	Apps	(Gls)
2007–2008	Valencia	0	(0)
2008	Livorno	1	(0)
2009	Arminia Bielefeld II	20	(0)
2010	SV Babelsberg 03	2	(0)
2011–2012	SpVgg Unterhaching	0	(0)
2012	FSV Frankfurt	0	(0)
2012–2013	Berliner AK	29	(1)
2013–2017	Carl Zeiss Jena	77	(0)
2017–2019	Union Fürstenwalde	64	(1)
2019–	Eintracht Mahlsdorf	65	(2)

International career
2004–2005	Serbia U-17	13	(4)
2006–2008	Serbia U-19	15	(1)
- * Club domestic league appearances and goals as of 2 November 2017

Filip Krstić (born 24 September 1988) is a professional football player who plays for Eintracht Mahlsdorf. Born in Germany, he represented Serbia internationally.

== Career ==
Krstić, a German-born Serbian, began his football career at SpVgg Unterhaching in 1995 at the age of 7, then joined FC Bayern Munich in the summer of 1999 when he was 11. He moved to Hertha BSC in late 2005 at age 17 and joined their youth A-team. Krstić played for two and a half years in Berlin, before joining Valencia CF in July 2007. After only six months with Valencia CF, he left to sign for the Serie A club Livorno in Italy, and played his first game on 18 May 2008 against Empoli F.C. Krstić then played in Livorno for one year before signing a contract in Germany with Arminia Bielefeld's reserve team. After one year in their reserves, Krstić left Arminia Bielefeld for SV Babelsberg 03. In July 2010, he spent time as trialist with Dutch club SC Cambuur. In July 2011, he signed for SpVgg Unterhaching, the first club he played for as a young footballer. Following his second stretch with the Munich-based club, Krstić left for a brief stretch of time with FSV Frankfurt before signing with Berliner AK 07 in 2012. After 29 appearances for Berliner AK, Krstić signed with Carl Zeiss Jena in 2013.

=== Position ===
Krstić is a variable defender who can play in either central defense or as a left fullback.

== International career ==
The German-born Krstić was a member of the Serbia national U-17 team at the 2005 UEFA European Championship and also played for the Serbia national U-19 team.
