= Raphael Koczor =

Polish footballer

Personal information
- Date of birth: 17 January 1989 (age 37)
- Place of birth: Racibórz, Poland
- Height: 1.94 m (6 ft 4 in)
- Position: Goalkeeper

Team information
- Current team: FC Kray
- Number: 1

Youth career
- 1995–1997: TuS Wengern
- 1997–1998: TuS Esborn
- 1998–2000: Schalke 04
- 2000–2005: VfL Bochum
- 2005–2008: MSV Duisburg

Senior career*
Years	Team	Apps	(Gls)
2008–2010	MSV Duisburg II	50	(0)
2010–2011	Rot Weiss Ahlen	5	(0)
2011–2013	Sportfreunde Siegen	65	(0)
2013–2014	Viktoria Köln	16	(0)
2014	→ Hessen Kassel (loan)	14	(0)
2014–2019	Carl Zeiss Jena	112	(0)
2014–2019	Carl Zeiss Jena II	6	(0)
2019–2021	TSV Steinbach	29	(0)
2021–2023	Rot-Weiss Essen	0	(0)
2023–	FC Kray	78	(0)
- * Club domestic league appearances and goals as of 21:21, 1 June 2026 (UTC)

Raphael Koczor (Polish: Rafał Koczor; born 17 January 1989) is a Polish footballer who plays as a goalkeeper for FC Kray.

== Career ==
Kaczor was born Racibórz and raised in Wetter, Nordrhein-Westfalen. The former striker played in the youth side for TuS Wengern, TuS Esborn, FC Schalke 04 and VfL Bochum. After two years and 50 games for the reserve team of MSV Duisburg signed on 30 May 2010 a contract for Rot Weiss Ahlen. In 2011, Koczor signed for Sportfreunde Siegen.

On 15 June 2019 TSV Steinbach Haiger announced, that they had signed Kaczor on a 2-year contract.
