= 2025–26 Fortuna Düsseldorf season =

Fortuna Düsseldorf
2025–26 season
- Manager: Daniel Thioune (until 6 October); Markus Anfang (6 October to 12 April); Alexander Ende (from 12 April)
- Stadium: Merkur Spiel-Arena
- 2. Bundesliga: 17th (relegated)
- DFB-Pokal: Second round
- Top goalscorer: League: Cédric Itten (15); All: Cédric Itten (16)
- Highest home attendance: 51,500 (MD4 vs Karlsruher SC, MD15 vs Schalke 04))
- Lowest home attendance: 31,188 (MD9 vs Eintracht Braunschweig)
- Average home league attendance: 41,746
- Biggest win: 3-1 vs Dynamo Dresden (MD31) and SV Elversberg (MD33)
- Biggest defeat: 5-1 vs Arminia Bielefeld (MD1)

The 2025–26 season was the 131st season in the history of Fortuna Düsseldorf and its sixth consecutive season in 2. Bundesliga. The season ended in relegation to the 3. Liga after Fortuna finished 17th in the table. In addition to the domestic league, the team participated in the DFB-Pokal, reaching the second round before elimination by SC Freiburg.

Manager Daniel Thioune was sacked in October 2025 and replaced by Markus Anfang, who was in turn sacked and replaced by Alexander Ende in April 2026.

== Transfers ==
=== In ===
Pos.	Player	Transferred from	Fee	Date	Source
RW	(Germany) Julian Hettwer	(Germany) Borussia Dortmund II	Free	28 May 2025	
LB	(Germany) Christopher Lenz	(Germany) TSG Hoffenheim	Free	29 May 2025	
CB	(Germany) Kenneth Schmidt	(Germany) SC Freiburg	Free	4 June 2025	
RW	(Germany) Luca Raimund	(Germany) VfB Stuttgart	Undisclosed	26 June 2025	
MF	(Netherlands) Anouar El Azzouzi	(Netherlands) PEC Zwolle	Undisclosed	26 June 2025	
MF	(Greece) Sotiris Alexandropoulos	(Portugal) Sporting CP	Loan w/Option to Buy	3 July 2025	
GK	(Germany) Marcel Lotka	(Germany) Borussia Dortmund	Free	9 July 2025	
RW	(Denmark) Christian Rasmussen	(Netherlands) Ajax	€900,000	10 July 2025	
CF	(Switzerland) Cédric Itten	(Switzerland) BSC Young Boys	Undisclosed	28 July 2025	
MF	(Germany) Florent Muslija	(Germany) SC Freiburg	Loan	8 August 2025	
CF	(Slovenia) Zan Celar	(England) Queens Park Rangers	Loan	28 August 2025	
CB	(Norway) Jesper Daland	(England) Cardiff City	Loan	30 August 2025	
MF	(Germany) Tim Breithaupt	(Germany) FC Augsburg	Loan	1 September 2025	
D	(Germany) Elias Egouli	(Germany) Fortuna Düsseldorf II	Signed Professional Contract	20 November 2025	
DF	(Japan) Satoshi Tanaka	(Japan) Sanfrecce Hiroshima	€1,000,000	30 December 2025	
CF	(Netherlands) Jordi Paulina	(Germany) Borussia Dortmund II	Free	3 January 2026	
CF	(Croatia) Marin Ljubičić	(Germany) Union Berlin	Loan (€100,000)	30 January 2026	
MF	(Croatia) Kilian Sauck	(Germany) Borussia Mönchengladbach II	€100,000	2 February 2026	
MF	(Germany) Hamza Anhari	(Germany) Fortuna Düsseldorf II	Signed Professional Contract	11 February 2026	

=== Out ===
Pos.	Player	Transferred to	Fee	Date	Source
GK	(Germany) Robert Kwasigroch	(Germany) Hertha BSC	Loan return	19 May 2025	
DF	(Netherlands) Nicolas Gavory	N/A	End of contract	19 May 2025	
FW	(Germany) Dženan Pejčinović	(Germany) VfL Wolfsburg	Loan return	19 May 2025	
DF	(Germany) André Hoffmann	N/A	End of Contract	19 May 2025	
MF	(Germany) Marcel Sobottka	N/A	End of Contract	19 May 2025	
FW	(Iceland) Ísak Jóhannesson	(Germany) FC Köln	€5,500,000	1 June 2025	
FW	(Germany) Daniel Bunk	(United States) Clemson Tigers	End of contract	1 July 2025	
ST	(Germany) Vincent Vermeij	(Germany) Dynamo Dresden	Undisclosed	11 August 2025	
DF	(Germany) Jamil Siebert	(Italy) US Lecce	€6,000,000	22 August 2025	
MF	(France) Giovanni Haag	(France) Red Star FC	Loan Transfer	1 September 2025	
DF	(Germany) King Manu	(Germany) Energie Cottbus	Loan Transfer	1 September 2025	
FW	(Germany) Jona Niemiec	(Denmark) Odense BK	€180,000	1 September 2025	
FW	(Germany) Dennis Jastrzembski	(Germany) SK Sturm Graz II	End of contract	3 September 2025	
FW	(Germany) Danny Schmidt	(Germany) Rot-Weiss Essen	Loan Transfer	4 January 2026	

== Friendlies ==
=== Pre-season ===
Source: Soccerway

29 June 2025 Friendly	Fortuna Düsseldorf	9-0	SC St. Tönis
18:30 CEST (UTC+2)	Niemiec 4', 45'; Anhari 18', 42'; Vermeij 30' (pen.); Affo 59'; Schmidt 64'; Hettwer 77'; Appelkamp 82'	Report

5 July 2025 Friendly	FC Monheim	0-6	Fortuna Düsseldorf
18:30 CEST (UTC+2)		Report	Vermeij 23'; El Azzouzi 30'; Schmidt 56'; Anhari 71'; Niemiec 80' (pen.); Zimmermann 88'

12 July 2025 Friendly	BW Linz	3-1	Fortuna Düsseldorf
10:30 CEST (UTC+2)	Ronivaldo 33'; Seidl 60'; Goiginger 65'	Report	Vermeij 14'

17 July 2025 Friendly	Fortuna Düsseldorf	0-1	Başakşehir
19:00 CEST (UTC+2)		Report	Beyaz 83'

22 July 2025 Friendly	SSVg Velbert	0-3	Fortuna Düsseldorf
10:00 CEST (UTC+2)		Report	Anhari 16'; Rasmussen 86'; Niemiec 89'

26 July 2025 Friendly	Alemannia Aachen	0-4	Fortuna Düsseldorf
17:00 CEST (UTC+2)	Meyer (yellow card) 42'; Wriedt (yellow card) 58'	Report	Haag (yellow card) 18'; Schmidt (yellow card) 65'; Iyoha 20'; Rasmussen 43' (pen.), 59'; Vermeij 48'

=== In-Season ===
8 October 2025 Friendly	Heracles Almelo	1-3	Fortuna Düsseldorf
16:00 CEST (UTC+2)	Oberdorf 30' (o.g.)	Report	Zimmermann 30'; Moritz Heyer 59'; Zan Celar 90'

10 January 2026 Friendly	Liberec	1-3	Fortuna Düsseldorf
17:00 CEST (UTC+2)	Mahmic 58'	Report	Daland 80'; Anhari 87'; Affo 89'

== Competitions ==
=== Overall record ===
Competition	First match	Last match	Starting round	Final position	Record							
Competition	First match	Last match	Starting round	Final position	Pld	W	D	L	GF	GA	GD	Win %
2. Bundesliga	2 August 2025	17 May 2026	Matchday 1	17th (relegated)	34	11	4	19	33	53	−20	32.35
DFB-Pokal	18 August 2025	29 October 2025	First round	Second round	2	1	0	1	5	7	−2	50.00
Total					36	12	4	20	38	60	−22	33.33

Last updated: 17 May 2026
Source: Soccerway

=== 2. Bundesliga ===
==== League table ====
Pos	Team	Pld	W	D	L	GF	GA	GD	Pts	Promotion, qualification or relegation
14	1. FC Magdeburg	34	12	3	19	52	58	−6	39	
15	Eintracht Braunschweig	34	10	7	17	36	54	−18	37	
16	Greuther Fürth (O)	34	10	7	17	49	68	−19	37	Qualification for relegation play-offs
17	Fortuna Düsseldorf (R)	34	11	4	19	33	53	−20	37	Relegation to 3. Liga
18	Preußen Münster (R)	34	6	12	16	38	61	−23	30	Relegation to 3. Liga

Source: Bundesliga
Rules for classification: 1) Points; 2) Goal difference; 3) Goals scored; 4) Head-to-head results; 5) Head-to-head away goals scored; 6) Away goals scored; 7) Play-off.
(Rules 4–6 only apply after home and away matches have been played between the tied teams.)
(O) Play-off winners; (R) Relegated

==== Results summary ====
Overall								Home						Away					
Pld	W	D	L	GF	GA	GD	Pts	W	D	L	GF	GA	GD	W	D	L	GF	GA	GD
34	11	4	19	33	53	−20	37	7	3	7	22	26	−4	4	1	12	11	27	−16

Last updated: 17 May 2026.
Source: soccerway

==== Matches ====
The match schedule was released on 27 June 2025.

2 August 2025 1	Arminia Bielefeld	5–1	Fortuna Düsseldorf	Bielefeld
20:30	Bazee 45'; Kania 54' (pen.); Felix 75'; Grodowski 78'; Schreck 90'; Boakye (yellow card) 3'; Lannert (yellow card) 9'; Mehlem (yellow card) 31'; Handwerker (yellow card) 90+9'	Report	Itten 35'; Rasmussen (yellow card) 32'; Oberdorf (yellow card) 39' (yellow card) 44' (yellow-red card); Siebert (yellow card) 57'	Stadium: SchücoArena; Attendance: 26,601; Referee: Patrick Alt

9 August 2025 2	Fortuna Düsseldorf	0–2	Hannover 96	Düsseldorf
13:00	Itten (yellow card) 29'; Alexandropoulos (yellow card) 40'; Schmidt (yellow card) 42'; Zimmermann (yellow card) 63'; Rossmann (yellow card) 90+3'; Siebert (yellow card) 90+8'	Report	Tomiak 65' (pen.) (yellow card) 12'; Källman 87'; Okon (yellow card) 3'; Bundu (yellow card) 53'; Matsuda (yellow card) 90+1'	Stadium: Merkur Spiel-Arena; Attendance: 37,590; Referee: Wolfgang Haslberger

23 August 2025 3	Paderborn	1–2	Fortuna Düsseldorf	Paderborn
13:00	Bätzner 84'; Scheller (red card) 12'; Castañeda (yellow card) 38'; Engelns (yellow card) 57'	Report	Itten (yellow card) 34' (goal) 35'; Muslija 42'; Alexandropoulos (yellow card) 31'	Stadium: Home Deluxe Arena; Attendance: 14,500; Referee: Eric Weisbach

30 August 2025 4	Fortuna Düsseldorf	0–0	Karlsruher SC	Düsseldorf
20:30	Muslija (yellow card) 33'	Report	Kobald (yellow card) 36'; Bernat (yellow card) 90+3'; Herold (yellow card) 90+6'	Stadium: Merkur Spiel-Arena; Attendance: 51,500; Referee: Max Burda

14 September 2025 5	Preußen Münster	1–2	Fortuna Düsseldorf	Münster
13:30	Scherder 19'; Jaeckel (yellow card) 30'; Hendrix (yellow card) 65'; Ter Horst (yellow card) 69'	Report	Itten 64'; Muslija 72' (pen.); Schmidt (yellow card) 33'; Rasmussen (yellow card) 85'	Stadium: LVM-Preußenstadion; Attendance: 10,575; Referee: Florian Lechner

21 September 2025 6	Fortuna Düsseldorf	0–3	Darmstadt 98	Düsseldorf
13:30		Report	Akiyama 65'; Nürnberger 67'; Lidberg 74'	Stadium: Merkur Spiel-Arena; Attendance: 31,500; Referee: Timo Gansloweit

27 September 2025 7	VfL Bochum	0–1	Fortuna Düsseldorf	Bochum
20:30	Watjen (yellow card) 66'; Wittek (yellow card) 74'; Alfa-Ruprecht (yellow card) 85'; Lenz (yellow card) 88'; Koscierski (yellow card) 90+5'	Report	Oberdorf 4'; Daland (yellow card) 71'; El Azzouzi (yellow card) 90+3'; Kastenmeier (yellow card) 90+5'	Stadium: Vonovia Ruhrstadion; Attendance: 26,000; Referee: Daniel Schlager

3 October 2025 8	Fortuna Düsseldorf	2-3	1. FC Nürnberg	Düsseldorf
20:30	El Azzouzi (yellow card) 42' (goal) 67'; Oberdorf (yellow card) 61'; Breithaupt (yellow card) 70'; Rasmussen 83'; Thioune (yellow card) 90+11'	Report	Lubach 25'; Justvan 80' (pen.); Becker 85' (yellow card) 88'; Markhiyev (yellow card) 6'	Stadium: Merkur Spiel-Arena; Attendance: 38,204; Referee: Wolfgang Haslberger

17 October 2025 9	Fortuna Düsseldorf	1-2	Eintracht Braunschweig	Düsseldorf
	Schmidt 65'; Itten (yellow card) 45+4'	Report	Conteh 25'; Marie 39'; Breunig (yellow card) 61'; Köhler (yellow card) 75'	Stadium: Merkur Spiel-Arena; Attendance: 31,188; Referee: Patrick Schwengers

25 October 2025 10	Hertha BSC	1-0	Fortuna Düsseldorf	Berlin
	Krattenmacher 76'; Eichhorn (yellow card) 24'; Cuisance (yellow card) 25'	Report	Zimmermann (yellow card) 71'; Raimund (yellow card) 76'	Stadium: Olympiastadion; Attendance: 43,841; Referee: Frank Willenborg

2 November 2025 11	Fortuna Düsseldorf	1–1	1. FC Kaiserslautern	Düsseldorf
	Suso 84'; Breithaupt (yellow card) 18'; Anfang (yellow card) 72'; El Azzouzi (yellow card) 85'; Heyer (yellow card) 90+5'; de Wijs (yellow card) 90+7'	Report	Sirch 55' (yellow card) 85'; Joly (yellow card) 73'	Stadium: Merkur Spiel-Arena; Attendance: 42,000; Referee: Lars Urbst

9 November 2025 12	Holstein Kiel	1–0	Fortuna Düsseldorf	Kiel
	Davidsen 57'; Krumrey (yellow card) 90+5'	Report	Daland (yellow card) 28'; El Azzouzi (yellow card) 33'	Stadium: Holstein-Stadion; Attendance: 14,051; Referee: Felix Bickle

22 November 2025 13	Fortuna Düsseldorf	2–1	1. FC Magdeburg	Düsseldorf
	Itten 37', 90+5'; Breithaupt (yellow card) 40'; El Azzouzi (yellow card) 70'; Rasmussen (yellow card) 74'; Heyer (yellow card) 85'	Report	Lenz 88' (o.g.); Zukowski (yellow card) 56'	Stadium: Merkur Spiel-Arena; Attendance: 40,000; Referee: Tom Bauer

30 November 2025 14	Dynamo Dresden	2-1	Fortuna Düsseldorf	Dresden
16:30	Rossipal 45'; Vermeij 53'; Müller (yellow card) 59'	Report	Rasmussen 84'; Kastenmeier (yellow card) 18'; Daland (yellow card) 90+12'	Stadium: Rudolf-Harbig-Stadion; Attendance: 31,000; Referee: Lukas Benen

5 December 2025 15	Fortuna Düsseldorf	0–2	Schalke 04	Düsseldorf
	Muslija (yellow card) 40'; Oberdorf (yellow card) 39' (yellow card) 55' (yellow-red card); El Azzouzi (yellow card) 45+3'; Iyoha (yellow card) 66'; Schmidt (yellow card) 73'; Daland (yellow card) 83'	Report	El-Faouzi (yellow card) 13'; Karaman 45+2' (pen.); Becker 81'	Stadium: Merkur Spiel-Arena; Attendance: 51,500; Referee: Felix Prigan

14 December 2025 16	SV Elversberg	1-0	Fortuna Düsseldorf	Spiesen-Elversberg
	Keidel (yellow card) 17'; Stange 79'	Report	Suso (yellow card) 32'; Lenz (yellow card) 90+5'; Schmidt (yellow card) 90+5'	Stadium: Waldstadion an der Kaiserlinde; Attendance: 9,307; Referee: Richard Hempel

20 December 2025 17	Fortuna Düsseldorf	2-1	Greuther Fürth	Düsseldorf
16:00	Rasmussen (yellow card) 17'; Egouli (yellow card) 38'; Muslija (yellow card) 44' (goal) 65'; Daland (yellow card) 85'; Itten 24'	Report	Olesen (yellow card) 32'; Reich (yellow card) 90+5'; Futkeu 45+2' (pen.)	Stadium: Merkur Spiel-Arena; Attendance: 48,500; Referee: Timo Gerach

16 January 2026 18	Fortuna Düsseldorf	1-0	Arminia Bielefeld	Düsseldorf
	Itten 86'	Report		Stadium: Merkur Spiel-Arena; Attendance: 39,304; Referee: Sören Storks

24 January 2026 19	Hannover 96	2-1	Fortuna Düsseldorf	Hannover
16:00	Yokota 4'; Kallman 47'; Roggow (yellow card) 38'; Nawrocki (yellow card) 38'	Report	Egouli (yellow card) 15' (yellow card) 57' (yellow-red card) (goal) 49'; Tanaka (yellow card) 26'; Zimmermann (yellow card) 88'	Stadium: Niedersachsenstadion; Attendance: 35,100; Referee: Patrick Ittrich

1 February 2026 20	Fortuna Düsseldorf	2-1	Paderborn	Düsseldorf
	El Azzouzi (yellow card) 55'; Suso (yellow card) 58'; Appelkamp 64'; Itten 83'	Report	Castaneda (yellow card) 11'; Hansen (yellow card) 45+4' (yellow card) 72' (yellow-red card); Okpala 2'	Stadium: Merkur Spiel-Arena; Attendance: 51,000; Referee: Christian Dingert

8 February 2026 21	Karlsruher SC	1-1	Fortuna Düsseldorf	Karlsruhe
	Burnic 54'; Waschenbach (yellow card) 67'	Report	Schmidt (yellow card) 2'; Itten (yellow card) 64' (goal) 41'	Stadium: BBBank Wildpark; Attendance: 27,193; Referee: Felix Bickel

13 February 2026 22	Fortuna Düsseldorf	0–0	Preußen Münster	Düsseldorf
	Suso (yellow card) 27'; Lenz (yellow card) 36'; Iyoha (yellow card) 66'	Report	Heuer (yellow card) 31'; Ter Horst (yellow card) 36'; Sertdemir (yellow card) 62'; Preissinger (yellow card) 90+4'	Stadium: Merkur Spiel-Arena; Attendance: 37,663; Referee: Dr. Robert Kampka

21 February 2026 23	Darmstadt 98	2–1	Fortuna Düsseldorf	Darmstadt
	Lopez (yellow card) 19'; Lidberg (yellow card) 41'; Richter (yellow card) 41'; Kohfeldt (yellow card) 42'; Corredor (yellow card) 90+6'; Hornby 6'; Maglica 88'	Report	Daland (red card) 90+6'; de Wijs 11'	Stadium: Merck-Stadion am Böllenfalltor; Attendance: 17,810; Referee: Michael Bacher

27 February 2026 24	Fortuna Düsseldorf	2–1	VfL Bochum	Düsseldorf
	El Azzouzi (yellow card) 90+2'; Itten 45'; Muslija 57'	Report	Kwarteng (yellow card) 66'; Alfa-Ruprecht 79'	Stadium: Merkur Spiel-Arena; Attendance: 41,066; Referee: Robert Hartmann

7 March 2026 25	1. FC Nürnberg	0-1	Fortuna Düsseldorf	Nürnberg
	Nzingoula (yellow card) 90+4'	Report	Egouli (yellow card) 45'; Muslija (yellow card) 76'; Appelkamp 53'	Stadium: Max-Morlock-Stadion; Attendance: 32,266; Referee: Timo Gansloweit

14 March 2026 26	Eintracht Braunschweig	1-0	Fortuna Düsseldorf	Braunschweig
	Opoku (yellow card) 45+1'; Hoffmann (yellow card) 90+2'; Heusser 62'	Report	Alexandropoulos (yellow card) 4'; Paulina (yellow card) 64'; Egouli (yellow card) 77'	Stadium: Eintracht-Stadion; Attendance: 21,000; Referee: Florian Lechner

22 March 2026 27	Fortuna Düsseldorf	2-5	Hertha Berlin	Düsseldorf
	Heyer (yellow card) 40'; Suso (yellow card) 45+2'; Lunddal (yellow card) 74'; Gechter 4' (o.g.); Itten 54'	Report	Sessa (yellow card) 34'; Leistner (yellow card) 72'; Reese 18' 26'; Kownacki 44'; Winkler 45+6'; Schuler 90+4'	Stadium: Merkur Spiel-Arena; Attendance: 38,391; Referee: Eric Weisbach

4 April 2026 28	Kaiserslautern	3-0	Fortuna Düsseldorf	Kaiserslautern
	Rasmussen 62'; Sahin 76'; Hanslik 90+6'	Report	Suso (red card) 22'	Stadium: Fritz-Walter-Stadion; Attendance: 47,778; Referee: Daniel Schlager

10 April 2026 29	Fortuna Düsseldorf	1–2	Holstein Kiel	Düsseldorf
	Muslija (yellow card) 26'; Heyer (yellow card) 90+1'; Itten 71'	Report	Meffert (yellow card) 10'; Tohumcu (yellow card) 24'; Skrzybski (yellow card) 44'; Kapralik (yellow card) 90+1'; Harres 50'; Nekic 79'	Stadium: Merkur Spiel-Arena; Attendance: 49,500; Referee: Dr. Matthias Jöllenbeck

18 April 2026 30	1. FC Magdeburg	2-0	Fortuna Düsseldorf	Magdeburg
	Ulrich 2'; Zukowski 16' (yellow card) 72'	Report	El Azzouzi (yellow card) 73'; Zimmermann (yellow card) 76'; Egouli (yellow card) 89'	Stadium: Avnet Arena; Attendance: 24,608; Referee: Felix Wagner

24 April 2026 31	Fortuna Düsseldorf	3–1	Dynamo Dresden	Düsseldorf
	Itten 11'; Iyoha 17'; Raimund 58'	Report	Lemmer 90'	Stadium: Merkur Spiel-Arena; Attendance: 38,618; Referee: Tom Bauer

2 May 2026 32	Schalke 04	1-0	Fortuna Düsseldorf	Gelsenkirchen
	Sylla (yellow card) 51'; Aouchiche (yellow card) 67'; Karaman 15'	Report	Breithaupt (yellow card) 22'; Sauck (yellow card) 90+2'; Lenz (yellow card) 90+3'; Daland (yellow card) 90+7'	Stadium: Veltins-Arena; Attendance: 61,587; Referee: Patrick Ittrich

10 May 2026 33	Fortuna Düsseldorf	3–1	SV Elversberg	Düsseldorf
	Zimmermann (yellow card) 30'; Raimund (yellow card) 90+8'; Le Joncour 26' (o.g.); Itten (yellow card) 64' (goal) 43', 51'	Report	Oberdorf 90' (o.g.)	Stadium: Merkur Spiel-Arena; Attendance: 42,165; Referee: Wolfgang Haslberger

17 May 2026 34	Greuther Fürth	3–0	Fortuna Düsseldorf	Fürth
15:30 UTC+2	Will (yellow card) 12'; Itter (yellow card) 77'; Münz (yellow card) 90+3'; Arifi (yellow card) 90+4'; Klaus 2'; Egouli 16' (o.g.); Futkeu 36'	Report	Alexandropoulos (yellow card) 21'; Appelkamp (yellow card) 45+1'; Paulina (yellow card) 79'; Daland (yellow card) 82'; Kastenmeier (yellow card) 90+4'	Stadium: Sportpark Ronhof Thomas Sommer; Attendance: 16,626; Referee: Harm Osmers

=== DFB-Pokal ===
18 August 2025 First round	Schweinfurt 05	2–4	Fortuna Düsseldorf	Schweinfurt
18:00 CEST (UTC+2)	Trslic (yellow card) 37'; Krätschmer (yellow card) 64'; Meißner (yellow card) 90+4'; Wintzheimer 44' (pen.) (yellow card) 70'; Shuranov 83'	Report	Itten (yellow card) 13' (goal) 68'; Rasmussen (yellow card) 41'; Appelkamp 66', 86'; Muslija 72'; Azzouzi (yellow card) 90+4'	Stadium: Sachs-Stadion; Attendance: 10,684; Referee: Timo Gerach

29 October 2025 Second round	Fortuna Düsseldorf	1–3	SC Freiburg	Düsseldorf
20:45 CET (UTC+1)	El Azzouzi 20'; Zimmermann (yellow card) 28'; Daland (yellow card) 90+4'	Report	Matanovic 1' (yellow card) 50'; Günter (yellow card) 5'; Grifo 6'; Müller (yellow card) 89'; Scherhant (yellow card) 90' (goal) 90+3'	Stadium: Merkur Spiel-Arena; Attendance: 36,112; Referee: Felix Zwayer
