= 2024–25 Fortuna Düsseldorf season =

Fortuna Düsseldorf
2024–25 season
- Manager: Daniel Thioune
- Stadium: Merkur Spiel-Arena
- 2. Bundesliga: 6th
- DFB-Pokal: First round
Home colours	Away colours	Third colours

The 2024–25 season was the 130th season in the history of Fortuna Düsseldorf and the fifth consecutive season in 2. Bundesliga. In addition to the domestic league, the team participated in the DFB-Pokal.

== Transfers ==
=== In ===
Pos.	Player	Transferred from	Fee	Date	Source
DF	(Austria) Benjamin Böckle	(Germany) Preußen Münster	Loan return	30 June 2024	
MF	(Greece) Christos Tzolis	(England) Norwich City	€3,500,000	1 July 2024	
MF	(Belgium) Noah Mbamba	(Germany) Bayer Leverkusen	Loan	1 July 2024	
MF	(Germany) Tim Rossmann	(Germany) Karlsruher SC	Free	1 July 2024	
FW	(Iceland) Ísak Bergmann Jóhannesson	(Denmark) FC Copenhagen	€2,000,000	1 July 2024	
GK	(Germany) Robert Kwasigroch	(Germany) Hertha BSC	Loan	13 July 2024	
GK	(Germany) Florian Schock	(Germany) VfB Stuttgart	Free	13 July 2024	
FW	(Germany) Dženan Pejčinović	(Germany) VfL Wolfsburg	Loan	19 July 2024	

=== Out ===
Pos.	Player	Transferred to	Fee	Date	Source
FW	(Austria) Marlon Mustapha	(Italy) Como	Loan return	30 June 2024	
FW	(Germany) Christoph Daferner	(Germany) 1. FC Nürnberg	Loan return	30 June 2024	
GK	(Germany) Dennis Gorka		End of contract	1 July 2024	
GK	(Poland) Karol Niemczycki	(Germany) Darmstadt 98		1 July 2024	
DF	(Austria) Benjamin Böckle	(Austria) Rapid Wien	€200,000	1 July 2024	
MF	(Greece) Christos Tzolis	(Belgium) Club Brugge	€6,600,000	4 July 2024	
MF	(Japan) Ao Tanaka	(England) Leeds United	€4,000,000	30 August 2024	
DF	(Netherlands) Jordy de Wijs	(Netherlands) SC Heerenveen	Loan	2 January 2025	

== Friendlies ==
7 July 2024 Friendly	Holzheimer SG (Germany)	0–3	(Germany) Fortuna Düsseldorf	Neuss
15:30 UTC+2			Affo 12'; Schmidt 39'; Si-Woo Yang 58'	Stadium: Ludwig-Wolker-Sportanlage

12 July 2024 Friendly	Fortuna Düsseldorf (Germany)	4–0	(Hungary) Diósgyőri VTK	Bad Wimsbach, Austria
17:00	Hoffmann 28'; Iyoha 40'; Sobottka 53'; Niemiec 55'			Stadium: HF-Stadion Bad Wimsbach

15 July 2024 Friendly	Fortuna Düsseldorf (Germany)	5–2	(Turkey) Galatasaray	Linz, Austria
19:30	Iyoha 22'; Niemiec 25'; Schmidt 65'; Zimmermann 73'; Affo 84'		Demiraby 35'; Mertens 60'	Stadium: Raiffeisen Arena

20 July 2024 Friendly	Kickers Offenbach (Germany)	1–0	(Germany) Fortuna Düsseldorf	Offenbach
14:00	Wachs 22'
Note: Two periods of 30 minutes

20 July 2024 Friendly	Fortuna Düsseldorf (Germany)	0–1	(Germany) 1. FC Kaiserslautern	Offenbach
15:15
Note: Two periods of 30 minutes

27 July 2024 Friendly	Fortuna Düsseldorf (Germany)	2–1	(England) Ipswich Town
16:00

5 September 2024 Friendly	Twente (Netherlands)	2–4	(Germany) Fortuna Düsseldorf
13:00

10 October 2024 Friendly	Fortuna Düsseldorf (Germany)	0–1	(Netherlands) Heracles Almelo
13:15

6 January 2025 Friendly	Feyenoord (Netherlands)	1–0	(Germany) Fortuna Düsseldorf	Marbella, Spain
14:00	Ivanušec 110' (pen.)	Report

9 January 2025 Friendly	Fortuna Düsseldorf (Germany)	3–2	(Norway) Bodø/Glimt	Spain
15:00

20 March 2025 Friendly	Heracles Almelo (Netherlands)	0–0	(Germany) Fortuna Düsseldorf
13:00

== Competitions ==
=== Overall record ===
Competition	First match	Last match	Starting round	Final position	Record							
Competition	First match	Last match	Starting round	Final position	Pld	W	D	L	GF	GA	GD	Win %
2. Bundesliga	4 August 2024	18 May 2025	Matchday 1		26	11	8	7	43	38	+5	42.31
DFB-Pokal	18 August 2024	18 August 2024	First round	First round	1	0	0	1	0	2	−2	0.00
Total					27	11	8	8	43	40	+3	40.74

Last updated: 16 March 2025
Source: Soccerway

=== 2. Bundesliga ===
==== League table ====
Pos	Team	Pld	W	D	L	GF	GA	GD	Pts
4	SC Paderborn	34	15	10	9	56	46	+10	55
5	1. FC Magdeburg	34	14	11	9	64	52	+12	53
6	Fortuna Düsseldorf	34	14	11	9	57	52	+5	53
7	1. FC Kaiserslautern	34	15	8	11	56	55	+1	53
8	Karlsruher SC	34	14	10	10	57	55	+2	52

Source: Bundesliga
Rules for classification: 1) Points; 2) Goal difference; 3) Goals scored; 4) Head-to-head results; 5) Head-to-head away goals scored; 6) Away goals scored; 7) Play-off.
(Rules 4–6 only apply after home and away matches have been played between the tied teams.)

==== Results summary ====
Overall								Home						Away					
Pld	W	D	L	GF	GA	GD	Pts	W	D	L	GF	GA	GD	W	D	L	GF	GA	GD
26	11	8	7	43	38	+5	41	5	4	5	23	24	−1	6	4	2	20	14	+6

Last updated: 16 March 2025.
Source: soccerway

==== Results by round ====
Round	1	2	3	4	5	6	7	8	9	10	11	12	13	14	15	16	17	18	19	20	21	22	23	24	25	26
Ground	A	H	A	H	A	H	A	H	A	H	A	H	H	A	H	A	H	H	A	H	A	H	A	H	A	H
Result	W	D	W	W	W	D	W	L	W	L	L	D	L	D	W	D	L	D	W	W	D	W	D	L	L	W
Position	2	4	2	1	1	1	1	1	1	1	3	3	7	8	5	4	8	9	7	5	5	5	5	7	9	8

Updated to match(es) played on 9 February 2025. Source: worldfootball
A = Away; H = Home; W = Win; D = Draw; L = Loss

==== Matches ====
The match schedule was released on 4 July 2024.

4 August 2024 1	Darmstadt 98	0–2	Fortuna Düsseldorf	Darmstadt
13:30 UTC+2	Nürnberger (yellow card) 54'; Vukotić (yellow card) 78'; El Idrissi (red card) 83'	Report	Vukotić 55' (o.g.); Hoffmann (yellow card) 79'; Jóhannesson (yellow card) 81'; Rossmann	Stadium: Merck-Stadion am Böllenfalltor; Attendance: 17,810; Referee: Robert Kampka

10 August 2024 2	Fortuna Düsseldorf	0–0	Karlsruher SC	Düsseldorf
13:00 UTC+2	Hoffmann (yellow card) 67'; Klaus (yellow card) 76'	Report	Rapp (yellow card) 39'	Stadium: Merkur Spiel-Arena; Attendance: 36,103; Referee: Robert Hartmann

25 August 2024 3	SSV Ulm	1–2	Fortuna Düsseldorf	Ulm
13:30 UTC+2	Higl 41' (pen.)	Report	Pejčinović 81'; Schmidt 82'	Stadium: Donaustadion; Attendance: 13,226; Referee: Eric Weisbach

30 August 2024 4	Fortuna Düsseldorf	1–0	Hannover 96	Düsseldorf
18:30 UTC+2	Schmidt 59'	Report		Stadium: Merkur Spiel-Arena; Attendance: 35,416; Referee: Florian Heft

15 September 2024 5	Hertha BSC	0–2	Fortuna Düsseldorf	Berlin
13:30 UTC+2		Report	Kownacki 13'; Niemiec 66'	Stadium: Olympiastadion; Attendance: 50,135; Referee: Michael Bacher

21 September 2024 6	Fortuna Düsseldorf	2–2	1. FC Köln	Düsseldorf
13:00 UTC+2	Iyoha 25'; Niemiec 90+5'	Report	Martel 21'; Maina 61'	Stadium: Merkur Spiel-Arena; Attendance: 51,500; Referee: Christian Dingert

27 September 2024 7	Greuther Fürth	1–2	Fortuna Düsseldorf	Fürth
18:30 UTC+2	Srbeny 45'	Report	Haag 43'; Jóhannesson 90+1' (pen.)	Stadium: Sportpark Ronhof; Attendance: 12,405; Referee: Matthias Jöllenbeck

6 October 2024 8	Fortuna Düsseldorf	0–3	Hamburger SV	Düsseldorf
13:30 UTC+2		Report	Dompé 8'; Glatzel 83' (pen.), 90'	Stadium: Merkur Spiel-Arena; Attendance: 51,500; Referee: Martin Petersen

19 October 2024 9	Jahn Regensburg	0–3	Fortuna Düsseldorf	Regensburg
13:00 UTC+2		Report	Oberdorf 44'; Kownacki 81'; Vermeij 89' (pen.)	Stadium: Jahnstadion; Attendance: 12,310; Referee: Lukas Benen

26 October 2024 10	Fortuna Düsseldorf	3–4	1. FC Kaiserslautern	Düsseldorf
20:30 CET	Jóhannesson 35' (pen.); van Brederode 49'; Klaus (yellow card) 76' (goal) 90+4'; Appelkamp (yellow card) 85'	Report	Hanslik 14' 67'; Krahl (yellow card) 34'; Elvedi (yellow card) 49'; Tomiak (yellow card) 52'; Yokota 57'; Ache 61'	Stadium: Merkur Spiel-Arena; Attendance: 44,557; Referee: (Germany) Frank Willenborg

1 November 2024 11	Preußen Münster	1–0	Fortuna Düsseldorf	Münster
18:30 CET	Jano ter Horst 26'	Report	Appelkamp (yellow card) 64'; Oberdorf (yellow card) 69'	Stadium: Preußenstadion; Attendance: 12,422; Referee: (Germany) Michael Bacher

9 November 2024 12	Fortuna Düsseldorf	1–1	Paderborn	Düsseldorf
20:30 CET	Zimmermann (yellow card) 55'; Appelkamp (yellow card) 82'; Götze 90+5' (o.g.)	Report	Lunddal Friðriksson 61' (o.g.)	Stadium: Merkur Spiel-Arena; Attendance: 35,000; Referee: (Germany) Florian Exner

23 November 2024 13	Fortuna Düsseldorf	0–2	Elversberg	Düsseldorf
13:00 CET	Hoffmann (yellow card) 34'; Sobottka (yellow card) 74'	Report	Asllani 58'; Petkov 65' (yellow card) 79'	Stadium: Merkur Spiel-Arena; Attendance: 52,000; Referee: (Germany) Tom Bauer

1 December 2024 14	1. FC Nürnberg	2–2	Fortuna Düsseldorf	Nürnberg
13:30 CET	Jeltsch 15'; Villadsen (yellow card) 66'; Tzimas 84'; Jander (yellow card) 90+5'	Report	Siebert (yellow card) 52'; Oberdorf (yellow card) 57'; Kownacki (yellow card) 59'; Sobottka (yellow card) 64'; Jóhannesson 67' (pen.); Haag (yellow card) 79'; Justvan 90' (o.g.)	Stadium: Max-Morlock-Stadion; Attendance: 36,111; Referee: (Germany) Lars Erbst

8 December 2024 15	Fortuna Düsseldorf	5–0	Eintracht Braunschweig	Düsseldorf
13:30 CET	Kownacki 4' 11'; Jóhannesson 8' (yellow card) 36' (goal) 70'; Pejčinović 87'	Report	Polter (yellow card) 60'; Bell Bell (yellow card) 82'; Ehlers (yellow card) 87'; Krauße (yellow card) 90+2'	Stadium: Merkur Spiel-Arena; Attendance: 34,500; Referee: (Germany) Daniel Schlager

14 December 2024 16	Schalke 04	1–1	Fortuna Düsseldorf	Gelsenkirchen
13:00 CET	Sylla 72'; Bachmann (yellow card) 89'	Report	Jóhannesson (yellow card) 37'; Haag (yellow card) 51'; Lunddal Friðriksson (yellow card) 54'; Kownacki 62'; Sobottka (yellow card) 74'	Stadium: Veltins-Arena; Attendance: 61,955; Referee: (Germany) Florian Heft

20 December 2024 17	Fortuna Düsseldorf	2–5	1. FC Magdeburg	Düsseldorf
18:30 CET	Jóhannesson 15'; Rossmann (yellow card) 31' (yellow-red card) 77' (goal) 42'; Hoffmann (yellow card) 61'	Report	Kaars 11' 70'; Daniel Heber (yellow card) 57'; Gnaka (yellow card) 61'; Atik 67' (yellow card) 73'; El Hankouri 87'; Hercher 90+2'	Stadium: Merkur Spiel-Arena; Attendance: 33,527; Referee: (Germany) Sascha Stegemann

17 January 2025 18	Fortuna Düsseldorf	2–2	Darmstadt 98	Düsseldorf
18:30 UTC+1	van Brederode 41'; Haag 61'	Report	Corredor 69' (pen.), 72'	Stadium: Merkur Spiel-Arena; Attendance: 51,200; Referee: Robert Kampka

25 January 2025 19	Karlsruher SC	2–3	Fortuna Düsseldorf	Karlsruhe
13:00 UTC+1	Kaufmann 9'; Heußer 22'	Report	Pejčinović 47'; Kownacki 81' (pen.), 90+3'	Stadium: Wildparkstadion; Attendance: 30,374; Referee: Wolfgang Haslberger

1 February 2025 20	Fortuna Düsseldorf	3–2	SSV Ulm	Düsseldorf
13:00 UTC+1	Jóhannesson 9'; Kownacki 15', 60' (pen.)	Report	Keller 13'; Batista Meier 52'	Stadium: Merkur Spiel-Arena; Attendance: 32,047; Referee: Timo Gerach

9 February 2025 21	Hannover 96	1–1	Fortuna Düsseldorf	Hannover
13:30 UTC+1	Rochelt 35'	Report	van Brederode 26'	Stadium: Heinz von Heiden Arena; Attendance: 32,200; Referee: Max Burda

15 February 2025 22	Fortuna Düsseldorf	2–1	Hertha BSC	Düsseldorf
20:30 UTC+1	Pejčinović 55', 58'	Report	Reese 13'	Stadium: Merkur Spiel-Arena; Attendance: 38,912; Referee: Tobias Reichel

23 February 2025 23	1. FC Köln	1–1	Fortuna Düsseldorf	Cologne
13:30 UTC+1	Kainz 67'	Report	Jóhannesson 90' (pen.)	Stadium: RheinEnergieStadion; Attendance: 50,000; Referee: Michael Bacher

28 February 2025 24	Fortuna Düsseldorf	1–2	Greuther Fürth	Düsseldorf
18:30 UTC+1	Jóhannesson 8'	Report	Hrgota 9'; Green 75' (pen.)	Stadium: Merkur Spiel-Arena; Attendance: 32,598; Referee: Eric Weisbach

8 March 2025 25	Hamburger SV	4–1	Fortuna Düsseldorf	Hamburg
20:30 UTC+1	Muheim 7'; Selke 40'; Karabec 66'; Stange 90+4'	Report	Kownacki 18'	Stadium: Volksparkstadion; Attendance: 57,000; Referee: Florian Exner

15 March 2025 26	Fortuna Düsseldorf	1–0	Jahn Regensburg	Düsseldorf
13:00 UTC+1	Zimmermann 41'	Report		Stadium: Merkur Spiel-Arena; Attendance: 31,951; Referee: Nicolas Winter

=== DFB-Pokal ===
18 August 2024 First round	Dynamo Dresden	2–0	Fortuna Düsseldorf	Dresden
18:00	Kastenmeier 17' (o.g.); Meißner 69' (Meier); Casar (yellow card) 81'; Menzel (yellow card) 81'	Report	Sobottka (yellow card) 55'; De Wijs (yellow card) 74'; Klaus (yellow card) 81'; Tanaka (yellow card) 85'	Stadium: Rudolf-Harbig-Stadion; Attendance: 29,660; Referee: Sascha Stegemann

== Statistics ==
As of 16 March 2025

=== Appearances and goals ===
No.	Pos	Nat	Player	Total		2. Bundesliga		DFB Pokal	
No.	Pos	Nat	Player	Apps	Goals	Apps	Goals	Apps	Goals
3	DF	(Germany) GER	André Hoffmann	23	0	20+3	0	0	0
4	MF	(Japan) JPN	Ao Tanaka	4	0	3	0	1	0
5	DF	(Germany) GER	Joshua Quarshie	6	0	1+4	0	0+1	0
5	DF	(Germany) GER	Moritz Heyer	11	0	8+3	0	0	0
6	MF	(France) FRA	Giovanni Haag	17	2	13+4	2	0	0
7	FW	(Germany) GER	Dženan Pejčinović	20	5	6+13	5	0+1	0
8	MF	(Iceland) ISL	Ísak Bergmann Jóhannesson	26	9	25	9	1	0
9	FW	(Netherlands) NED	Vincent Vermeij	19	1	3+16	1	0	0
10	FW	(Netherlands) NED	Myron van Brederode	18	3	11+7	3	0	0
11	MF	(Germany) GER	Felix Klaus	15	1	11+3	1	1	0
11	MF	(Germany) GER	Moritz Kwarteng	8	0	7+1	0	0	0
12	DF	(Iceland) ISL	Valgeir Lunddal Friðriksson	17	0	14+3	0	0	0
15	DF	(Germany) GER	Tim Oberdorf	27	1	26	1	1	0
18	FW	(Germany) GER	Jona Niemiec	24	2	5+18	2	1	0
19	DF	(Germany) GER	Emmanuel Iyoha	19	1	15+3	1	1	0
20	DF	(Germany) GER	Jamil Siebert	13	0	12+1	0	0	0
21	MF	(Germany) GER	Tim Rossmann	18	2	12+5	2	1	0
22	MF	(Germany) GER	Danny Schmidt	18	2	5+12	2	0+1	0
23	MF	(Germany) GER	Shinta Appelkamp	19	0	9+10	0	0	0
24	FW	(Poland) POL	Dawid Kownacki	21	10	20+1	10	0	0
25	DF	(Germany) GER	Matthias Zimmermann	24	1	17+6	1	1	0
27	FW	(Poland) POL	Dennis Jastrzembski	1	0	0	0	0+1	0
30	DF	(Netherlands) NED	Jordy de Wijs	5	0	1+3	0	1	0
31	MF	(Germany) GER	Marcel Sobottka	11	0	9+1	0	1	0
33	GK	(Germany) GER	Florian Kastenmeier	27	0	26	0	1	0
34	DF	(France) FRA	Nicolas Gavory	11	0	8+3	0	0	0
39	MF	(Belgium) BEL	Noah Mbamba	7	0	0+6	0	0+1	0
44	DF	(Germany) GER	Jan Boller	1	0	0+1	0	0	0
46	MF	(Germany) GER	Danny Latza	1	0	0+1	0	0	0
46	MF	(Germany) GER	Sima Suso	1	0	0+1	0	0	0
