= 2023–24 Fortuna Düsseldorf season =

Fortuna Düsseldorf
2023–24 season
- Head coach: Daniel Thioune
- Stadium: Merkur Spiel-Arena
- 2. Bundesliga: 3rd
- DFB-Pokal: Semi-finals
- Top goalscorer: League: Christos Tzolis (22); All: Christos Tzolis (24)
- Highest home attendance: 52,000 vs 1. FC Kaiserslautern
- Lowest home attendance: 27,715 vs Wehen Wiesbaden
- Average home league attendance: 39,672
- Biggest win: SV Elversberg 0–5 Fortuna Düsseldorf
- Biggest defeat: Bayer Leverkusen 4–0 Fortuna Düsseldorf
Home colours

The 2023–24 season was Fortuna Düsseldorf's 129th season in existence and fourth consecutive season in the 2. Bundesliga. They also competed in the DFB-Pokal.

== Players ==
=== First-team squad ===
As of 30 August 2023

Note: Flags indicate national team as defined under FIFA eligibility rules; some limited exceptions apply. Players may hold more than one non-FIFA nationality.

No.	Pos.	Nation	Player
1	GK	POL	Karol Niemczycki
2	DF	JPN	Takashi Uchino
3	DF	GER	André Hoffmann (captain)
4	MF	JPN	Ao Tanaka
6	MF	GER	Yannik Engelhardt
7	FW	GRE	Christos Tzolis (on loan from Norwich City)
8	MF	ISL	Ísak Bergmann Jóhannesson (on loan from Copenhagen)
9	FW	NED	Vincent Vermeij
10	FW	GER	Daniel Ginczek
11	MF	GER	Felix Klaus
15	DF	GER	Tim Oberdorf

No.	Pos.	Nation	Player
18	FW	GER	Jona Niemiec
19	FW	GER	Emmanuel Iyoha
20	DF	GER	Jamil Siebert
21	GK	GER	Dennis Gorka
23	MF	GER	Shinta Appelkamp
25	DF	GER	Matthias Zimmermann
27	FW	POL	Dennis Jastrzembski
30	DF	NED	Jordy de Wijs
31	MF	GER	Marcel Sobottka
33	GK	GER	Florian Kastenmeier
34	DF	FRA	Nicolas Gavory

=== Out on loan ===
Note: Flags indicate national team as defined under FIFA eligibility rules; some limited exceptions apply. Players may hold more than one non-FIFA nationality.

No.	Pos.	Nation	Player
22	DF	AUT	Benjamin Böckle (at Preußen Münster until 30 June 2024)

== Transfers ==
=== In ===
Pos.	Player	Transferred from	Fee	Date	Source
FW	(Netherlands) Vincent Vermeij	(Germany) SC Freiburg II	Free	1 July 2023	
MF	(Germany) Yannik Engelhardt	(Germany) SC Freiburg II	€600,000	2 July 2023	
GK	(Poland) Karol Niemczycki	(Poland) MKS Cracovia	Free	19 July 2023	
MF	(Greece) Christos Tzolis	(England) Norwich City	Loan	6 August 2023	
MF	(Poland) Dennis Jastrzembski	(Poland) Śląsk Wrocław	Free	23 August 2023	

=== Out ===
Pos.	Player	Transferred from	Fee	Date	Source
FW	(Poland) Dawid Kownacki	(Germany) Werder Bremen	Free	1 July 2023	
DF	(Austria) Christoph Klarer	(Germany) Darmstadt 98	€2,000,000	18 July 2023	
MF	(Angola) Elione Fernandes Neto	(Austria) Red Bull Salzburg	€3,000,000	10 August 2023	

== Pre-season and friendlies ==
Win Draw Loss Fixtures

21 July 2023 Friendly	Fortuna Düsseldorf (Germany)	3–1	(Germany) VfL Bochum	Düsseldorf
18:00 CEST (UTC+2)	Iyoha 7'; Siebert (yellow card) 29'; De Wijs 49'; Appelkamp 83'		Broschinski 79'	Stadium: Paul-Janes-Stadion; Attendance: 4,000

== Competitions ==
=== Overall record ===
Competition	First match	Last match	Starting round	Final position	Record							
Competition	First match	Last match	Starting round	Final position	Pld	W	D	L	GF	GA	GD	Win %
2. Bundesliga	28 July 2023	19 May 2024	Matchday 1	3rd	33	17	9	7	69	38	+31	51.52
Promotion play-offs	23 May 2024	27 May 2024	First leg		0	0	0	0	0	0	+0	—
DFB-Pokal	13 August 2023	3 April 2024	First round	Semi-finals	5	3	1	1	13	11	+2	60.00
Total					38	20	10	8	82	49	+33	52.63

Last updated: 11 May 2024
Source: Soccerway

=== 2. Bundesliga ===
==== League table ====
Pos	Team	Pld	W	D	L	GF	GA	GD	Pts	Qualification or relegation
1	FC St. Pauli (C, P)	34	20	9	5	62	36	+26	69	Promotion to Bundesliga
2	Holstein Kiel (P)	34	21	5	8	65	39	+26	68	Promotion to Bundesliga
3	Fortuna Düsseldorf	34	18	9	7	72	40	+32	63	Qualification for promotion play-offs
4	Hamburger SV	34	17	7	10	64	44	+20	58	
5	Karlsruher SC	34	15	10	9	68	48	+20	55	

Source: DFB
Rules for classification: 1) Points; 2) Goal difference; 3) Goals scored; 4) Head-to-head results; 5) Head-to-head away goals scored; 6) Away goals scored; 7) Play-off.
(Rules 4–6 only apply after home and away matches have been played between the tied teams.)
(C) Champions; (P) Promoted

==== Results summary ====
Overall								Home						Away					
Pld	W	D	L	GF	GA	GD	Pts	W	D	L	GF	GA	GD	W	D	L	GF	GA	GD
34	18	9	7	72	40	+32	63	10	3	4	32	21	+11	8	6	3	40	19	+21

Last updated: 11 May 2024.
Source: DFB

==== Results by round ====
Round	1	2	3	4	5	6	7	8	9	10	11	12	13	14	15	16	17	18	19	20	21	22	23	24	25	26	27	28	29	30	31	32	33	34
Ground	H	A	H	A	H	A	H	A	H	H	A	H	A	H	A	H	A	A	H	A	H	A	H	A	H	A	A	H	A	H	A	H	A	H
Result	W	D	L	W	W	W	D	L	D	W	W	L	L	W	W	L	W	D	L	L	D	D	W	D	W	W	W	W	W	W	D	W	D	W
Position	6	8	10	5	4	1	1	5	6	5	2	4	5	4	4	5	4	5	5	5	7	7	7	7	4	4	3	3	3	3	3	3	3	3

Updated to match(es) played on 11 May 2024. Source: DFB
A = Away; H = Home; W = Win; D = Draw; L = Loss

==== Matches ====
The league fixtures were unveiled on 30 June 2023.

29 July 2023 1	Fortuna Düsseldorf	1–0	Hertha BSC	Düsseldorf
20:30 CEST (UTC+2)	Ginczek 51'	Report		Stadium: Merkur Spiel-Arena; Attendance: 40,466; Referee: Christian Dingert

5 August 2023 2	FC St. Pauli	0–0	Fortuna Düsseldorf	Hamburg
13:00 CEST (UTC+2)		Report		Stadium: Millerntor-Stadion; Attendance: 29,546; Referee: Daniel Schlager

19 August 2023 3	Fortuna Düsseldorf	1–2	SC Paderborn	Düsseldorf
13:00 CEST (UTC+2)	De Wijs 57'	Report	Muslija 5'; Conteh 59'	Stadium: Merkur Spiel-Arena; Attendance: 30,312; Referee: Robert Hartmann

26 August 2023 4	SV Elversberg	0–5	Fortuna Düsseldorf	Rostock
13:00 CEST (UTC+2)		Report	Klaus 11'; De Wijs 15'; Vermeij 42'; Christos Tzolis 70' (pen.), 79'	Stadium: Waldstadion an der Kaiserlinde; Attendance: 8,366; Referee: Michael Bacher

1 September 2023 5	Fortuna Düsseldorf	3–1	Karlsruher SC	Düsseldorf
18:30 CEST (UTC+2)	Engelhardt 14'; Tzolis 55'; Wanitzek 57' (o.g.)	Report	Teuchert 3'	Stadium: Merkur Spiel-Arena; Attendance: 27,942; Referee: Frank Willenborg

16 September 2023 6	Hansa Rostock	1–3	Fortuna Düsseldorf	Rostock
13:00 CEST (UTC+2)	Van der Werff 45'	Report	Tzolis 17'; Hoffmann 35'; Niemiec 88'	Stadium: Ostseestadion; Attendance: 24,600; Referee: Nicolas Winter

24 September 2023 7	Fortuna Düsseldorf	1–1	Hannover 96	Düsseldorf
13:30 CEST (UTC+2)	Tzolis 59' (pen.)	Report	Teuchert 7'	Stadium: Merkur Spiel-Arena; Attendance: 35,444; Referee: Florian Lechner

29 September 2023 8	Hamburger SV	1–0	Fortuna Düsseldorf	Hamburg
18:30 CEST (UTC+2)	Bénes 83' (pen.)	Report		Stadium: Volksparkstadion; Attendance: 56,100; Referee: Felix Zwayer

6 October 2023 9	Fortuna Düsseldorf	1–1	VfL Osnabrück	Düsseldorf
18:30 CEST (UTC+2)	Iyoha 60'	Report	Engelhardt 90'	Stadium: Merkur Spiel-Arena; Attendance: 33,132; Referee: Robert Kampka

21 October 2023 10	Fortuna Düsseldorf	4–3	1. FC Kaiserslautern	Düsseldorf
20:30 CEST (UTC+2)	Tanaka 36', 63'; Zimmermann 49'; Klaus 57'	Report	Tachie 21'; Siebert 30' (o.g.); Ritter 32'	Stadium: Merkur Spiel-Arena; Attendance: 52,000; Referee: Benjamin Brand

27 October 2023 11	Eintracht Braunschweig	1–4	Fortuna Düsseldorf	Braunschweig
18:30 CEST (UTC+2)	Krüger 59'	Report	Tzolis 12'; Vermeij 15'; Siebert 63'; Tanaka 90+8'	Stadium: Eintracht-Stadion; Attendance: 19,333; Referee: Patrick Alt

3 November 2023 12	Fortuna Düsseldorf	1–3	SV Wehen Wiesbaden	Düsseldorf
18:30 UTC+1	Engelhardt 79'	Report	Lee 10'; Catic 26'; Iredale 42' (pen.)	Stadium: Merkur Spiel-Arena; Attendance: 27,715; Referee: Florian Heft

12 November 2023 13	Greuther Fürth	1–0	Fortuna Düsseldorf	Fürth
13:30 UTC+1	Wagner 48'	Report		Stadium: Sportpark Ronhof Thomas Sommer; Attendance: 10,790; Referee: Max Burda

25 November 2023 14	Fortuna Düsseldorf	5–3	FC Schalke 04	Düsseldorf
20:30 UTC+1	Vermeij 13', 26'; Klaus 19'; Tzolis 65'; Niemiec 90+4'	Report	Kamiński 57'; Kalas 74'; Lasme 75'	Stadium: Merkur Spiel-Arena; Attendance: 52,000; Referee: Robert Schröder

2 December 2023 15	1. FC Nürnberg	0–5	Fortuna Düsseldorf	Nürnberg
13:00 UTC+1		Report	Vermeij 39', 45+3', 56' (pen.); Tanaka 41'; Niemiec 84'	Stadium: Max-Morlock-Stadion; Attendance: 33,062; Referee: Richard Hempel

10 December 2023 16	Fortuna Düsseldorf	0–1	Holstein Kiel	Düsseldorf
13:30 UTC+1		Report	Holtby 18'	Stadium: Merkur Spiel-Arena; Attendance: 31,042; Referee: Florian Badstübner

16 December 2023 17	1. FC Magdeburg	2–3	Fortuna Düsseldorf	Magdeburg
13:00 UTC+1	Bockhorn 17'; Amaechi 37'	Report	Vermeij 46', 75'; Appelkamp 70'	Stadium: MDCC-Arena; Attendance: 20,090; Referee: Michael Bacher

21 January 2024 18	Hertha BSC	2–2	Fortuna Düsseldorf	Berlin
13:30 UTC+1	Tabakovic 30'; Scherhant 45+1'	Report	Jóhannesson 44'; Tzolis 50' (pen.)	Stadium: Olympiastadion; Attendance: 42,902; Referee: Robert Kampka

27 January 2024 19	Fortuna Düsseldorf	1–2	FC St. Pauli	Düsseldorf
20:30 UTC+1	Tzolis 83'	Report	Hartel 16' (pen.), 26'	Stadium: Merkur Spiel-Arena; Attendance: 52,000; Referee: Frank Willenborg

4 February 2024 20	SC Paderborn 07	4–3	Fortuna Düsseldorf	Paderborn
13:30 UTC+1	Kinsombi 19'; Hansen 34'; Bilbija 37'; Kostons 82'		Engelhardt 49'; Mustapha 55'; Jastrzembski 90'	Stadium: Home Deluxe Arena; Attendance: 12,852; Referee: Tobias Welz

10 February 2024 21	Fortuna Düsseldorf	1–1	SV Elversberg	Düsseldorf
13:00 UTC+1	Jóhannesson 19'	Report	Boyamba 53'	Stadium: Merkur Spiel-Arena; Attendance: 31,034; Referee: Richard Hempel

17 February 2024 22	Karlsruher SC	2–2	Fortuna Düsseldorf	Karlsruhe
20:30 UTC+1	Gondorf 48'; Herold 63'		Tzolis 37', 51'	Stadium: Wildparkstadion; Attendance: 26,563; Referee: Marco Fritz

25 February 2024 23	Fortuna Düsseldorf	2–0	Hansa Rostock	Düsseldorf
13:30 UTC+1	Klaus 16'; Tanaka 18'	Report		Stadium: Merkur Spiel-Arena; Attendance: 31,188; Referee: Max Burda

2 March 2024 24	Hannover 96	2–2	Fortuna Düsseldorf	Hannover
13:00 UTC+1	Voglsammer 63'; Teuchert 86'	Report	Tzolis 11', 19'	Stadium: Heinz von Heiden Arena; Attendance: 38,500; Referee: Robert Hartmann

8 March 2024 25	Fortuna Düsseldorf	2–0	Hamburger SV	Düsseldorf
18:30 UTC+1	Klaus 11'; Siebert (yellow card) 56'; Tzolis 63'; Jóhannesson (yellow card) 74'	Report	Heyer (yellow card) 27' (yellow-red card) 51'	Stadium: Merkur Spiel-Arena; Attendance: 52,000; Referee: Martin Petersen

15 March 2024 26	VfL Osnabrück	0–4	Fortuna Düsseldorf	Osnabrück
18:30 UTC+1			Tzolis 35'; Uchino 60'; Mustapha 72'; Tanaka 88'	Stadium: Stadion an der Bremer Brücke; Attendance: 15,741; Referee: Patrick Alt

30 March 2024 27	1. FC Kaiserslautern	1–3	Fortuna Düsseldorf	Kaiserslautern
13:00 UTC+1	Ritter 26'	Report	Tzolis 74', 82'; Appelkamp 76'	Stadium: Fritz-Walter-Stadion; Attendance: 46,210; Referee: Robert Schröder

7 April 2024 28	Fortuna Düsseldorf	2–0	Eintracht Braunschweig	Düsseldorf
13:30 UTC+2	Klaus 42'; Tzolis 55' (pen.)	Report		Stadium: Merkur Spiel-Arena; Attendance: 52,000; Referee: Florian Badstübner

13 April 2024 29	Wehen Wiesbaden	0–2	Fortuna Düsseldorf	Wiesbaden
13:00 UTC+2			Appelkamp 13'; Jóhannesson 64'	Stadium: Brita-Arena; Attendance: 11,200; Referee: Timo Gerach

20 April 2024 30	Fortuna Düsseldorf	1–0	Greuther Fürth	Düsseldorf
13:00 UTC+2	Vermeij 69'	Report		Stadium: Merkur Spiel-Arena; Attendance: 35,789; Referee: Florian Heft

27 April 2024 31	FC Schalke 04	1–1	Fortuna Düsseldorf	Gelsenkirchen
20:30 UTC+2	Karaman 55'	Report	Tanaka 67'	Stadium: Veltins-Arena; Attendance: 61,854; Referee: Harm Osmers

3 May 2024 32	Fortuna Düsseldorf	3–1	1. FC Nürnberg	Düsseldorf
18:30 UTC+2	Vermeij 34', 45+1'; Jóhannesson 72'	Report	Márquez 56'	Stadium: Merkur Spiel-Arena; Attendance: 40,336; Referee: Martin Petersen

11 May 2024 33	Holstein Kiel	1–1	Fortuna Düsseldorf	Kiel
20:30 UTC+2	Pichler 2'	Report	Tzolis 70' (pen.)	Stadium: Holstein-Stadion; Attendance: 15,034; Referee: Sven Jablonski

19 May 2024 34	Fortuna Düsseldorf	3–2	1. FC Magdeburg	Düsseldorf
15:30 CEST (UTC+2)	Tzolis 6', 20', 88'	Report	Teixeira 31'; Krempicki 47'	Stadium: Merkur Spiel-Arena; Attendance: 50,028; Referee: Timo Gerach

==== Promotion play-offs ====
23 May 2024 First leg	VfL Bochum	0–3	Fortuna Düsseldorf	Bochum
20:30 UTC+2		Report	Hofmann 13' (o.g.); Klaus 64'; Engelhardt 72'	Stadium: Ruhrstadion; Attendance: 26,000; Referee: Robert Schröder

27 May 2024 Second leg	Fortuna Düsseldorf	0–3 (a.e.t.) (5–6 p)	VfL Bochum	Düsseldorf
20:30 UTC+2		Report	Hofmann 18', 66'; Stöger 70' (pen.)	Stadium: Merkur Spiel-Arena; Attendance: 51,500; Referee: Deniz Aytekin
	Penalties
	Hoffmann (penalty missed); Jóhannesson (penalty scored); Engelhardt (penalty scored); Oberdorf (penalty scored); Tzolis (penalty scored); Niemiec (penalty scored); Uchino (penalty missed)		(penalty scored) Paciência; (penalty scored) Bero; (penalty missed) Mašović; (penalty scored) Asano; (penalty scored) Stöger; (penalty scored) Schlotterbeck; (penalty scored) Wittek

=== DFB-Pokal ===
13 August 2023 First round	FV Illertissen	1–3	Fortuna Düsseldorf	Illertissen
15:30 CEST (UTC+2)	Frisorger 41'	Report	Frisorger 3' (o.g.); Vermeij 25'; Tzolis 90+1'	Stadium: Vöhlinstadion; Referee: Lars Erbst

31 October 2023 Second round	SpVgg Unterhaching	3–6 (a.e.t.)	Fortuna Düsseldorf	Unterhaching
20:45 CET (UTC+1)	Hobsch 34', 55' (pen.); Skarlatidis 71'		Klaus 65'; Jóhannesson 66', 78', 107'; Tzolis 115'; Jastrzembski 117'	Stadium: Sportpark Unterhaching; Attendance: 10,000; Referee: Alexander Sather

5 December 2023 Round of 16	1. FC Magdeburg	1–2	Fortuna Düsseldorf	Magdeburg
18:00 UTC+1	Atik 15'	Report	Niemiec 87', 90+2'	Stadium: MDCC-Arena; Attendance: 20,090; Referee: Robert Hartmann

30 January 2024 Quarter-finals	FC St. Pauli	2–2 (a.e.t.) (3–4 p)	Fortuna Düsseldorf	Hamburg
20:45 UTC+1	Hartel 60' (pen.); Boukhalfa 120+1'	Report	Vermeij 38' (pen.); Tanaka 99'	Stadium: Millerntor-Stadion; Attendance: 29,564; Referee: Sascha Stegemann
	Penalties
	Hartel (penalty missed); Maurides (penalty missed); Sinani (penalty scored); Saad (penalty scored); Smith (penalty scored)		(penalty scored) Hoffmann; (penalty missed) Daferner; (penalty scored) Engelhardt; (penalty scored) Tanaka; (penalty scored) Tzolis

3 April 2024 Semi-finals	Bayer Leverkusen	4–0	Fortuna Düsseldorf	Leverkusen
20:45 UTC+2	Frimpong 7'; Adli 20'; Wirtz 36', 60' (pen.)	Report		Stadium: BayArena; Attendance: 30,210; Referee: Christian Dingert
