= Bunk =

Bunk may refer to:

== People ==
=== Nickname, given name or stage name ===
- Bunk Congalton (1875–1937), Canadian Major League Baseball player
- Bunk Henderson, American Negro league catcher in 1925
- Bunk Johnson (1879–1949), New Orleans jazz trumpeter
- Oscar Requer (fl. 1964–2007), nicknamed "The Bunk", a former Baltimore police detective upon whom the character Bunk Moreland (see below) is based
- Bunk Gardner, stage name of American musician John Leon Guarnera (born 1933), a member of Frank Zappa's Mothers of Invention

=== Surname ===
- Carsten Bunk (born 1960), German rower who competed for East Germany in the 1980 Summer Olympics
- Daniel Bunk (born 2004), German footballer
- Leo Bunk (born 1962), German former footballer
- Tom Bunk (born 1945), American cartoonist

== Arts and entertainment ==
- Bunk (TV series), a 2012 television show on the Independent Film Channel
- "Bunk", an episode of the television series CSI: Miami (season 1)
- Bunk (book), a 2017 book by Kevin Young
- Bunk Moreland, a character on the HBO drama series The Wire
- Bunks (film), a 2013 Canada television film

== Other uses ==
- bunk, the bed frame of a bunk bed, a type of bed
- Chicory, a plant also known as bunk
- Bunking (off), or bunk off, slang for truanting
- bunkum, shortened to bunk or "bunc": nonsense (see Buncombe County, North Carolina: History)

== See also ==
- Bunk'd, a 2015 American comedy television series
