= 2023–24 Bundesliga =

Bundesliga
- Season: 2023–24
- Dates: 18 August 2023 – 18 May 2024
- Champions: Bayer Leverkusen; 1st Bundesliga title 1st German title
- Relegated: 1. FC Köln; Darmstadt 98
- Champions League: Bayer Leverkusen; VfB Stuttgart; Bayern Munich; RB Leipzig; Borussia Dortmund
- Europa League: Eintracht Frankfurt; TSG Hoffenheim
- Conference League: 1. FC Heidenheim
- Matches: 306
- Goals: 985 (3.22 per match)
- Top goalscorer: Harry Kane (36 goals)
- Biggest home win: Munich 8–0 Darmstadt
- Biggest away win: Darmstadt 0–6 Augsburg; Darmstadt 0–6 Hoffenheim
- Highest scoring: Munich 8–1 Mainz
- Longest winning run: 10 games Leverkusen
- Longest unbeaten run: 34 games Leverkusen
- Longest winless run: 22 games Darmstadt
- Longest losing run: 9 games Union
- Highest attendance: 81,365; Sixteen games
- Lowest attendance: 15,000; Seventeen games
- Attendance: 11,925,726 (38,973 per match)

The 2023–24 Bundesliga was the 61st season of the Bundesliga, Germany's premier football competition. It began on 18 August 2023 and concluded on 18 May 2024. The fixtures were announced on 30 June 2023.

On 14 April 2024, Bayer Leverkusen were crowned champions for the first time with five matches to spare following a 5–0 win over Werder Bremen, becoming the thirteenth different champion in Bundesliga history and ending previous holders Bayern Munich's run of eleven consecutive titles.

Bayer Leverkusen became the first Bundesliga team to finish an entire season unbeaten, with a record of 28 wins and six draws.

== Teams ==
Locations of the 2023–24 Bundesliga teams

A total of 18 teams participated in the 2023–24 edition of the Bundesliga.

=== Team changes ===
Promoted from 2022–23 2. Bundesliga	Relegated from 2022–23 Bundesliga
1. FC Heidenheim; Darmstadt 98	Schalke 04; Hertha BSC

SV Darmstadt 98 returned to the Bundesliga after a six-year absence while 1. FC Heidenheim competed in the Bundesliga for the first time in the club's history became 57th Bundesliga club.

=== Stadiums and locations ===
Team	Location	Stadium	Capacity	R.
FC Augsburg	Augsburg	WWK Arena	30,660	
Union Berlin	Berlin	Stadion An der Alten Försterei	22,012	
VfL Bochum	Bochum	Vonovia Ruhrstadion	26,000	
Werder Bremen	Bremen	Wohninvest Weserstadion	42,100	
Darmstadt 98	Darmstadt	Merck-Stadion am Böllenfalltor	17,810	
Borussia Dortmund	Dortmund	Signal Iduna Park	81,365	
Eintracht Frankfurt	Frankfurt	Deutsche Bank Park	58,000	
SC Freiburg	Freiburg im Breisgau	Europa-Park Stadion	34,700	
1. FC Heidenheim	Heidenheim	Voith-Arena	15,000	
TSG Hoffenheim	Sinsheim	PreZero Arena	30,150	
1. FC Köln	Cologne	RheinEnergieStadion	50,000	
RB Leipzig	Leipzig	Red Bull Arena	47,069	
Bayer Leverkusen	Leverkusen	BayArena	30,210	
Mainz 05	Mainz	Mewa Arena	33,305	
Borussia Mönchengladbach	Mönchengladbach	Borussia-Park	54,042	
Bayern Munich	Munich	Allianz Arena	75,000	
VfB Stuttgart	Stuttgart	MHPArena	60,058	
VfL Wolfsburg	Wolfsburg	Volkswagen Arena	28,917	

=== Personnel and kits ===
Team	Manager	Captain	Kit manufacturer	Shirt sponsor	
Team	Manager	Captain	Kit manufacturer	Front	Sleeve
FC Augsburg	(Denmark) Jess Thorup	(Bosnia and Herzegovina) Ermedin Demirović	Mizuno	WWK Versicherung	Siegmund
Union Berlin	(Germany) Marco Grote	(Austria) Christopher Trimmel	Adidas	Paramount+	JD Sports
VfL Bochum	(Germany) Heiko Butscher	(France) Anthony Losilla	Mizuno	Vonovia	Think about IT Moritz Fiege (in cup matches)
Werder Bremen	(Germany) Ole Werner	(Austria) Marco Friedl	Hummel	Matthäi	Ammerländer
Darmstadt 98	(Germany) Torsten Lieberknecht	(Germany) Fabian Holland	Craft	HAIX	28 Black
Borussia Dortmund	(Germany) Edin Terzić	(Germany) Emre Can	Puma	1&1 Evonik (in cup and UEFA matches)	GLS Group
Eintracht Frankfurt	(Germany) Dino Toppmöller	(Germany) Sebastian Rode	Nike	Indeed.com	Elotrans reload
SC Freiburg	(Germany) Christian Streich	(Germany) Christian Günter	Nike	JobRad	Lexware
1. FC Heidenheim	(Germany) Frank Schmidt	(Germany) Patrick Mainka	Puma	MHP	Voith
TSG Hoffenheim	(United States) Pellegrino Matarazzo	(Germany) Oliver Baumann	Joma	SAP	hep global
1. FC Köln	(Germany) Timo Schultz	(Austria) Florian Kainz	Hummel	REWE	DEVK
RB Leipzig	(Germany) Marco Rose	(Hungary) Willi Orbán	Nike	Red Bull	AOC Die Stadtentwickler IHG Hotels & Resorts (in cup and UEFA matches)
Bayer Leverkusen	(Spain) Xabi Alonso	(Finland) Lukas Hradecky	Castore	Barmenia Versicherungen	Trive Kumho Tyres (in cup matches)
Mainz 05	(Denmark) Bo Henriksen	(Switzerland) Silvan Widmer	Jako	Kömmerling	iDM
Borussia Mönchengladbach	(Switzerland) Gerardo Seoane	(Switzerland) Jonas Omlin	Puma	Flatex	Sonepar
Bayern Munich	(Germany) Thomas Tuchel	(Germany) Manuel Neuer	Adidas	Deutsche Telekom	Audi (in cup and UEFA matches)
VfB Stuttgart	(Germany) Sebastian Hoeneß	(Germany) Waldemar Anton	Jako	Winamax	hep global
VfL Wolfsburg	(Austria) Ralph Hasenhüttl	(Germany) Maximilian Arnold	Nike	Volkswagen/Tiguan	Linglong Tire

=== Managerial changes ===
Team	Outgoing	Manner	Exit date		Position in table	Incoming	Incoming date		Ref.
Team	Outgoing	Manner	Announced on	Departed on	Position in table	Incoming	Announced on	Arrived on	Ref.
Eintracht Frankfurt	(Austria) Oliver Glasner	Mutual consent	9 May 2023	30 June 2023	Pre-season	(Germany) Dino Toppmöller	12 June 2023	1 July 2023	
Borussia Mönchengladbach	(Germany) Daniel Farke	Sacked	2 June 2023	30 June 2023	Pre-season	(Switzerland) Gerardo Seoane	6 June 2023	1 July 2023	
FC Augsburg	(Germany) Enrico Maaßen	Sacked	9 October 2023		15th	(Denmark) Jess Thorup	15 October 2023		
Mainz 05	(Denmark) Bo Svensson	Mutual consent	2 November 2023		18th	(Germany) Jan Siewert (Note: Siewert was initially named as interim head coach, before being appointed on a permanent basis on 22 December 2023.)	2 November 2023		
Union Berlin	(Switzerland) Urs Fischer	Mutual consent	15 November 2023		18th	(Germany) Marco Grote (interim)	15 November 2023		
Union Berlin	(Germany) Marco Grote	End of interim spell	26 November 2023		17th	(Croatia) Nenad Bjelica	26 November 2023		
1. FC Köln	(Germany) Steffen Baumgart	Mutual consent	21 December 2023		17th	(Germany) Timo Schultz	4 January 2024		
Mainz 05	(Germany) Jan Siewert	Sacked	12 February 2024		17th	(Denmark) Bo Henriksen	13 February 2024		
VfL Wolfsburg	(Croatia) Niko Kovač	Sacked	17 March 2024		14th	(Austria) Ralph Hasenhüttl	17 March 2024		
VfL Bochum	(Germany) Thomas Letsch	Sacked	8 April 2024		15th	(Germany) Heiko Butscher (interim)	9 April 2024		
Union Berlin	(Croatia) Nenad Bjelica	Sacked	6 May 2024		15th	(Germany) Marco Grote (interim)	6 May 2024		

== League table ==
Pos	Team	Pld	W	D	L	GF	GA	GD	Pts	Qualification or relegation
1	Bayer Leverkusen (C)	34	28	6	0	89	24	+65	90	Qualification for the Champions League league phase (Note: The Bundesliga gained an additional Champions League place as a result of Germany finishing as one of the two associations with the highest UEFA coefficient points in 2023–24.)
2	VfB Stuttgart	34	23	4	7	78	39	+39	73	Qualification for the Champions League league phase
3	Bayern Munich	34	23	3	8	94	45	+49	72	Qualification for the Champions League league phase
4	RB Leipzig	34	19	8	7	77	39	+38	65	Qualification for the Champions League league phase
5	Borussia Dortmund	34	18	9	7	68	43	+25	63	Qualification for the Champions League league phase
6	Eintracht Frankfurt	34	11	14	9	51	50	+1	47	Qualification for the Europa League league phase (Note: Since the 2023–24 DFB-Pokal winners, Bayer Leverkusen, qualified for the Champions League via league position, the spot reserved for the DFB-Pokal winners (Europa League league phase) was passed to the seventh-placed team, and the Conference League play-off round spot was passed to the eighth-placed team.)
7	TSG Hoffenheim	34	13	7	14	66	66	0	46	Qualification for the Europa League league phase
8	1. FC Heidenheim	34	10	12	12	50	55	−5	42	Qualification for the Conference League play-off round
9	Werder Bremen	34	11	9	14	48	54	−6	42	
10	SC Freiburg	34	11	9	14	45	58	−13	42	
11	FC Augsburg	34	10	9	15	50	60	−10	39	
12	VfL Wolfsburg	34	10	7	17	41	56	−15	37	
13	Mainz 05	34	7	14	13	39	51	−12	35	
14	Borussia Mönchengladbach	34	7	13	14	56	67	−11	34	
15	Union Berlin	34	9	6	19	33	58	−25	33	
16	VfL Bochum (O)	34	7	12	15	42	74	−32	33	Qualification for the relegation play-offs
17	1. FC Köln (R)	34	5	12	17	28	60	−32	27	Relegation to 2. Bundesliga
18	Darmstadt 98 (R)	34	3	8	23	30	86	−56	17	Relegation to 2. Bundesliga

Source: DFB
Rules for classification: 1) Points; 2) Goal difference; 3) Goals scored; 4) Head-to-head results; 5) Head-to-head away goals scored; 6) Away goals scored; 7) Play-off.
(C) Champions; (O) Play-off winners; (R) Relegated

== Results ==
Home \ Away	AUG	UNB	BOC	BRE	DAR	DOR	FRA	FRE	HEI	HOF	KÖL	LEI	LEV	MAI	MÖN	MUN	STU	WOL
FC Augsburg	—	2–0	2–2	0–3	1–2	1–1	2–1	2–1	1–0	1–1	1–1	2–2	0–1	2–1	4–4	2–3	0–1	3–2
Union Berlin	1–1	—	3–4	2–1	1–0	0–2	0–3	2–1	2–2	0–2	2–0	0–3	0–1	4–1	3–1	1–5	0–3	1–0
VfL Bochum	1–1	3–0	—	1–1	2–2	1–1	1–1	1–2	1–1	3–2	1–1	1–4	0–5	2–2	1–3	3–2	1–0	3–1
Werder Bremen	2–0	2–0	4–1	—	1–1	1–2	2–2	3–1	1–2	2–3	2–1	1–1	0–3	4–0	2–2	0–4	2–1	0–2
Darmstadt 98	0–6	1–4	1–2	4–2	—	0–3	2–2	0–1	0–1	0–6	0–1	1–3	0–2	0–0	3–3	2–5	1–2	0–1
Borussia Dortmund	5–1	4–2	3–1	1–0	4–0	—	3–1	3–0	2–2	2–3	1–0	2–3	1–1	1–1	4–2	0–4	0–1	1–0
Eintracht Frankfurt	3–1	0–0	1–1	1–1	1–0	3–3	—	0–0	2–0	3–1	1–1	2–2	1–5	1–0	2–1	5–1	1–2	2–2
SC Freiburg	2–0	0–0	2–1	1–0	1–1	2–4	3–3	—	1–1	3–2	2–0	1–4	2–3	1–1	3–3	2–2	1–3	1–2
1. FC Heidenheim	2–5	1–0	0–0	4–2	3–2	0–0	1–2	3–2	—	2–3	4–1	1–2	1–2	1–1	1–1	3–2	2–0	1–1
TSG Hoffenheim	3–1	0–1	3–1	2–1	3–3	1–3	1–3	1–2	1–1	—	1–1	1–1	2–3	1–1	4–3	4–2	0–3	3–1
1. FC Köln	1–1	3–2	2–1	0–1	0–2	0–4	2–0	0–0	1–1	1–3	—	1–5	0–2	0–0	3–1	0–1	0–2	1–2
RB Leipzig	3–0	2–0	0–0	1–1	2–0	4–1	0–1	3–1	2–1	3–1	6–0	—	2–3	0–0	2–0	2–2	5–1	3–0
Bayer Leverkusen	2–1	4–0	4–0	5–0	5–1	1–1	3–0	2–1	4–1	2–1	3–0	3–2	—	2–1	0–0	3–0	2–2	2–0
Mainz 05	1–0	1–1	2–0	0–1	4–0	3–0	1–1	0–1	0–1	4–1	1–1	2–0	0–3	—	1–1	1–3	1–3	1–1
Borussia Mönchengladbach	1–2	0–0	5–2	2–2	0–0	1–2	1–1	0–3	2–1	2–1	3–3	0–1	0–3	2–2	—	1–2	3–1	4–0
Bayern Munich	3–1	1–0	7–0	0–1	8–0	0–2	2–1	3–0	4–2	3–0	2–0	2–1	2–2	8–1	3–1	—	3–0	2–0
VfB Stuttgart	3–0	2–0	5–0	2–0	3–1	2–1	3–0	5–0	3–3	2–3	1–1	5–2	1–1	3–1	4–0	3–1	—	3–1
VfL Wolfsburg	1–3	2–1	1–0	2–2	3–0	1–1	2–0	0–1	2–0	2–2	1–1	2–1	1–2	1–3	1–3	1–2	2–3	—

Source: DFB
Legend: Blue = home team win; Yellow = draw; Red = away team win.

== Relegation play-offs ==
The relegation play-offs took place on 23 and 27 May 2024.

=== Overview ===
Team 1	Agg.	Team 2	1st leg	2nd leg
VfL Bochum (B)	3–3 (6–5 p)	Fortuna Düsseldorf (2B)	0–3	3–0 (a.e.t.)

=== Matches ===
23 May 2024
20:30

VfL Bochum	0–3	Fortuna Düsseldorf
	Report	P. Hofmann 13' (o.g.); Klaus 64'; Engelhardt 72'

Vonovia Ruhrstadion, Bochum
Attendance: 26,000
Referee: Robert Schröder
27 May 2024
20:30

Fortuna Düsseldorf	0–3 (a.e.t.)	VfL Bochum
	Report	P. Hofmann 18', 66'; Stöger 70' (pen.)
Penalties
A. Hofmann (penalty missed); Jóhannesson (penalty scored); Engelhardt (penalty scored); Oberdorf (penalty scored); Tzolis (penalty scored); Niemiec (penalty scored); Uchino (penalty missed)	5–6	(penalty scored) Paciência; (penalty scored) Bero; (penalty missed) Mašović; (penalty scored) Asano; (penalty scored) Stöger; (penalty scored) Schlotterbeck; (penalty scored) Wittek

Merkur Spiel-Arena, Düsseldorf
Attendance: 51,500
Referee: Deniz Aytekin

3–3 on aggregate. VfL Bochum won 6–5 on penalties, and therefore both clubs remained in their respective leagues.

== Statistics ==
=== Top goalscorers ===
Rank	Player	Club	Goals
1	(England) Harry Kane	Bayern Munich	36
2	(Guinea) Serhou Guirassy	VfB Stuttgart	28
3	(Belgium) Loïs Openda	RB Leipzig	24
4	(Germany) Deniz Undav	VfB Stuttgart	18
5	(Germany) Maximilian Beier	TSG Hoffenheim	16
6	(Bosnia and Herzegovina) Ermedin Demirović	FC Augsburg	15
6	(Croatia) Andrej Kramarić	TSG Hoffenheim	15
8	(Nigeria) Victor Boniface	Bayer Leverkusen	14
8	(Slovenia) Benjamin Šeško	RB Leipzig	14
10	(Netherlands) Donyell Malen	Borussia Dortmund	13

=== Hat-tricks ===
Player	Club	Against	Result	Date
(Germany) Kevin Behrens	Union Berlin	Mainz 05	4–1 (H)	20 August 2023
(Guinea) Serhou Guirassy	VfB Stuttgart	Mainz 05	3–1 (A)	16 September 2023
(England) Harry Kane	Bayern Munich	VfL Bochum	7–0 (H)	23 September 2023
(Guinea) Serhou Guirassy	VfB Stuttgart	VfL Wolfsburg	3–1 (H)	7 October 2023
(England) Harry Kane	Bayern Munich	Darmstadt 98	8–0 (H)	28 October 2023
(England) Harry Kane	Bayern Munich	Borussia Dortmund	4–0 (A)	4 November 2023
(Czech Republic) Patrik Schick	Bayer Leverkusen	VfL Bochum	4–0 (H)	20 December 2023
(Germany) Deniz Undav	VfB Stuttgart	RB Leipzig	5–2 (H)	27 January 2024
(Germany) Niclas Füllkrug	Borussia Dortmund	VfL Bochum	3–1 (H)	28 January 2024
(England) Harry Kane	Bayern Munich	Mainz 05	8–1 (H)	9 March 2024
(Germany) Florian Wirtz	Bayer Leverkusen	Werder Bremen	5–0 (H)	14 April 2024
(Germany) Robin Hack	Borussia Mönchengladbach	TSG Hoffenheim	3–4 (A)	20 April 2024
(Croatia) Andrej Kramarić	TSG Hoffenheim	Bayern Munich	4–2 (H)	18 May 2024

=== Clean sheets ===
Rank	Player	Club	Clean sheets
1	(Finland) Lukas Hradecky	Bayer Leverkusen	15
2	(Germany) Alexander Nübel	VfB Stuttgart	11
3	(Germany) Noah Atubolu	SC Freiburg	10
4	(Switzerland) Gregor Kobel	Borussia Dortmund	7
4	(Denmark) Frederik Rønnow	Union Berlin	7
4	(Germany) Kevin Trapp	Eintracht Frankfurt	7
4	(Germany) Robin Zentner	Mainz 05	7
8	(Germany) Kevin Müller	1. FC Heidenheim	6
8	(Germany) Manuel Neuer	Bayern Munich	6
8	(Germany) Michael Zetterer	Werder Bremen	6

== Awards ==
=== Monthly awards ===
Month	Player of the Month		Rookie of the Month		Goal of the Month		Ref.
Month	Player	Club	Player	Club	Player	Club	Ref.
August	(Nigeria) Victor Boniface	Bayer Leverkusen	(Nigeria) Victor Boniface	Bayer Leverkusen	(Germany) Jan-Niklas Beste	1. FC Heidenheim	
September	(Guinea) Serhou Guirassy	VfB Stuttgart	(Nigeria) Victor Boniface	Bayer Leverkusen	(Netherlands) Xavi Simons	RB Leipzig	
October	(Germany) Florian Wirtz	Bayer Leverkusen	(Nigeria) Victor Boniface	Bayer Leverkusen	(England) Harry Kane	Bayern Munich	
November	(Germany) Deniz Undav	VfB Stuttgart	(Nigeria) Victor Boniface	Bayer Leverkusen	(England) Harry Kane	Bayern Munich	
December	(Germany) Florian Wirtz	Bayer Leverkusen	(Netherlands) Xavi Simons	RB Leipzig	(England) Harry Kane	Bayern Munich	
January	(Germany) Deniz Undav	VfB Stuttgart	(Netherlands) Ian Maatsen	Borussia Dortmund	(Netherlands) Xavi Simons	RB Leipzig	
February	(Germany) Florian Wirtz	Bayer Leverkusen	(Germany) Maximilian Beier	TSG Hoffenheim	(England) Harry Kane	Bayern Munich	
March	(Guinea) Serhou Guirassy	VfB Stuttgart	(Germany) Maximilian Beier	TSG Hoffenheim	(Germany) Jamal Musiala	Bayern Munich	
April	(Spain) Álex Grimaldo	Bayer Leverkusen	(Netherlands) Xavi Simons	RB Leipzig	(England) Harry Kane	Bayern Munich	
May	—N/a		—N/a		(Germany) Marco Reus	Borussia Dortmund	

=== Annual awards ===
Award	Winner	Club	Ref.
Player of the Season	(Germany) Florian Wirtz	Bayer Leverkusen	
Rookie of the Season	(Nigeria) Victor Boniface	Bayer Leverkusen	
Goal of the Season	(England) Harry Kane	Bayern Munich	

=== Team of the season ===
==== kicker ====
Pos.	Player	Club	Ref.
GK	(Switzerland) Gregor Kobel	Borussia Dortmund	
DF	(Netherlands) Jeremie Frimpong	Bayer Leverkusen	
DF	(Germany) Waldemar Anton	VfB Stuttgart	
DF	(Germany) Jonathan Tah	Bayer Leverkusen	
DF	(Spain) Álex Grimaldo	Bayer Leverkusen	
MF	(Germany) Florian Wirtz	Bayer Leverkusen	
MF	(Argentina) Exequiel Palacios	Bayer Leverkusen	
MF	(Switzerland) Granit Xhaka	Bayer Leverkusen	
MF	(Germany) Jan-Niklas Beste	1. FC Heidenheim	
FW	(Guinea) Serhou Guirassy	VfB Stuttgart	
FW	(England) Harry Kane	Bayern Munich	

==== EA Sports ====
Pos.	Player	Club	Ref.
GK	(Switzerland) Gregor Kobel	Borussia Dortmund	
DF	(Netherlands) Jeremie Frimpong	Bayer Leverkusen	
DF	(Germany) Jonathan Tah	Bayer Leverkusen	
DF	(Germany) Waldemar Anton	VfB Stuttgart	
DF	(Spain) Álex Grimaldo	Bayer Leverkusen	
MF	(Germany) Jamal Musiala	Bayern Munich	
MF	(Switzerland) Granit Xhaka	Bayer Leverkusen	
MF	(Germany) Florian Wirtz	Bayer Leverkusen	
FW	(Guinea) Serhou Guirassy	VfB Stuttgart	
FW	(England) Harry Kane	Bayern Munich	
FW	(Nigeria) Victor Boniface	Bayer Leverkusen	

== Attendances ==
Borussia Dortmund drew the highest average home attendance in the 2023–24 Bundesliga.

Rank	Team	Home games	Average attendance
1	Borussia Dortmund	17	81,305
2	Bayern Munich	17	75,000
3	Eintracht Frankfurt	17	56,900
4	VfB Stuttgart	17	55,118
5	Borussia Mönchengladbach	17	51,371
6	1. FC Köln	17	49,829
7	RB Leipzig	17	44,634
8	Werder Bremen	17	41,721
9	SC Freiburg	17	34,196
10	Mainz 05	17	30,690
11	Bayer Leverkusen	17	29,994
12	FC Augsburg	17	29,144
13	VfL Wolfsburg	17	25,546
14	VfL Bochum	17	25,393
15	TSG Hoffenheim	17	24,559
16	Union Berlin	17	21,829
17	Darmstadt 98	17	17,730
18	1. FC Heidenheim	17	15,000
