= Christian Rasmussen (footballer) =

Danish footballer (born 2003)

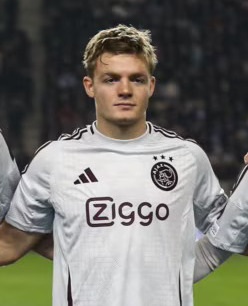
- Rasmussen with Ajax in 2024

Personal information
- Full name: Christian Theodor Kjelder Rasmussen
- Date of birth: 19 January 2003 (age 23)
- Place of birth: Lyngby, Denmark
- Height: 1.84 m (6 ft 0 in)
- Position: Forward

Team information
- Current team: VfL Bochum
- Number: 7

Youth career
- 2015–2019: Nordsjælland
- 2019–2020: Ajax

Senior career*
Years	Team	Apps	(Gls)
2020–2025	Jong Ajax	82	(16)
2022–2025	Ajax	12	(1)
2023–2024	→ Nordsjælland (loan)	22	(0)
2025–2026	Fortuna Düsseldorf	23	(2)
2026–	VfL Bochum	3	(0)

International career^{‡}
2018–2019	Denmark U-16	7	(3)
2019–2020	Denmark U-17	7	(2)
2020–2022	Denmark U-19	11	(2)
2023–2024	Denmark U-21	8	(1)
- * Club domestic league appearances and goals as of 28 August 2026 ‡ National team caps and goals as of 20:34, 29 June 2024 (UTC)

Christian Theodor Kjelder Rasmussen (born 19 January 2003) is a Danish professional footballer who plays as a forward for German 2. Bundesliga club VfL Bochum.

== Club career ==
=== AFC Ajax ===
Rasmussen is a youth product of FC Nordsjælland, having joined the club as a U12 player. On 6 February 2019, Rasmussen signed a contract with Ajax to join their youth academy. He made his professional debut with the reserve team, Jong Ajax, as a late substitute in a 4–0 Eerste Divisie loss to Roda on 30 August 2020. Rasmussen developed into a key player for Jong Ajax over the following seasons, showing increasing goalscoring threat with 7 goals in the 2021–22 season and 9 goals in the 2022–23 season. In total, he made 82 appearances for Jong Ajax, scoring 16 goals.

Rasmussen made his Eredivisie debut for the senior squad of Ajax on 8 January 2023, coming on as a substitute in a 1–1 draw away to NEC. He made one further appearance that season.

==== Loan to FC Nordsjælland ====
On 1 September 2023, Rasmussen returned to his first club FC Nordsjælland on a season-long loan for the 2023–24 season, with the Danish club securing an option to buy. While he did not score in 21 league appearances, Rasmussen was prolific in cup competitions, scoring 3 goals in 4 Danish Cup matches and 3 goals in 7 UEFA Europa Conference League appearances. At the end of the season, Nordsjælland did not exercise their option to buy, and Rasmussen returned to Ajax.

==== Return to Ajax ====
For the 2024–25 season, Rasmussen became part of the first-team squad under new manager Francesco Farioli, primarily used as a rotation player and substitute, often on the wing. He scored his first Eredivisie goal for Ajax during this season. He also scored his first UEFA Europa League goal in an away match against Slavia Prague on 3 October 2024. By mid-February 2025, he had made 20 appearances and scored 2 goals across all competitions for Ajax.

=== Fortuna Düsseldorf ===
On 9 July 2025, Rasmussen signed with German club Fortuna Düsseldorf.

=== VfL Bochum ===
On 8 July 2026, Rasmussen moved to VfL Bochum in 2. Bundesliga on a four-year deal.

== International career ==
Rasmussen has represented Denmark at various youth international levels. He played for the Denmark U16 team, scoring 3 goals in 7 appearances, before moving up to the U17 level where he scored twice in 7 games. He subsequently earned 11 caps for the U19 team, scoring 2 goals.

He made his debut for the Denmark U21 team on 16 June 2023. As of June 2024, he had earned 8 caps and scored 1 goal for the U21 side.

== Career statistics ==
=== Club ===
As of match played 28 August 2025

Appearances and goals by club, season and competition
Club	Season	League			National cup (Note: Includes KNVB Cup, Danish Cup)		Europe		Total	
Club	Season	Division	Apps	Goals	Apps	Goals	Apps	Goals	Apps	Goals
Jong Ajax	2020–21	Eerste Divisie	16	0	—		—		16	0
Jong Ajax	2021–22	Eerste Divisie	36	7	—		—		36	7
Jong Ajax	2022–23	Eerste Divisie	29	9	—		—		29	9
Jong Ajax	2023–24	Eerste Divisie	1	0	—		—		1	0
Jong Ajax	Total		82	16	—		—		82	16
Ajax	2022–23	Eredivisie	2	0	0	0	0	0	2	0
Ajax	2024–25	Eredivisie	10	1	1	0	10 (Note: Appearances in UEFA Europa League)	1	21	2
Ajax	Total		12	1	1	0	10	1	23	2
Nordsjælland (loan)	2023–24	Danish Superliga	21	0	4	3	7 (Note: Appearances in UEFA Europa Conference League)	3	32	6
Fortuna Düsseldorf	2025–26	2. Bundesliga	23	2	2	0	—		25	2
VfL Bochum	2026–27	2. Bundesliga	3	0	1	1	—		4	1
Career total			141	19	8	4	17	4	166	27
