= Jordi Paulina =

Footballer (born 2004)

Personal information
- Full name: Jordi Leander Paulina
- Date of birth: 23 September 2004 (age 22)
- Place of birth: Odijk, Netherlands
- Height: 1.91 m (6 ft 3 in)
- Position: Forward

Team information
- Current team: Fortuna Düsseldorf
- Number: 27

Youth career
- VV Jonathan
- 2016–2021: Utrecht
- 2021–2022: USV Hercules

Senior career*
Years	Team	Apps	(Gls)
2022–2024	USV Hercules	44	(11)
2024–2026	Borussia Dortmund II	40	(12)
2024	Borussia Dortmund	0	(0)
2026–	Fortuna Düsseldorf	10	(0)

International career^{‡}
2025–	Curaçao	5	(4)
- * Club domestic league appearances and goals as of 15 August 2026 ‡ National team caps and goals as of 4 October 2026

Jordi Leander Paulina (born 23 September 2004) is a professional footballer who plays as a forward for German 3. Liga club Fortuna Düsseldorf. Born in the Netherlands, he plays for the Curaçao national team.

== Club career ==
Paulina is a youth product of the academies of vv Jonathan, Utrecht and USV Hercules. In August 2022, he debuted with the senior USV Hercules side in the KNVB Cup. He was definitively promoted to the senior USV Hercules side in the winter of the 2022–2023 season, and was a definitive starter the following season 2023–24. On 21 December 2023, he was part of a high-profile 3–2 win over Eredivisie side Ajax in the second round of the KNVB Cup where he assisted a goal.

On 15 May 2024, it was announced that Paulina would transfer to Borussia Dortmund at the end of the season on a contract until 2027. He was originally assigned to their reserves in the 3. Liga. On 29 October 2024, he debuted with the senior Borussia Dormund side as a substitute in a 1–0 DFB Cup loss to VfL Wolfsburg.

On 3 January 2026, Paulina signed a four-and-a-half-year contract with Fortuna Düsseldorf.

== International career ==
In November 2025, Paulina received his first call-up to the Curaçao national team for the FIFA World Cup qualifiers. He made his international debut on 13 November by scoring two goals in a 7–0 win over Bermuda.

== Personal life ==
Born in the Netherlands, Paulina is of Curaçaoan descent.

== Career statistics ==
=== Club ===
As of match played 15 August 2026

Appearances and goals by club, season and competition
Club	Season	League			National cup		Europe		Other		Total	
Club	Season	Division	Apps	Goals	Apps	Goals	Apps	Goals	Apps	Goals	Apps	Goals
USV Hercules	2022–23	Derde Divisie	12	1	1	0	—		4 (Note: Apeparances in promotion play-offs)	0	17	1
USV Hercules	2023–24	Derde Divisie	32	10	5	0	—		1	0	38	10
USV Hercules	Total		44	11	6	0	—		5	0	55	11
Borussia Dortmund II	2024–25	3. Liga	29	5	—		—		—		29	5
Borussia Dortmund II	2025–26s	3. Liga	11	7	—		—		—		11	7
Borussia Dortmund II	Total		40	12	—		—		—		40	12
Borussia Dortmund	2024–25	Bundesliga	0	0	1	0	0	0	—		1	0
Fortuna Düsseldorf	2025–26	2. Bundesliga	8	0	—		—		—		8	0
Fortuna Düsseldorf	2026–27	3. Liga	2	0	1	0	—		—		3	0
Fortuna Düsseldorf	Total		10	0	1	0	—		—		11	0
Career total			94	23	8	0	0	0	5	0	107	23

=== International ===
As of match played 4 October 2026

Appearances and goals by national team and year
National team	Year	Apps	Goals
Curaçao	2025	5	4
Total		5	4

Scores and results list Curaçao's goal tally first, score column indicates score after each Paulina goal.

List of international goals scored by Jordi Paulina
No.	Date	Venue	Opponent	Score	Result	Competition
1	13 November 2025	Bermuda National Stadium, Devonshire Parish, Bermuda	Bermuda	3–0	7–0	2026 FIFA World Cup qualification
2	13 November 2025	Bermuda National Stadium, Devonshire Parish, Bermuda	Bermuda	5–0	7–0	2026 FIFA World Cup qualification
3	24 September 2026	Ricardo Saprissa Aymá, San José, Costa Rica	Costa Rica	4–3	4–3	2026–27 CONCACAF Nations League A
4	4 October 2026	Hasely Crawford Stadium, Port of Spain, Trinidad and Tobago	Trinidad and Tobago	1–1	1–1	2026–27 CONCACAF Nations League A
