= Jamil Siebert =

German footballer (born 2002)

Personal information
- Date of birth: 2 April 2002 (age 24)
- Place of birth: Düsseldorf, Germany
- Height: 1.93 m (6 ft 4 in)
- Position: Centre-back

Team information
- Current team: Lecce
- Number: 5

Youth career
- –2010: Düsseldorfer SC 99
- 2010–2020: Fortuna Düsseldorf

Senior career*
Years	Team	Apps	(Gls)
2020–2025	Fortuna Düsseldorf	49	(1)
2020–2024	Fortuna Düsseldorf II	26	(1)
2022–2023	→ Viktoria Köln (loan)	43	(2)
2025–	Lecce	28	(2)

International career^{‡}
2019	Germany U18	1	(0)
2021–2023	Germany U20	8	(0)
2023–2025	Germany U21	8	(0)
Medal record
Men's football
Representing Germany
UEFA European Under-21 Championship
Runner-up	2025 Slovakia
- * Club domestic league appearances and goals as of 15:14, 18 October 2026 (UTC) ‡ National team caps and goals as of 11:53, 27 June 2025 (UTC)

Jamil Siebert (born 2 April 2002) is a German professional footballer who plays as a centre-back for Serie A club Lecce.

== Club career ==
Siebert made his professional debut for Fortuna Düsseldorf on 26 September 2020, coming on as a substitute in second-half stoppage time of the team's 1–0 home win against Würzburger Kickers.

On 31 January 2022, Siebert joined Viktoria Köln on loan until the end of the season. The loan was extended for the 2022–23 season.

On 22 August 2025, Siebert signed a three-season contract with Lecce in Italy.

He scored his first goal for Lecce against Napoli at the Diego Maradona Stadium on 14 March 2026.

== Personal life ==
Siebert was born in Germany to a German father and Malagasy mother.

== Career statistics ==
As of match played 18 October 2026

Appearances and goals by club, season and competition
Club	Season	League			DFB-Pokal		Other		Total	
Club	Season	Division	Apps	Goals	Apps	Goals	Apps	Goals	Apps	Goals
Fortuna Düsseldorf	2020–21	2. Bundesliga	2	0	0	0	—		2	0
Fortuna Düsseldorf	2021–22	2. Bundesliga	0	0	0	0	—		0	0
Fortuna Düsseldorf	2023–24	2. Bundesliga	24	1	4	0	—		28	1
Fortuna Düsseldorf	2024–25	2. Bundesliga	21	0	0	0	—		21	0
Fortuna Düsseldorf	2025–26	2. Bundesliga	2	0	1	0	—		3	0
Fortuna Düsseldorf	Total		49	1	5	0	0	0	54	1
Fortuna Düsseldorf II	2020–21	Regionalliga West	12	0	—		—		12	0
Fortuna Düsseldorf II	2021–22	Regionalliga West	11	0	—		—		11	0
Fortuna Düsseldorf II	2024–25	Regionalliga West	3	0	—		—		3	0
Fortuna Düsseldorf II	Total		26	0	—		—		26	0
Viktoria Köln (loan)	2021–22	3. Liga	13	0	0	0	—		13	0
Viktoria Köln (loan)	2022–23	3. Liga	30	2	1	0	—		31	2
Viktoria Köln (loan)	Total		43	2	1	0	—		44	2
Lecce	2025–26	Serie A	21	1	1	0	—		22	1
Lecce	2026–27	Serie A	7	1	0	0	—		7	1
Lecce	Total		28	2	1	0	—		29	2
Career total			146	5	7	0	0	0	153	5

== Honours ==
Germany U21

- UEFA European Under-21 Championship runner-up: 2025
