= Friedrich Müller =

Friedrich Müller may refer to:

- Maler Müller (Friedrich Müller, 1749–1825), German painter and poet
- Fritz Müller (doctor) (Friedrich Müller, 1834–1895), Swiss doctor, zoologist, and herpetologist
- Friedrich Christoph Müller (1751–1808), theologian and cartographer in Schwelm
- Max Müller (Friedrich Maximillian Müller, 1823–1900), German-British philologist and indologist known for his work on Sanskrit and Hinduism
- Friedrich Konrad Müller (1823–1881), German poet, journalist and physician
- Friedrich Müller (linguist) (1834–1898), Austrian linguist, known for his work on African languages
- Friedrich von Müller (1858–1941), German physician
- Friedrich W. K. Müller (1863–1930), German scholar of oriental cultures and languages, known for his work on Tocharian and Sogdian
- Friedrich Mueller, also known as Eugen Sandow (1867–1925), German bodybuilder
- Friedrich-Wilhelm Müller (1897-1947), German World War II General
- Friedrich Müller (footballer) (1907–1978), German international footballer of the 1930s
- Friedrich-Karl "Tutti" Müller (1916–1944), German World War II fighter pilot
