= Jordy de Wijs =

Dutch footballer (born 1995)

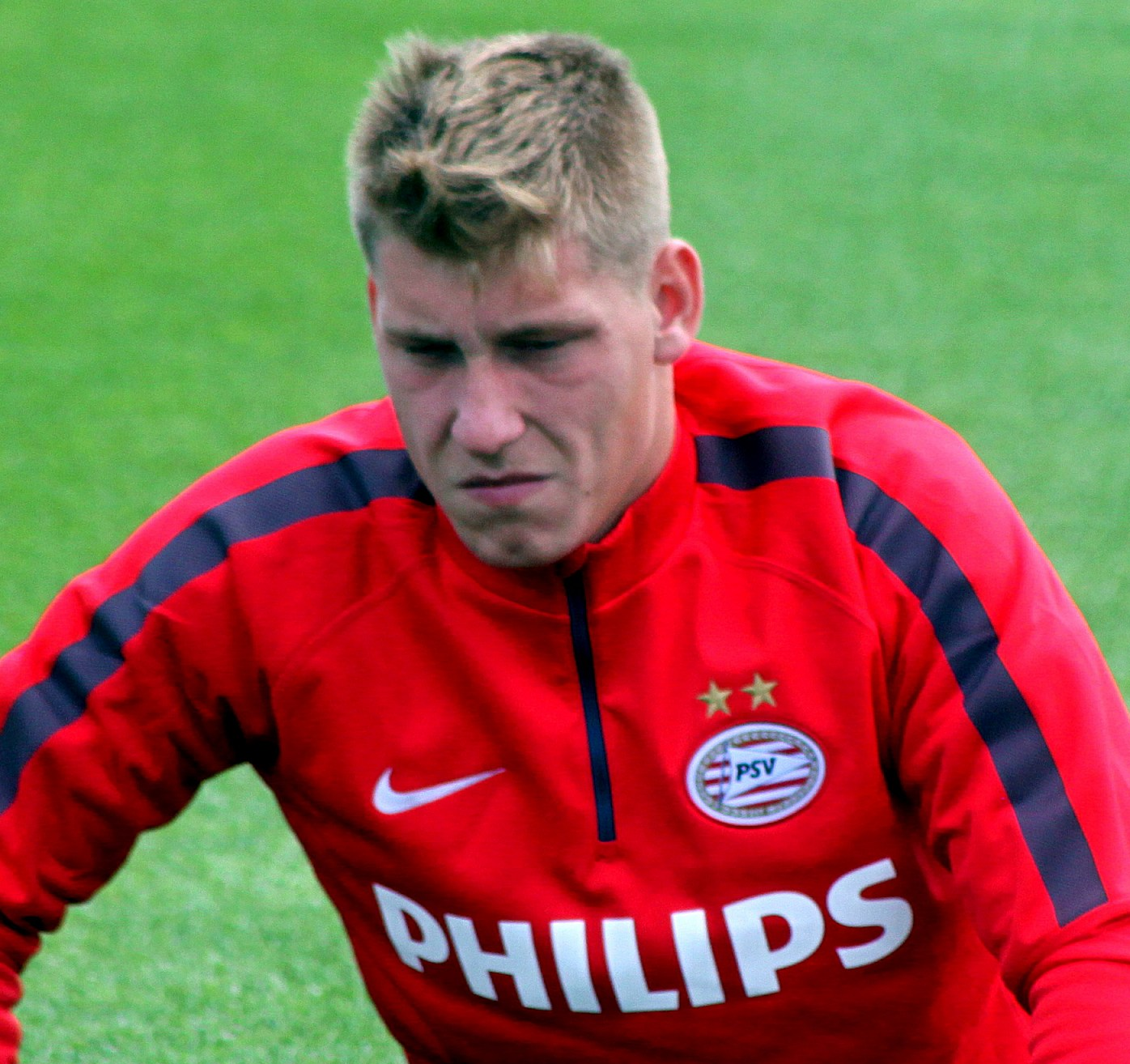
- De Wijs training with PSV in 2014

Personal information
- Full name: Jordy Adriana Jozefina de Wijs
- Date of birth: 8 January 1995 (age 31)
- Place of birth: Kortrijk, Belgium
- Height: 1.89 m (6 ft 2 in)
- Position: Centre-back

Team information
- Current team: RKC Waalwijk
- Number: 30

Youth career
- Vlijmense Boys
- RKC Waalwijk
- 2005–2014: PSV

Senior career*
Years	Team	Apps	(Gls)
2014–2017	Jong PSV	67	(7)
2014–2018	PSV	2	(0)
2017–2018	→ Excelsior (loan)	34	(0)
2018–2021	Hull City	74	(3)
2021	→ Queens Park Rangers (loan)	9	(1)
2021–2022	Queens Park Rangers	12	(0)
2022	→ Fortuna Düsseldorf (loan)	10	(1)
2022–2026	Fortuna Düsseldorf	60	(4)
2025	→ Heerenveen (loan)	3	(0)
2026–	RKC Waalwijk	0	(0)

International career
2012	Netherlands U17	2	(0)
2012	Netherlands U18	1	(0)
2014	Netherlands U20	3	(1)
2015	Netherlands U21	3	(0)
- * Club domestic league appearances and goals as of 18 May 2026

Jordy Adriana Jozefina de Wijs (born 8 January 1995) is a Dutch professional footballer who plays as a centre-back for Eerste Divisie club RKC Waalwijk.

== Club career ==
=== Jong PSV ===
Jordy de Wijs joined the PSV academy in 2005. In 2008, de Wijs won the title with the PSV D-juniors. In 2013, de Wijs was part of the under-19 team that came from two down to beat Feyenoord 3–2 to win the cup. He made his professional debut as Jong PSV player in the second division on 28 February 2014 against Almere City in a 3–1 away win playing the full game.

=== PSV ===
Throughout May 2014, de Wijs was part of the PSV squad that travelled to South Korea where Ji-Sung Park played his farewell matches. On 4 June 2014, de Wijs signed a new two-year contract with an option of a further year.

On 25 February 2015, de Wijs was called up for the trip to Saint Petersburg where PSV were to face Zenit in a Europa League round of 32 tie. PSV lost 3–0 on the day and 4–0 on aggregate and de Wijs was an unused substitute.

On 9 July 2015, de Wijs was named part of the senior squad that would fly to PSV's pre-season camp in Evians-les-Bains taking part in the Valais Cup. On 15 September 2015, de Wijs was an unused substitute in a 2–1 Champions League group win over Manchester United. On 21 October 2015, he made his senior debut in a Champions League game coming on as a substitute for Simon Poulsen in the 74th minute against Wolfsburg where they lost 2–0. Ten days later, de Wijs made his Eredivisie debut against De Graafschap replacing Héctor Moreno where they won 6–3. On 21 November 2015, de Wijs with teammate Jeroen Zoet signed new deals keeping them at the club until 2019. After impressing at Jong PSV, de Wijs was called up for the first-team by manager Phillip Cocu on 3 December 2015.

On 23 November 2016, de Wijs came on as a substitute at half-time replacing Jetro Willems in a Champions League match against Atlético Madrid where they lost 2–0.

==== Excelsior (loan) ====
On 15 January 2017, de Wijs joined fellow Eredivisie team Excelsior until the end of the season. On 19 March 2017, de Wijs suffered a broken wrist in a 1–1 draw against Ajax. He made 15 appearances under Mitchell van der Gaag, 13 of which were for the full 90 minutes.

On 31 August 2017, he rejoined the club on a season-long loan for the 2017–18 season. On 13 February 2018, de Wijs underwent meniscus surgery meaning he would be ruled out for six to eight weeks.

=== Hull City ===
On 11 July 2018, de Wijs signed a three-year contract, with an option of a fourth year, with Hull City for an undisclosed fee. He made his debut in the first match of the 2018–19 season on 6 August 2018 at home to Aston Villa in a 3–1 defeat. He scored a late goal on 10 April 2019 at the KCOM Stadium against Wigan Athletic to secure a 2–1 win.

On 28 September 2019, de Wijs scored a header from a cross by Jarrod Bowen which was his first goal of the campaign in a 2–2 draw with Cardiff. His only other goal of the season was another header in a defeat against Bristol City which ended 2–1. On 17 June 2020, de Wijs was named as captain for rest of the restarted 2019–20 season after captain Eric Lichaj and vice-captain Jackson Irvine both turned down a short-term contract extension.

On 29 November 2020, de Wijs suffered a fractured eye socket in a FA Cup tie against Stevenage where they lost on penalties.

==== Queens Park Rangers (loan) ====
On 14 January 2021, de Wijs moved to Championship club Queens Park Rangers, on a loan with a view to make permanent in the summer. He scored his first goal for QPR, a late winner, in a 3–2 win over Millwall on 17 March 2021. On 13 April 2021, de Wijs suffered a broken nose in a 3–1 loss against Rotherham meaning he was substituted at half-time.

=== Queens Park Rangers ===
On 13 May 2021, following a successful loan spell, de Wijs signed permanently for Queens Park Rangers on a three-year deal.

==== Fortuna Düsseldorf (loan) ====
On 29 January 2022, de Wijs joined 2. Bundesliga side Fortuna Düsseldorf on loan for the remainder of the 2021–22 season.

=== Fortuna Düsseldorf ===
On 21 June 2022, de Wijs moved to Fortuna Düsseldorf on a permanent basis and signed a four-year contract with the club.

==== Heerenveen (loan) ====
On 2 January 2025, de Wijs joined Heerenveen on loan until the end of the season.

=== RKC Waalwijk ===
In the summer of 2026, de Wijs signed a two-year contract with RKC Waalwijk.

== International career ==
De Wijs is a former Dutch youth international. On 29 May 2015, he was handed his Netherlands under-21 debut in a 3–1 defeat to the USA under-21 team in the second game of the Toulon tournament.

== Personal life ==
Jordy's father Edwin de Wijs and grandfather Hans van der Pluijm are both former professional footballers. His father made more than 100 appearances at the top level of Dutch football and his grandfather made over 300 appearances as a goalkeeper for Dutch club Den Bosch.

== Career statistics ==
As of match played 30 August 2024

Appearances and goals by club, season and competition
Club	Season	League			National cup (Note: Includes KNVB Cup, FA Cup, DFB-Pokal)		League cup (Note: Includes EFL Cup)		Other		Total	
Club	Season	Division	Apps	Goals	Apps	Goals	Apps	Goals	Apps	Goals	Apps	Goals
Jong PSV	2013–14	Eerste Divisie	7	0	—		—		—		7	0
Jong PSV	2014–15	Eerste Divisie	25	1	—		—		—		25	1
Jong PSV	2015–16	Eerste Divisie	21	3	—		—		—		21	3
Jong PSV	2016–17	Eerste Divisie	12	2	—		—		—		12	2
Jong PSV	2017–18	Eerste Divisie	2	1	—		—		—		2	1
Jong PSV	Total		67	7	—		—		—		67	7
PSV	2014–15	Eredivisie	0	0	0	0	—		0	0	0	0
PSV	2015–16	Eredivisie	1	0	1	0	—		1 (Note: Appearance in UEFA Champions League)	0	3	0
PSV	2016–17	Eredivisie	0	0	0	0	—		1	0	1	0
PSV	2017–18	Eredivisie	1	0	0	0	—		0	0	1	0
PSV	Total		2	0	1	0	—		2	0	5	0
Excelsior (loan)	2016–17	Eredivisie	15	0	0	0	—		—		15	0
Excelsior (loan)	2017–18	Eredivisie	19	0	1	0	—		—		20	0
Excelsior (loan)	Total		34	0	1	0	—		—		35	0
Hull City	2018–19	Championship	32	1	0	0	0	0	—		32	1
Hull City	2019–20	Championship	35	2	0	0	0	0	—		35	2
Hull City	2020–21	League One	7	0	1	0	1	0	—		9	0
Hull City	Total		74	3	1	0	1	0	—		76	3
Queens Park Rangers (loan)	2020–21	Championship	9	1	0	0	0	0	—		9	1
Queens Park Rangers	2021–22	Championship	12	0	0	0	1	0	—		13	0
Fortuna Düsseldorf (loan)	2021–22	2. Bundesliga	10	1	0	0	—		—		10	1
Fortuna Düsseldorf	2022–23	2. Bundesliga	20	1	1	0	—		—		21	1
Fortuna Düsseldorf	2023–24	2. Bundesliga	28	2	2	0	—		2 (Note: Appearances in Bundesliga promotion play-offs)	0	32	2
Fortuna Düsseldorf	2024–25	2. Bundesliga	3	0	1	0	—		—		4	0
Fortuna Düsseldorf	Total		60	4	4	0	—		2	0	67	4
Career total			258	15	7	0	2	0	4	0	271	15
