= Bunk Henderson =

American baseball player

- Catcher

Negro league baseball debut
- 1925, for the Birmingham Black Barons

Last appearance
- 1925, for the Birmingham Black Barons

Teams
- Birmingham Black Barons (1925)

Bunk Henderson was an American Negro league catcher in the 1920s.

Henderson played for the Birmingham Black Barons in 1925. In five recorded games, he posted one hit in 12 plate appearances.
