= Tim Rossmann =

German footballer (born 2003)

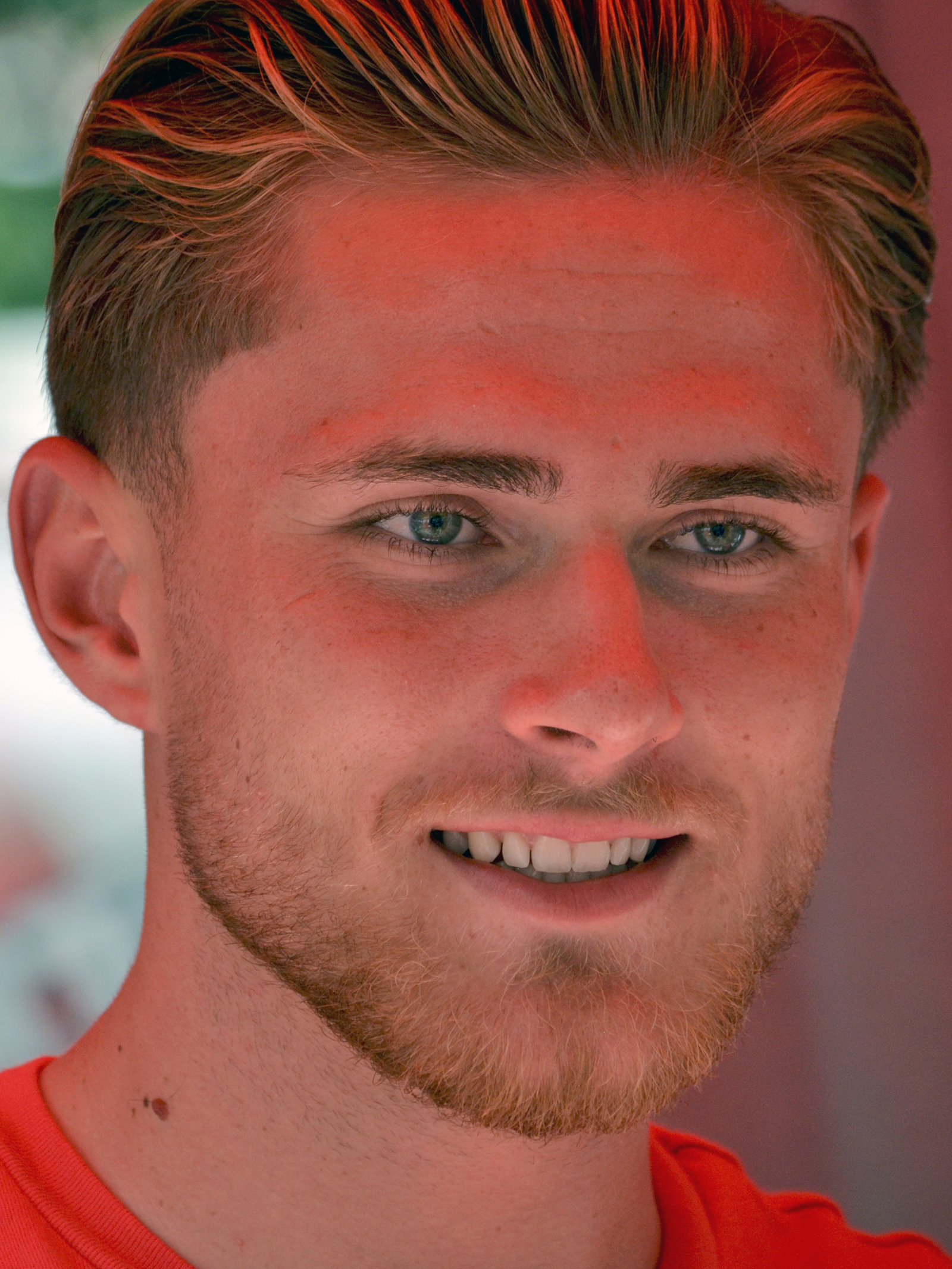

Personal information
- Date of birth: 11 November 2003 (age 22)
- Place of birth: Bietigheim-Bissingen, Germany
- Height: 1.83 m (6 ft 0 in)
- Position: Forward

Team information
- Current team: Sonnenhof Großaspach
- Number: 11

Youth career
- –2019: FSV 08 Bietigheim-Bissingen
- 2019–2022: Karlsruher SC

Senior career*
Years	Team	Apps	(Gls)
2022–2024	Karlsruher SC	18	(0)
2024–2026	Fortuna Düsseldorf	22	(2)
2026–	Sonnenhof Großaspach	0	(0)

International career^{‡}
2022	Germany U19	1	(0)
2023	Germany U20	2	(0)
- * Club domestic league appearances and goals as of 18 May 2026 ‡ National team caps and goals as of 17:25, 25 August 2024 (UTC)

Tim Rossmann (born 11 November 2003) is a German professional footballer who plays as a forward for 3. Liga club Sonnenhof Großaspach.

== Career ==
Born in Bietigheim-Bissingen, Rossmann played youth football for FSV 08 Bietigheim-Bissingen, where his father is a board member, before joining Karlsruher SC's academy in 2019. He made his first-team debut for the club as a substitute in their final match of the 2021–22 season against 1. FC Heidenheim.

Rossmann started Karlsruhe's opening match of the 2022–23 season, a 5–0 defeat away to SC Paderborn but after 5 league appearances, he suffered a hip injury in November that required surgery. He returned to the club's first team in February 2023 and made a further 8 appearances that season.

Rossmann appeared in Karlsruhe's first four league matches of the 2023–24 season, but did not appear again that season due to a muscle tear and persistent hip problems. In January 2024, it was announced that Rossmann would join Fortuna Düsseldorf at the end of the season, upon the expiry of his Karlsruhe contract.

Rossmann made his debut for Düsseldorf in their opening 2. Bundesliga match of the 2024–25 season, scoring his first goal in senior football after coming on as an 85th-minute substitute in a 2–0 win over Darmstadt 98.

== International career ==
Rossmann has represented Germany at under-19 and under-20 international level.

== Career statistics ==
As of match played 25 August 2024

Appearances and goals by club, season and competition
Club	Season	League			DFB-Pokal		Other		Total	
Club	Season	Division	Apps	Goals	Apps	Goals	Apps	Goals	Apps	Goals
Karlsruher SC	2021–22	2. Bundesliga	1	0	0	0	—		1	0
Karlsruher SC	2022–23	2. Bundesliga	13	0	0	0	—		13	0
Karlsruher SC	2023–24	2. Bundesliga	4	0	1	0	—		5	0
Karlsruher SC	Total		18	0	1	0	0	0	19	0
Fortuna Düsseldorf	2024–25	2. Bundesliga	3	1	1	0	—		4	1
Career total			21	1	2	0	0	0	23	1
