= Anouar El Azzouzi =

Moroccan footballer (born 2001)

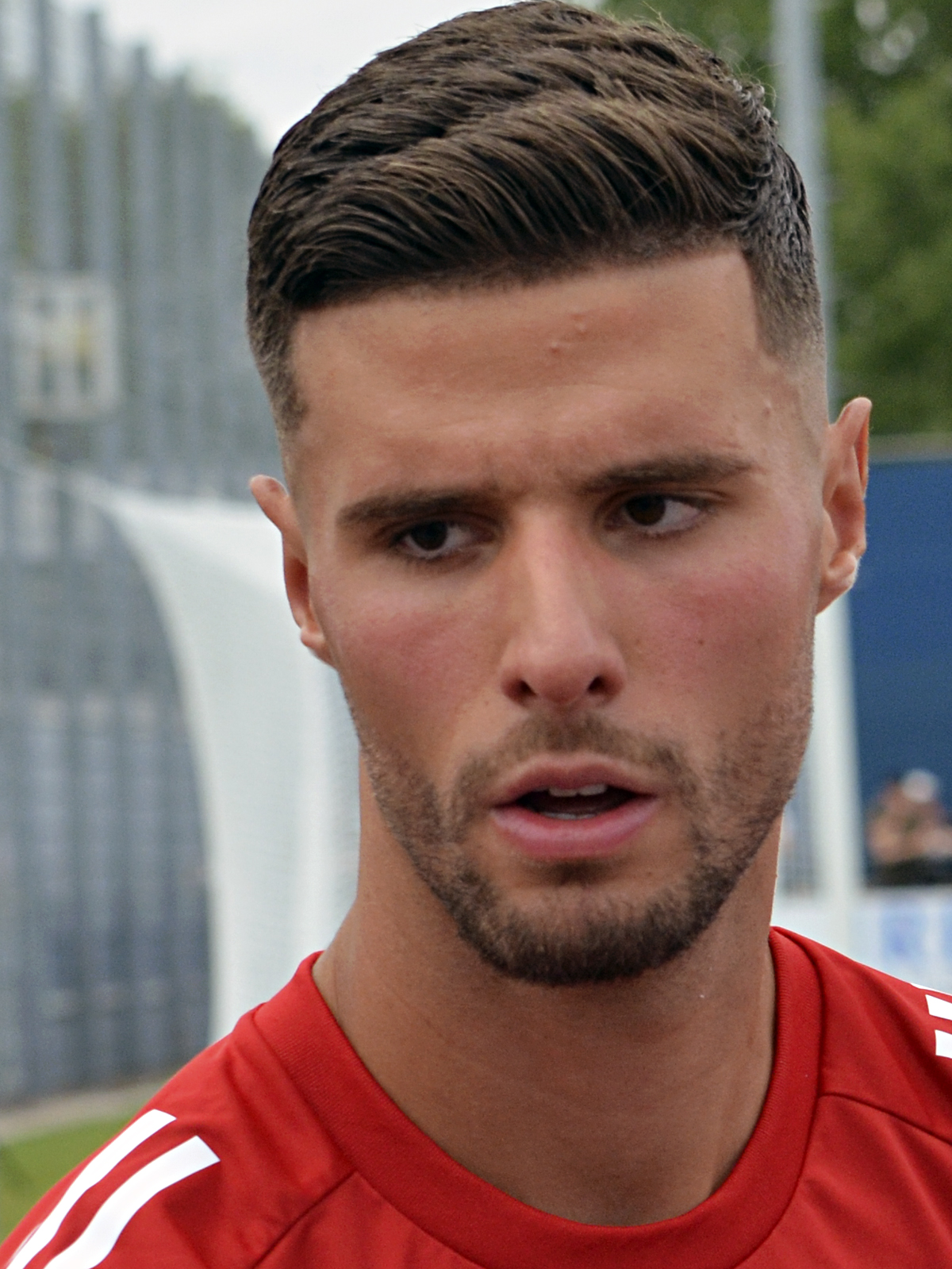
- El Azzouzi in 2025

Personal information
- Date of birth: 29 May 2001 (age 25)
- Place of birth: Veenendaal, Netherlands
- Height: 1.87 m (6 ft 2 in)
- Position: Centre-back

Team information
- Current team: Frosinone
- Number: 34

Youth career
- VRC Veenendaal
- 2011–2018: Vitesse

Senior career*
Years	Team	Apps	(Gls)
2018–2019	Vitesse II	1	(0)
2019–2020	N.E.C.	0	(0)
2021–2023	Dordrecht	64	(5)
2023–2025	PEC Zwolle	55	(1)
2025–2026	Fortuna Düsseldorf	29	(1)
2026–	Frosinone	2	(0)

International career^{‡}
2020	Morocco U20	1	(0)
- * Club domestic league appearances and goals as of 29 October 2026 ‡ National team caps and goals as of 1 March 2020

Anouar El Azzouzi (Arabic: انور العزوزى; born 29 May 2001) is a professional footballer who plays as a centre-back for Serie A club Frosinone. Born in the Netherlands, he is a youth international for Morocco.

== Club career ==
El Azzouzi is a youth product of his local club VRC Veenendaal and Vitesse. He began his senior career with the reserves of Vitesse in 2018. He spent the 2019–20 season with the reserves of NEC Nijmegen, but left after a disagreement with the technical leadership in December 2020. On 2 August 2021, El Azzouzi transferred to Dordrecht where he was initially assigned to the reserves. On 2 February 2022, he signed a professional contract with the club.

On 10 July 2023, El Azzouzi signed a contract with PEC Zwolle for three seasons, with an optional fourth year.

On 26 June 2025, El Azzouzi moved to German club Fortuna Düsseldorf in the 2. Bundesliga.

On 13 July 2026, El Azzouzi signed a three-year contract with Frosinone in Italy.

== International career ==
Born in the Netherlands, El Azzouzi is of Moroccan descent. He was called up to a training camp for the Netherlands U18s in 2018. He is a youth international for Morocco, having played for the Morocco U20s in 2020.

== Personal life ==
El Azzouzi is the twin brother of the footballer Oussama El Azzouzi.
