= Daniel Bunk =

German footballer (Born 2004)

Personal information
- Date of birth: 25 March 2004 (age 22)
- Place of birth: Wuppertal, Germany
- Height: 1.70 m (5 ft 7 in)
- Position: Midfielder

Youth career
- –2012: Fortuna Wuppertal
- 2012–2022: Fortuna Düsseldorf

Senior career*
Years	Team	Apps	(Gls)
2022–2025	Fortuna Düsseldorf	2	(0)
2023–2025	Fortuna Düsseldorf II	34	(2)

International career^{‡}
2019	Germany U15	2	(1)
2019	Germany U16	4	(1)
2021	Germany U17	1	(0)
2021	Germany U18	4	(0)
2022–2023	Germany U19	9	(0)
- * Club domestic league appearances and goals as of 23 May 2025 ‡ National team caps and goals as of 29 April 2023

Daniel Bunk (born 25 March 2004) is a German professional footballer who plays as a midfielder.

== Club career ==
After his beginnings in the youth team of Fortuna Wuppertal, Bunk joined the youth academy of Fortuna Düsseldorf in the summer of 2012. After a total of 18 games in the B-Junioren-Bundesliga and 21 games in the A-Junioren-Bundesliga, in which he scored one goal in total, Fortuna Düsseldorf offered Bunk a long-term contract.

On 10 September 2022, Bunk made his professional debut in the 2. Bundesliga when he came on as a substitute for Ao Tanaka in the 90th minute of the game in Fortuna Düsseldorf's 3–1 home win against Hansa Rostock.

== International career ==
Since 2019, Bunk has been capped at all youth international levels for the Germany from under-15 to under-19.
