= Sima Suso =

German footballer (born 2005)

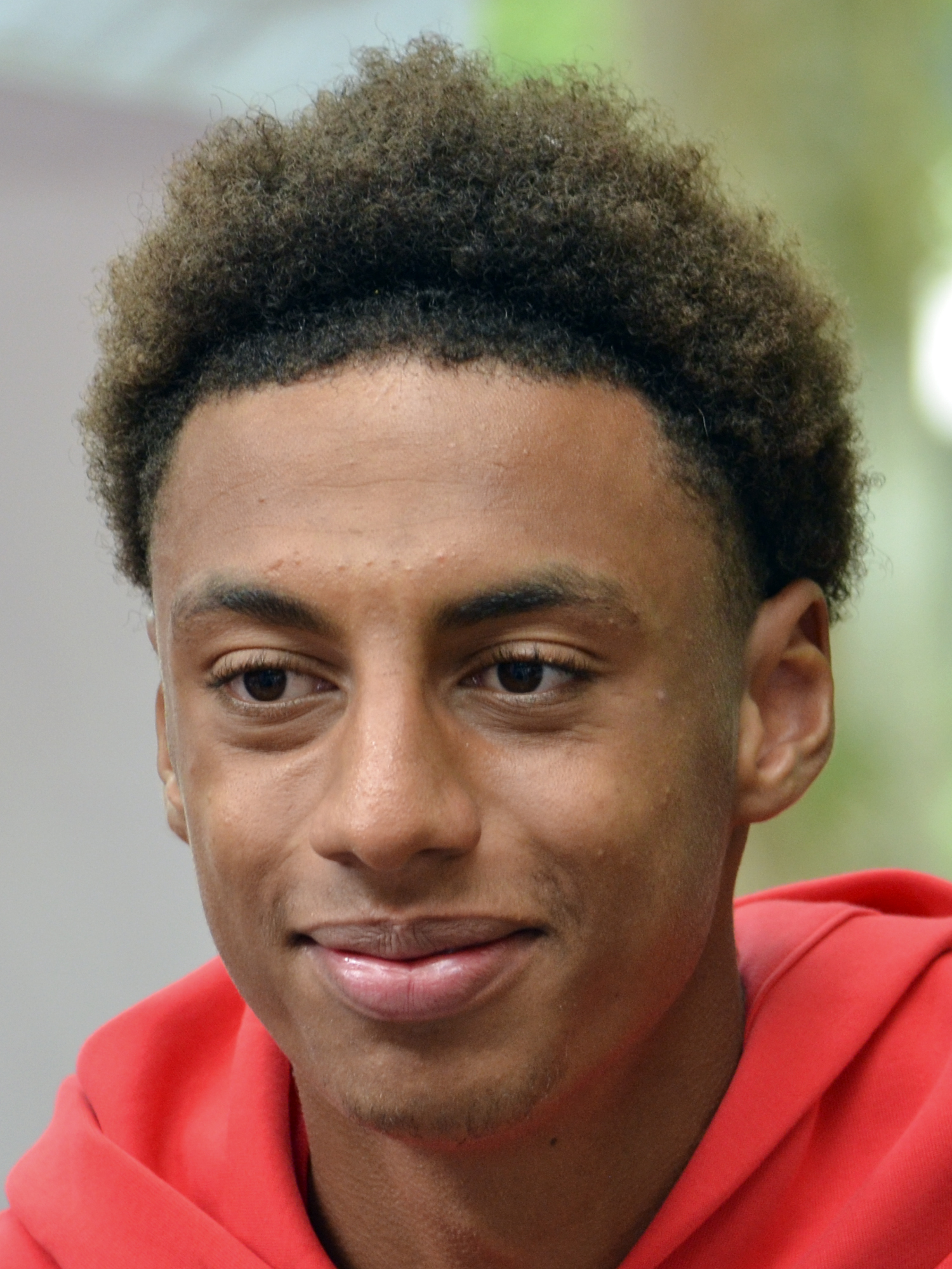
- Suso in 2025

Personal information
- Full name: Klaus Sima Suso
- Date of birth: May 28, 2005 (age 21)
- Place of birth: Bergisch Gladbach, Germany
- Height: 1.90 m (6 ft 3 in)
- Position: Midfielder

Team information
- Current team: FC Augsburg
- Number: 8

Youth career
- SV Bergisch Gladbach
- Bayer Leverkusen
- 2019–2021: Fortuna Köln
- 2021–2022: Dynamo Dresden
- 2022–2023: Fortuna Düsseldorf

Senior career*
Years	Team	Apps	(Gls)
2023–2024	Fortuna Düsseldorf II	19	(3)
2023–2026	Fortuna Düsseldorf	28	(1)
2025	→Hansa Rostock II (loan)	1	(0)
2025	→Hansa Rostock (loan)	11	(0)
2026–	FC Augsburg	0	(0)

International career^{‡}
2023	Germany U18	1	(0)
2023	Germany U19	7	(0)
2025–	Germany U20	4	(0)
- * Club domestic league appearances and goals as of 17:00, 14 July 2026 (UTC) ‡ National team caps and goals as of 17:00, 14 July 2026 (UTC)

Klaus Sima Suso (born 28 May 2005) is a German professional footballer who plays as a midfielder for Bundesliga club FC Augsburg.

== Club career ==
Suso is a product of the youth academy of SV Bergisch Gladbach, Bayer Leverkusen, Fortuna Köln, Dynamo Dresden and Fortuna Düsseldorf.

On 4 September 2023, he signed his first professional contract with Fortuna Düsseldorf. On 31 October 2023, he made his senior and professional debut with Fortuna Düsseldorf as a substitute in a 6–2 DFB-Pokal win over SpVgg Unterhaching on 31 October 2023. On 8 December 2023, he extended his contract with the club.

On 19 January 2025, he joined Hansa Rostock on loan in the 3. Liga for the second half of the 2024–25 season. He returned to Fortuna Düsseldorf for the 2025–26 season, making 30 appearances and scoring 1 goal for the club that season in the 2. Bundesliga.

On 10 July 2026, Suso signed a contract with the Bundesliga club FC Augsburg until 2031.

== International career ==
Born in Germany, Suso is of Gambian descent descent through his father. He is a youth international for Germany, having played for the Germany U20s in 2025.

== Honours ==
Hansa Rostock

- Mecklenburg-Vorpommern Cup: 2025
