= Danny Schmidt (footballer) =

German footballer (born 2003)

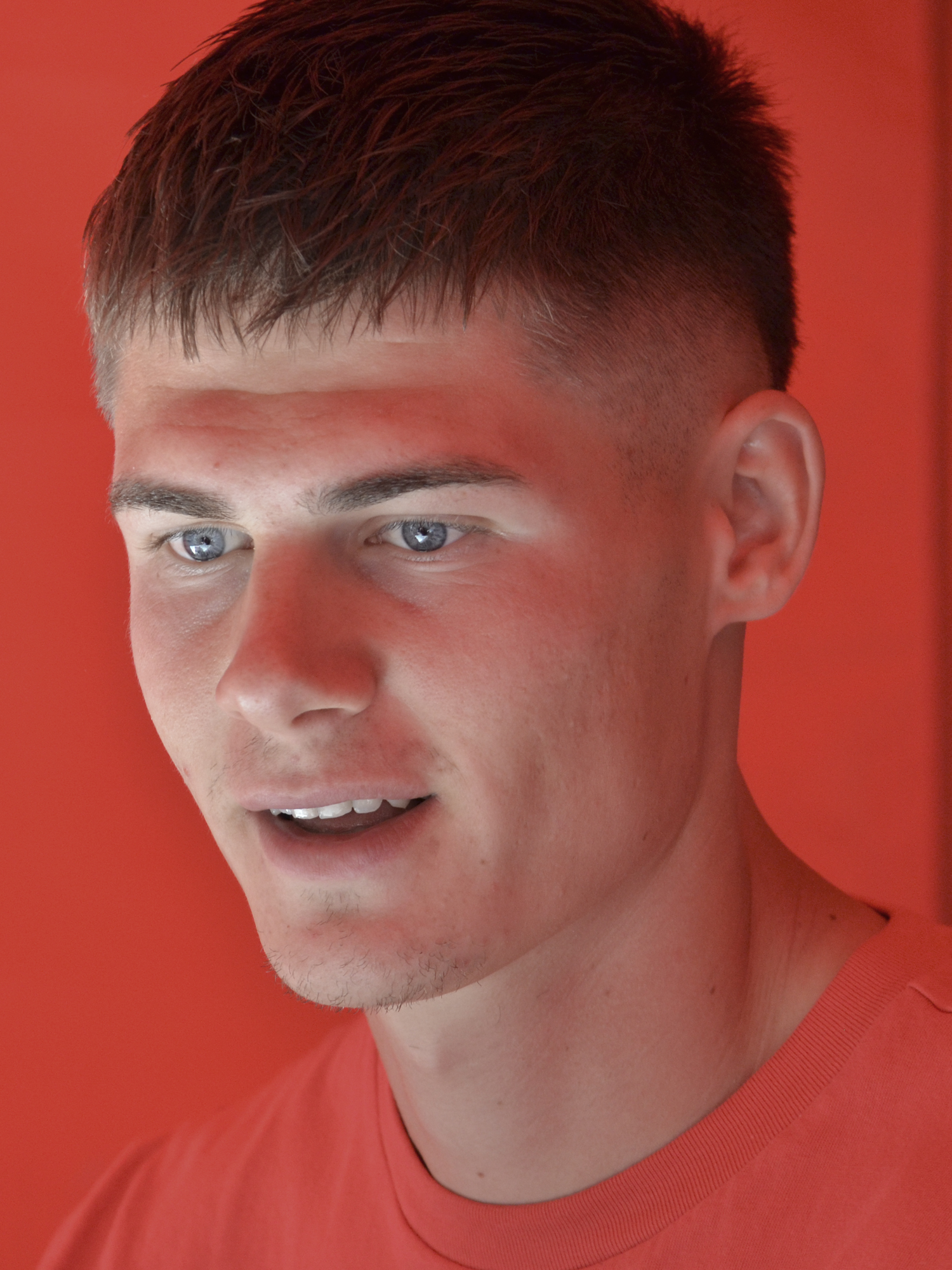
- Schmidt in 2025

Personal information
- Date of birth: 30 January 2003 (age 23)
- Place of birth: Wiesbaden, Germany
- Height: 1.88 m (6 ft 2 in)
- Position: Midfielder

Team information
- Current team: St Johnstone
- Number: 22

Youth career
- –2012: SV Neuhof-Taunusstein
- 2012–2022: 1. FSV Mainz 05

Senior career*
Years	Team	Apps	(Gls)
2022–2024	1. FSV Mainz 05 II	67	(24)
2024–2026	Fortuna Düsseldorf	36	(5)
2026	→ Rot-Weiss Essen (loan)	6	(0)
2026–	St Johnstone	0	(0)

International career
2019	Germany U17	6	(1)
- * Club domestic league appearances and goals as of 20 May 2026

Danny Schmidt (born 30 January 2003) is a German professional footballer who plays as a midfielder for Scottish Premiership club St Johnstone.

== Club career ==
Born in Wiesbaden, Schmidt began his career at SV Neuhof in his home state of Hesse. In 2012, he moved to 1. FSV Mainz 05. In April 2022, when he was the top scorer with 12 goals in 16 games for the under-19 team, he was promoted to the under-23 team in the Regionalliga.

On 29 February 2024, Schmidt signed a deal to move to Fortuna Düsseldorf of the 2. Bundesliga for free once his contract expired on 1 July. He made his debut on 4 August as the season began with a 2–0 win away to SV Darmstadt 98; the Rheinische Post wrote that he had been signed as a prospect, but had earned his starting place by scoring in friendly matches over the summer. Manager Daniel Thioune played him as a centre forward and praised his performance, but doubted whether he would have started in his natural position due to the club's strength there already. In his third game on 25 August, he came on as a substitute and scored a late winner in a 2–1 victory at SSV Ulm 1846.

On 4 January 2026, Schmidt joined Rot-Weiss Essen on loan until the end of the season.

On 18 August 2026, Schmidt joined Scottish Premiership side St Johnstone on a two-year deal.

== International career ==
Schmidt represented Germany at under-17 level.
