= Tim Oberdorf =

German footballer (born 1996)

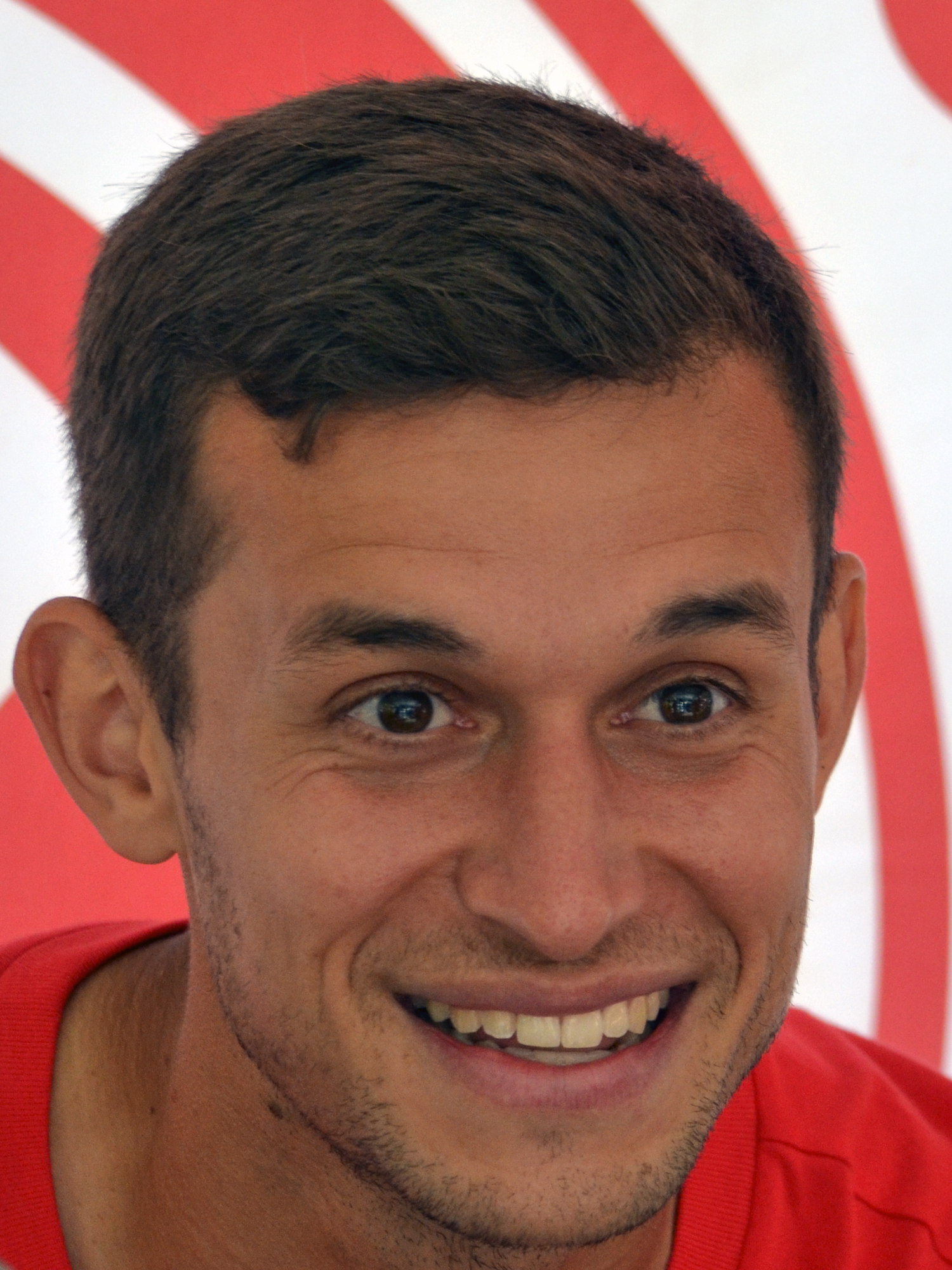

Personal information
- Full name: Tim Christopher Oberdorf
- Date of birth: 16 August 1996 (age 30)
- Place of birth: Hagen, Germany
- Height: 1.85 m (6 ft 1 in)
- Position: Centre-back

Team information
- Current team: Fortuna Düsseldorf
- Number: 15

Youth career
- –2008: TuS Ennepetal
- 2008–2015: TSG Sprockhövel

Senior career*
Years	Team	Apps	(Gls)
2015–2019	TSG Sprockhövel	127	(6)
2019–	Fortuna Düsseldorf II	75	(10)
2021–	Fortuna Düsseldorf	133	(5)
- * Club domestic league appearances and goals as of 18 May 2026

Tim Christopher Oberdorf (born 16 August 1996) is a German professional footballer who plays as a centre-back for 3. Liga club Fortuna Düsseldorf.

== Personal life ==
Oberdorf's sister Lena Oberdorf, also a footballer, plays for the Germany national team.

== Career statistics ==
As of match played on 5 August 2023

Appearances and goals by club, season and competition
Club	Season	League			DFB-Pokal		Other		Total	
Club	Season	Division	Apps	Goals	Apps	Goals	Apps	Goals	Apps	Goals
TSG Sprockhövel	2015–16	Oberliga Westfalen	30	0	0	0	—		30	0
TSG Sprockhövel	2016–17	Regionalliga West	33	0	0	0	—		33	0
TSG Sprockhövel	2017–18	Oberliga Westfalen	32	2	0	0	—		32	2
TSG Sprockhövel	2018–19	Oberliga Westfalen	32	4	0	0	—		32	4
TSG Sprockhövel	Total		127	6	0	0	0	0	127	6
Fortuna Düsseldorf II	2019–20	Regionalliga West	25	2	—		—		25	2
Fortuna Düsseldorf II	2020–21	Regionalliga West	37	2	—		—		37	2
Fortuna Düsseldorf II	2021–22	Regionalliga West	9	4	—		—		9	4
Fortuna Düsseldorf II	2022–23	Regionalliga West	1	0	—		—		1	0
Fortuna Düsseldorf II	Total		72	8	0	0	0	0	72	8
Fortuna Düsseldorf	2021–22	2. Bundesliga	18	0	2	0	—		20	0
Fortuna Düsseldorf	2022–23	2. Bundesliga	28	2	3	0	—		29	2
Fortuna Düsseldorf	2023-24	2. Bundesliga					—			
Fortuna Düsseldorf	Total		46	2	5	0	0	0	49	2
Career total			245	16	5	0	0	0	248	6
