= Jona Niemiec =

German footballer (born 2001)

Personal information
- Date of birth: 19 September 2001 (age 25)
- Place of birth: Lüdenscheid, Germany
- Height: 1.88 m (6 ft 2 in)
- Position: Forward

Team information
- Current team: OB
- Number: 11

Senior career*
Years	Team	Apps	(Gls)
2020–2021	TSG Sprockhövel	7	(3)
2021–2024	Fortuna Düsseldorf II	50	(16)
2023–2025	Fortuna Düsseldorf	71	(6)
2025–	OB	25	(5)
- * Club domestic league appearances and goals as of 19 May 2026

Jona Niemiec (born 19 September 2001) is a German footballer who plays as a forward for Danish Superliga club Odense Boldklub.

He began his senior career at TSG Sprockhövel, joining Fortuna Düsseldorf in 2021. He made his senior debut for the club in February 2023, and played in the 2. Bundesliga before his transfer to OB in September 2025.

== Early and personal life ==
Niemiec was born in Lüdenscheid, North Rhine-Westphalia. His father, brother and uncle were all involved in local football. He is of Polish origin.

Niemiec began playing football in his hometown as a youth for LTV 61 and SD Lüdenscheid, before joining Rot-Weiß Lüdenscheid. In the summer of 2020, he was about to join the latter club's senior team, but instead chose to sign for TSG Sprockhövel in the fifth-tier Oberliga Westfalen. His first year as a senior was abandoned due to the COVID-19 pandemic, but earned him trials at professional clubs Rot-Weiss Essen, SC Freiburg and FC Schalke 04 before he opted for Fortuna Düsseldorf. Aged 19, he left his job at plumbing manufacturer Flühs Drehtechnik.

== Career ==
=== Fortuna Düsseldorf ===
Having scored three goals in seven games for TSG Sprockhövel while missing only three minutes, Niemiec joined Düsseldorf in May 2021, being assigned to the reserve team in the fourth-tier Regionalliga.

On 8 February 2023, Niemiec made his professional debut in the DFB-Pokal round of 16 away to 1. FC Nürnberg. He came on as a substitute in added time for goalscorer Dawid Kownacki with Fortuna winning 1–0, but they conceded an equaliser and the game went to extra time. In time added onto extra time, he was fouled by opponent Florian Flick, who was sent off. The game went to a penalty shootout, in which he was the only player to miss, his attempt being saved by FCN goalkeeper Peter Vindahl Jensen.

Four days after his cup debut, Niemiec played his first 2. Bundesliga game, again as a substitute. He assisted the second goal of a 2–0 win at home to SV Sandhausen, scored by Rouwen Hennings. He played 12 games in his first league season, scoring once on 24 February to conclude a 3–1 win over Eintracht Braunschweig at the Merkur Spiel-Arena in his third match.

In the summer of 2023, Niemiec wanted to transfer to a club in the 3. Liga due to a lack of playing time, but his move did not come to fruition. On 5 December, in the last 16 of the cup, he came off the bench with five minutes remaining and scored both goals of a 2–1 win at 1. FC Magdeburg; his contributions earned the club €1.7 million in prize money. Fortuna came third in the 2023–24 2. Bundesliga and contested the promotion/relegation playoff against VfL Bochum, surrendering a 3–0 away win from the first leg as the game went to penalties; Niemiec came on as a substitute and scored his attempt while his team lost in sudden death.

=== Odense Boldklub ===
On transfer deadline day, 1 September 2025, Niemiec transferred to the Danish Superliga club Odense Boldklub on a deal until June 2028.
