= 2018–19 Fortuna Düsseldorf season =

Fortuna Düsseldorf
2018–19 season
- Chairman: Robert Schäfer
- Manager: Friedhelm Funkel
- Stadium: Merkur Spiel-Arena
- Bundesliga: 10th
- DFB-Pokal: Round of 16
- Top goalscorer: League: Dodi Lukebakio; Benito Raman (10 goals each); All: Dodi Lukebakio (14 goals)
- Highest home attendance: 53,400
- Lowest home attendance: 34,394
- Average home league attendance: 44,339
- Biggest win: Koblenz 0–5 Düsseldorf
- Biggest defeat: Frankfurt 7–1 Düsseldorf
Home colours	Away colours

The 2018–19 Fortuna Düsseldorf season season was the 124th edition of football Fortuna Düsseldorf's in existence and 24th overall season in the top flight of German football, the Bundesliga, having been promoted from the 2. Bundesliga in 2018. In addition to the domestic league, Fortuna Düsseldorf contested in the domestic cup, the DFB-Pokal. This is the 15th season for Düsseldorf in the Merkur Spiel-Arena, located in Düsseldorf, North Rhine-Westphalia, Germany. The season covered a period from 1 July 2018 to 30 June 2019.

== Players ==
Squad at end of season.

Note: Flags indicate national team as defined under FIFA eligibility rules; some limited exceptions apply. Players may hold more than one non-FIFA nationality.

No.	Pos.	Nation	Player
1	GK	GER	Michael Rensing
3	DF	GER	André Hoffmann
5	DF	TUR	Kaan Ayhan
6	MF	USA	Alfredo Morales
7	MF	GER	Oliver Fink (captain)
8	MF	GER	Aymen Barkok (on loan from Eintracht Frankfurt)
9	FW	BEL	Benito Raman
10	FW	GER	Marvin Ducksch
11	MF	TUR	Kenan Karaman
12	GK	GER	Jannick Theißen
13	DF	POL	Adam Bodzek
14	DF	AUT	Markus Suttner (on loan from Brighton and Hove Albion)
16	GK	CZE	Jaroslav Drobný
19	MF	CRO	Davor Lovren
20	MF	BEL	Dodi Lukebakio (on loan from Watford)
21	FW	SWE	Emir Kujović

No.	Pos.	Nation	Player
22	MF	AUT	Kevin Stöger
23	DF	GER	Niko Gießelmann
24	DF	GER	Georgios Siadas
25	DF	GER	Matthias Zimmermann
26	DF	GER	Diego Contento
27	FW	POL	Dawid Kownacki (on loan from Sampdoria)
28	FW	GER	Rouwen Hennings
30	GK	GER	Raphael Wolf
31	MF	GER	Marcel Sobottka (vice-captain)
32	DF	GER	Robin Bormuth
33	MF	JPN	Takashi Usami (on loan from Augsburg)
35	DF	POL	Marcin Kamiński (on loan from VfB Stuttgart)
38	GK	GER	Tim Wiesner
39	DF	GER	Jean Zimmer
40	MF	CAN	Kianz Froese

=== Left club during season ===
Note: Flags indicate national team as defined under FIFA eligibility rules; some limited exceptions apply. Players may hold more than one non-FIFA nationality.

No.	Pos.	Nation	Player
36	DF	GER	Anderson Lucoqui
16	FW	NOR	Håvard Nielsen (at MSV Duisburg until 30 June 2019)
18	DF	GER	Gökhan Gül (at Wehen Wiesbaden until 30 June 2019)
27	MF	GER	Taylan Duman

== Friendly matches ==
Win Draw Loss

== Competitions ==
Win Draw Loss

=== Overview ===
Competition	First match	Last match	Starting round	Final position	Record							
Competition	First match	Last match	Starting round	Final position	Pld	W	D	L	GF	GA	GD	Win %
Bundesliga	25 August 2018	18 May 2019	Matchday 1		34	13	5	16	49	65	−16	38.24
DFB-Pokal	19 August 2018	6 February 2019	First round	Round of 16	3	2	0	1	11	5	+6	66.67
Total					37	15	5	17	60	70	−10	40.54

Last updated: 25 May 2019
Source: Competitions

=== Bundesliga ===
==== League table ====
Pos	Team	Pld	W	D	L	GF	GA	GD	Pts
8	Werder Bremen	34	14	11	9	58	49	+9	53
9	1899 Hoffenheim	34	13	12	9	70	52	+18	51
10	Fortuna Düsseldorf	34	13	5	16	49	65	−16	44
11	Hertha BSC	34	11	10	13	49	57	−8	43
12	Mainz 05	34	12	7	15	46	57	−11	43

Source: DFB
Rules for classification: 1) Points; 2) Goal difference; 3) Goals scored; 4) Head-to-head results; 5) Head-to-head away goals scored; 6) Away goals scored; 7) Play-off

==== Results summary ====
Overall								Home						Away					
Pld	W	D	L	GF	GA	GD	Pts	W	D	L	GF	GA	GD	W	D	L	GF	GA	GD
34	13	5	16	49	65	−16	44	9	0	8	27	28	−1	4	5	8	22	37	−15

Last updated: 25 May 2019.
Source: Bundesliga

==== Results by round ====
Round	1	2	3	4	5	6	7	8	9	10	11	12	13	14	15	16	17	18	19	20	21	22	23	24	25	26	27	28	29	30	31	32	33	34
Ground	H	A	H	A	H	A	H	A	H	A	H	A	H	A	H	H	A	A	H	A	H	A	H	A	H	A	H	A	H	A	H	A	A	H
Result	L	D	W	D	L	L	L	L	L	L	W	D	L	L	W	W	W	W	L	D	W	L	W	W	L	L	W	W	L	L	W	D	L	W
Position	11	12	8	9	13	15	17	18	17	17	17	17	18	18	16	15	14	14	14	14	12	12	12	11	11	12	11	10	10	10	10	10	11	10

Updated to match(es) played on 25 May 2019. Source: DFB
A = Away; H = Home; W = Win; D = Draw; L = Loss

==== Matches ====
25 August 2018 1	Fortuna Düsseldorf	1–2	FC Augsburg	Düsseldorf
15:30 CEST (UTC+2)	Raman 39'	Report	Hinteregger 57'; Hahn 76'	Stadium: Merkur Spiel-Arena; Attendance: 40,996; Referee: Markus Schmidt

2 September 2018 2	RB Leipzig	1–1	Fortuna Düsseldorf	Leipzig
15:30 CEST (UTC+2)	Augustin 68'	Report	Zimmermann 47'	Stadium: Red Bull Arena; Attendance: 34,975; Referee: Marco Fritz

15 September 2018 3	Fortuna Düsseldorf	2–1	1899 Hoffenheim	Düsseldorf
15:30 CEST (UTC+2)	Morales 45'; Lukebakio 88' (pen.)	Report	Nelson 86'	Stadium: Merkur Spiel-Arena; Attendance: 40,111; Referee: Tobias Stieler

21 September 2018 4	VfB Stuttgart	0–0	Fortuna Düsseldorf	Stuttgart
20:30 CEST (UTC+2)		Report		Stadium: Mercedes-Benz Arena; Attendance: 54,410; Referee: Robert Hartmann

26 September 2018 5	Fortuna Düsseldorf	1–2	Bayer Leverkusen	Düsseldorf
18:30 CEST (UTC+2)	Hennings 90+4' (pen.)	Report	Volland 50', 60'	Stadium: Merkur Spiel-Arena; Attendance: 40,046; Referee: Manuel Gräfe

29 September 2018 6	1. FC Nürnberg	3–0	Fortuna Düsseldorf	Nuremberg
15:30 CEST (UTC+2)	Behrens 28' (pen.); Ishak 64'; Palacios Martínez 78'	Report		Stadium: Max-Morlock-Stadion; Attendance: 36,102; Referee: Harm Osmers

6 October 2018 7	Fortuna Düsseldorf	0–2	Schalke 04	Düsseldorf
15:30 CEST (UTC+2)		Report	McKennie 47'; Burgstaller 53'	Stadium: Merkur Spiel-Arena; Attendance: 52,000; Referee: Sven Jablonski

19 October 2018 8	Eintracht Frankfurt	7–1	Fortuna Düsseldorf	Frankfurt
20:30 CEST (UTC+2)	Haller 20' (pen.), 50'; Jović 26', 34', 55', 69', 72'	Report	Lukebakio 53'	Stadium: Commerzbank-Arena; Attendance: 51,000; Referee: Deniz Aytekin

27 October 2018 9	Fortuna Düsseldorf	0–3	VfL Wolfsburg	Düsseldorf
15:30 CEST (UTC+2)		Report	Weghorst 41' (pen.); Brekalo 73'; Ginczek 80'	Stadium: Merkur Spiel-Arena; Attendance: 38,043; Referee: Daniel Schlager

4 November 2018 10	Borussia Mönchengladbach	3–0	Fortuna Düsseldorf	Mönchengladbach
15:30 CET (UTC+1)	Hazard 48' (pen.), 82'; Hofmann 67'	Report		Stadium: Borussia-Park; Attendance: 54,022; Referee: Felix Brych

10 November 2018 11	Fortuna Düsseldorf	4–1	Hertha BSC	Düsseldorf
15:30 CET (UTC+1)	Usami 50'; Hennings 63'; Raman 84', 90+2'	Report	Selke 88'	Stadium: Merkur Spiel-Arena; Attendance: 38,743; Referee: Robert Hartmann

24 November 2018 12	Bayern Munich	3–3	Fortuna Düsseldorf	Munich
15:30 CET (UTC+1)	Süle 17'; Müller 20', 58'	Report	Lukebakio 44', 77', 90+3'	Stadium: Allianz Arena; Attendance: 75,000; Referee: Sven Jablonski

30 November 2018 13	Fortuna Düsseldorf	0–1	Mainz 05	Düsseldorf
20:30 CET (UTC+1)		Report	Mateta 67'	Stadium: Merkur Spiel-Arena; Attendance: 37,091; Referee: Manuel Gräfe

7 December 2018 14	Werder Bremen	3–1	Fortuna Düsseldorf	Bremen
20:30 CET (UTC+1)	Möhwald 20'; Harnik 71'; Sargent 78'	Report	Lukebakio 43' (pen.)	Stadium: Weser-Stadion; Attendance: 41,500; Referee: Marco Fritz

15 December 2018 15	Fortuna Düsseldorf	2–0	SC Freiburg	Düsseldorf
15:30 CET (UTC+1)	Ayhan 55', 79'	Report		Stadium: Merkur Spiel-Arena; Attendance: 39,301; Referee: Harm Osmers

18 December 2018 16	Fortuna Düsseldorf	2–1	Borussia Dortmund	Düsseldorf
20:30 CET (UTC+1)	Lukebakio 22'; Zimmer 56'	Report	Alcácer 81'	Stadium: Merkur Spiel-Arena; Attendance: 52,000; Referee: Tobias Welz

22 December 2018 17	Hannover 96	0–1	Fortuna Düsseldorf	Hanover
15:30 CET (UTC+1)		Report	Fink 90+2'	Stadium: HDI-Arena; Attendance: 34,200; Referee: Bastian Dankert

19 January 2019 18	FC Augsburg	1–2	Fortuna Düsseldorf	Augsburg
15:30 CET (UTC+1)	Schmid 64'	Report	Ducksch 45'; Raman 89'	Stadium: WWK Arena; Attendance: 27,568; Referee: Christian Dingert

27 January 2019 19	Fortuna Düsseldorf	0–4	RB Leipzig	Düsseldorf
18:00 CET (UTC+1)		Report	Poulsen 2', 16'; Konaté 9'; Laimer 68'	Stadium: Merkur Spiel-Arena; Attendance: 34,394; Referee: Robert Hartmann

2 February 2019 20	1899 Hoffenheim	1–1	Fortuna Düsseldorf	Sinsheim
15:30 CET (UTC+1)	Kramarić 16' (pen.)	Report	Hennings 46'	Stadium: PreZero Arena; Attendance: 24,747; Referee: Benjamin Cortus

10 February 2019 21	Fortuna Düsseldorf	3–0	VfB Stuttgart	Düsseldorf
18:00 CET (UTC+1)	Karaman 34'; Fink 49'; Raman 85'	Report		Stadium: Merkur Spiel-Arena; Attendance: 40,211; Referee: Christian Dingert

17 February 2019 22	Bayer Leverkusen	2–0	Fortuna Düsseldorf	Leverkusen
18:00 CET (UTC+1)	Havertz 18'; Bailey 66'	Report		Stadium: BayArena; Attendance: 27,717; Referee: Markus Schmidt

23 February 2019 23	Fortuna Düsseldorf	2–1	1. FC Nürnberg	Düsseldorf
18:30 CET (UTC+1)	Ewerton 62' (o.g.); Ayhan 83'	Report	Löwen 41'	Stadium: Merkur Spiel-Arena; Attendance: 48,816; Referee: Sascha Stegemann

2 March 2019 24	Schalke 04	0–4	Fortuna Düsseldorf	Gelsenkirchen
15:30 CET (UTC+1)		Report	Lukebakio 35' (pen.); Kownacki 62', 84'; Raman 68'	Stadium: Veltins-Arena; Attendance: 60,322; Referee: Felix Brych

11 March 2019 25	Fortuna Düsseldorf	0–3	Eintracht Frankfurt	Düsseldorf
20:30 CET (UTC+1)		Report	Paciência 48'; Haller 90+1', 90+3'	Stadium: Merkur Spiel-Arena; Attendance: 41,419; Referee: Robert Hartmann

16 March 2019 26	VfL Wolfsburg	5–2	Fortuna Düsseldorf	Wolfsburg
15:30 CET (UTC+1)	Mehmedi 34'; Weghorst 54', 59', 88'; Knoche 57'	Report	Ayhan 30'; Raman 65'	Stadium: Volkswagen Arena; Attendance: 25,350; Referee: Bastian Dankert

30 March 2019 27	Fortuna Düsseldorf	3–1	Borussia Mönchengladbach	Düsseldorf
15:30 CET (UTC+1)	Hennings 6', 16'; Stöger 12'	Report	Zakaria 83'	Stadium: Merkur Spiel-Arena; Attendance: 52,500; Referee: Tobias Stieler

6 April 2019 28	Hertha BSC	1–2	Fortuna Düsseldorf	Berlin
15:30 CEST (UTC+2)	Grujić 41'	Report	Raman 35', 61'	Stadium: Olympiastadion Berlin; Attendance: 51,604; Referee: Christian Dingert

14 April 2019 29	Fortuna Düsseldorf	1–4	Bayern Munich	Düsseldorf
15:30 CEST (UTC+2)	Lukebakio 89' (pen.)	Report	Coman 15', 41'; Gnabry 55'; Goretzka 90+2'	Stadium: Merkur Spiel-Arena; Attendance: 54,600; Referee: Felix Zwayer

20 April 2019 30	Mainz 05	3–1	Fortuna Düsseldorf	Mainz
15:30 CEST (UTC+2)	Mateta 1', 87'; Onisiwo 67'	Report	Lukebakio 19'	Stadium: Opel Arena; Attendance: 29,205; Referee: Markus Schmidt

27 April 2019 31	Fortuna Düsseldorf	4–1	Werder Bremen	Düsseldorf
15:30 CEST (UTC+2)	Raman 1'; Karaman 22'; Hennings 56'; Suttner 73'	Report	Kruse 28' (pen.)	Stadium: Merkur Spiel-Arena; Attendance: 52,500; Referee: Benjamin Cortus

5 May 2019 32	SC Freiburg	1–1	Fortuna Düsseldorf	Freiburg
15:30 CEST (UTC+2)	Grifo 9' (pen.)	Report	Kownacki 31'	Stadium: Schwarzwald-Stadion; Attendance: 24,000; Referee: Tobias Welz

11 May 2019 33	Borussia Dortmund	3–2	Fortuna Düsseldorf	Dortmund
15:30 CEST (UTC+2)	Pulisic 41'; Delaney 53'; Götze 90+2'	Report	Fink 47'; Kownacki 90+5'	Stadium: Signal Iduna Park; Attendance: 81,365; Referee: Tobias Stieler

18 May 2019 34	Fortuna Düsseldorf	2–1	Hannover 96	Düsseldorf
15:30 CEST (UTC+2)	Hennings 56'; Karaman 60'	Report	Müller 78'	Stadium: Merkur Spiel-Arena; Attendance: 50,000; Referee: Benjamin Cortus

=== DFB-Pokal ===
19 August 2018 First round	Rot-Weiss Koblenz	0–5	Fortuna Düsseldorf	Koblenz
15:30 CEST (UTC+2)		Report	Lukebakio 9', 12'; Ducksch 32'; Stöger 44'; Raman 62'	Stadium: Stadion Oberwerth; Attendance: 7,500; Referee: Benjamin Cortus

30 October 2018 Second round	SSV Ulm	1–5	Fortuna Düsseldorf	Ulm
18:30 CET (UTC+1)	Morina 1'	Report	Ducksch 15', 70'; Hennings 33'; Lukebakio 37', 43'	Stadium: Donaustadion; Attendance: 17,000; Referee: Florian Badstübner

6 February 2019 Round of 16	Schalke 04	4–1	Fortuna Düsseldorf	Gelsenkirchen
20:45 CET (UTC+1)	Kutucu 30'; Sané 48', 87'; Uth 53'	Report	Hennings 71'	Stadium: Veltins-Arena; Attendance: 56,638; Referee: Manuel Gräfe

== Statistics ==
=== Appearances and goals ===
No.	Pos	Nat	Player	Total		Bundesliga		DFB-Pokal	
No.	Pos	Nat	Player	Apps	Goals	Apps	Goals	Apps	Goals
Goalkeepers
1	GK	(Germany) GER	Michael Rensing	29	0	28	0	1	0
16	GK	(Czech Republic) CZE	Jaroslav Drobný	3	0	2	0	1	0
30	GK	(Germany) GER	Raphael Wolf	1	0	0	0	1	0
38	GK	(Germany) GER	Tim Wiesner	0	0	0	0	0	0
Defenders
3	DF	(Germany) GER	André Hoffmann	11	0	7+2	0	2	0
5	DF	(Turkey) TUR	Kaan Ayhan	27	4	24	4	3	0
13	DF	(Poland) POL	Adam Bodzek	18	0	17+1	0	0	0
14	DF	(Austria) AUT	Markus Suttner	4	0	3	0	1	0
23	DF	(Germany) GER	Niko Gießelmann	29	0	27	0	2	0
24	DF	(Germany) GER	Georgios Siadas	0	0	0	0	0	0
25	DF	(Germany) GER	Matthias Zimmermann	32	1	30	1	2	0
26	DF	(Germany) GER	Diego Contento	1	0	0	0	0+1	0
32	DF	(Germany) GER	Robin Bormuth	11	0	6+4	0	1	0
35	DF	(Poland) POL	Marcin Kamiński	26	0	26	0	0	0
39	DF	(Germany) GER	Jean Zimmer	20	1	17+1	1	2	0
Midfielders
6	MF	(United States) USA	Alfredo Morales	23	1	16+4	1	2+1	0
7	MF	(Germany) GER	Oliver Fink	16	2	12+3	2	0+1	0
8	MF	(Germany) GER	Aymen Barkok	11	0	4+6	0	1	0
11	MF	(Turkey) TUR	Kenan Karaman	18	1	6+11	1	0+1	0
19	MF	(Croatia) CRO	Davor Lovren	2	0	0+2	0	0	0
20	MF	(Belgium) BEL	Dodi Lukebakio	30	14	19+8	10	2+1	4
22	MF	(Austria) AUT	Kevin Stöger	24	2	20+1	1	2+1	1
31	MF	(Germany) GER	Marcel Sobottka	15	0	11+3	0	1	0
33	MF	(Japan) JPN	Takashi Usami	21	1	10+9	1	2	0
40	MF	(Canada) CAN	Kianz Froese	0	0	0	0	0	0
Forwards
9	FW	(Belgium) BEL	Benito Raman	28	10	16+10	9	1+1	1
10	FW	(Germany) GER	Marvin Ducksch	19	4	8+8	1	3	3
21	FW	(Sweden) SWE	Emir Kujović	0	0	0	0	0	0
27	FW	(Poland) POL	Dawid Kownacki	8	2	5+2	2	0+1	0
28	FW	(Germany) GER	Rouwen Hennings	29	7	16+10	5	3	2
Players transferred out during the season
16	FW	(Norway) NOR	Håvard Nielsen	2	1	1	1	0+1	0

Last updated: 20 April 2019
Source: Competitions
