= 2019–20 Fortuna Düsseldorf season =

Fortuna Düsseldorf
2019–20 season
- Board Members: Thomas Röttgermann (President); Erich Rutemöller; Lutz Pfannenstiel
- Head coach: Friedhelm Funkel (until 29 January); Uwe Rösler (from 29 January)
- Stadium: Merkur Spiel-Arena
- Bundesliga: 17th (relegated)
- DFB-Pokal: Quarter-finals
- Top goalscorer: League: Rouwen Hennings (15); All: Rouwen Hennings (19)
Home colours	Away colours	Third colours

The 2019–20 Fortuna Düsseldorf season was Fortuna Düsseldorf's 121st edition in existence and the club's 39th successive season in the top flight of Germany football. This was their second consecutive season in the Bundesliga. In addition to the domestic league, Fortuna Düsseldorf contested in 2019–20 DFB-Pokal. The season covered the period from 1 July 2019 to 30 June 2020.

== Players ==
=== Current squad ===
As of 1 February 2020

Note: Flags indicate national team as defined under FIFA eligibility rules; some limited exceptions apply. Players may hold more than one non-FIFA nationality.

No.	Pos.	Nation	Player
1	GK	GER	Michael Rensing
3	DF	GER	André Hoffmann
4	DF	GHA	Kasim Nuhu (on loan from 1899 Hoffenheim)
5	DF	TUR	Kaan Ayhan
6	MF	USA	Alfredo Morales
7	MF	GER	Oliver Fink (captain)
8	MF	GER	Aymen Barkok (on loan from Eintracht Frankfurt)
9	FW	POL	Dawid Kownacki
10	MF	KOS	Valon Berisha (on loan from Lazio)
11	MF	TUR	Kenan Karaman
13	DF	POL	Adam Bodzek (3rd captain)
14	MF	GHA	Kelvin Ofori
15	MF	GER	Erik Thommy (on loan from VfB Stuttgart)
18	MF	GER	Thomas Pledl
19	DF	DEN	Mathias Jørgensen (on loan from Fenerbahçe)
20	FW	GER	Steven Skrzybski (on loan from Schalke 04)

No.	Pos.	Nation	Player
22	MF	AUT	Kevin Stöger
23	DF	GER	Niko Gießelmann
24	GK	USA	Zack Steffen (on loan from Manchester City)
25	DF	GER	Matthias Zimmermann
26	DF	GER	Diego Contento
27	FW	GHA	Opoku Ampomah
28	FW	GER	Rouwen Hennings (vice-captain)
29	DF	AUT	Markus Suttner
30	GK	GER	Raphael Wolf
31	MF	GER	Marcel Sobottka
32	DF	GER	Robin Bormuth
33	GK	GER	Florian Kastenmeier
37	FW	GHA	Bernard Tekpetey (on loan from Schalke 04)
38	GK	GER	Tim Wiesner
39	DF	GER	Jean Zimmer
40	DF	GER	Johannes Bühler

=== Out of squad ===
Note: Flags indicate national team as defined under FIFA eligibility rules; some limited exceptions apply. Players may hold more than one non-FIFA nationality.

No.	Pos.	Nation	Player
12	GK	GER	Jannick Theißen
—	DF	GER	Georgios Siadas

=== Out on loan ===
Note: Flags indicate national team as defined under FIFA eligibility rules; some limited exceptions apply. Players may hold more than one non-FIFA nationality.

No.	Pos.	Nation	Player
—	MF	CRO	Davor Lovren (at Slaven Belupo until 30 June 2020)
—	DF	GER	Gökhan Gül (at Wehen Wiesbaden until 30 June 2020)

No.	Pos.	Nation	Player
—	FW	GER	Emmanuel Iyoha (at Holstein Kiel until 30 June 2020)

== Pre-season and friendlies ==
Win Draw Loss

4 July 2019 Friendly	RSV Weyer (Germany)	0–14	(Germany) Fortuna Düsseldorf	Weyer, Germany
15:00 CEST (UTC+2)				Stadium: Rasenplatz Villmar-Weyer

8 July 2019 Friendly	Sportfreunde Siegen (Germany)	0–6	(Germany) Fortuna Düsseldorf	Siegen, Germany
17:00 CEST (UTC+2)				Stadium: Leimbachstadion

20 July 2019 Friendly	Fortuna Düsseldorf (Germany)	1–1	(Turkey) İstanbul Başakşehir	Leogang, Austria
15:00 CEST (UTC+2)	Karaman 73'		Gulbrandsen 25'	Stadium: Steinbergstadion

24 July 2019 Friendly	Fortuna Düsseldorf (Germany)	1–0	(Spain) Rayo Vallecano	St. Johann, Austria
18:00 CEST (UTC+2)				Stadium: Koasastadion St. Johann

31 July 2019 Friendly	Anderlecht (Belgium)	1–2	(Germany) Fortuna Düsseldorf	Maasmechelen, Belgium
18:00 CEST (UTC+2)				Stadium: Patrostadion

3 August 2019 Friendly	Fortuna Düsseldorf (Germany)	3–2	(Spain) Eibar	Düsseldorf, Germany
15:00 CEST (UTC+2)	Ampomah 4', 81'; Hennings 53'		Inui 20'; Benito 77'	Stadium: Paul-Janes-Stadion; Attendance: 3,500; Referee: Christian Bandurski (Germany)

4 August 2019 Friendly	Fortuna Düsseldorf (Germany)	1–2	(Spain) Eibar	Düsseldorf, Germany
09:30 CEST (UTC+2)	Pledl 82'		Carles 10' Benito 35'	Stadium: Kleiner Kampfbahn Arena; Referee: Christian Bandurski (Germany)

6 August 2019 Friendly	VfL Benrath (Germany)	1–15	(Germany) Fortuna Düsseldorf	Düsseldorf, Germany
16:00 CEST (UTC+2)				Stadium: Stadion BZA Karl-Hohmann-Straße

20 August 2019 Friendly	TuRU Düsseldorf (Germany)	2–4	(Germany) Fortuna Düsseldorf	Düsseldorf, Germany
18:00 CEST (UTC+2)				Stadium: Stadion an der Feuerbachstraße

7 January 2020 Friendly	Twente (Netherlands)	1–1	(Germany) Fortuna Düsseldorf	Coín, Spain
16:00 CET (UTC+1)	Hölscher 87'	Report	Skrzybski 43'	Stadium: Estadio Jose Burgos Quintana

10 January 2020 Friendly	Basel (Switzerland)	3–2	(Germany) Fortuna Düsseldorf	Marbella, Spain
16:00 CET (UTC+1)	Campo 25'; Bodzek 36' (o.g.); Stocker 63'	Report	Tekpetey 9'; Thommy 43'	Stadium: Marbella Football Center

== Competitions ==
Win Draw Loss

=== Overview ===
Competition	First match	Last match	Starting round	Final position	Record							
Competition	First match	Last match	Starting round	Final position	Pld	W	D	L	GF	GA	GD	Win %
Bundesliga	17 August 2019	27 June 2020	Matchday 1	17th	34	6	12	16	36	67	−31	17.65
DFB-Pokal	10 August 2019	3 March 2020	First round	Quarter-finals	4	3	1	0	11	5	+6	75.00
Total					38	9	13	16	47	72	−25	23.68

Last updated: 27 June 2020
Source: Soccerway

=== Bundesliga ===
==== League table ====
Pos	Team	Pld	W	D	L	GF	GA	GD	Pts	Qualification or relegation
14	1. FC Köln	34	10	6	18	51	69	−18	36	
15	FC Augsburg	34	9	9	16	45	63	−18	36	
16	Werder Bremen (O)	34	8	7	19	42	69	−27	31	Qualification for the relegation play-offs
17	Fortuna Düsseldorf (R)	34	6	12	16	36	67	−31	30	Relegation to 2. Bundesliga
18	SC Paderborn (R)	34	4	8	22	37	74	−37	20	Relegation to 2. Bundesliga

Source: DFB
Rules for classification: 1) Points; 2) Goal difference; 3) Goals scored; 4) Head-to-head results; 5) Head-to-head away goals scored; 6) Away goals scored; 7) Play-off.
(O) Play-off winners; (R) Relegated

==== Results summary ====
Overall								Home						Away					
Pld	W	D	L	GF	GA	GD	Pts	W	D	L	GF	GA	GD	W	D	L	GF	GA	GD
34	6	12	16	36	67	−31	30	4	6	7	18	28	−10	2	6	9	18	39	−21

Last updated: 27 June 2020.
Source: Bundesliga

==== Results by round ====
Round	1	2	3	4	5	6	7	8	9	10	11	12	13	14	15	16	17	18	19	20	21	22	23	24	25	26	27	28	29	30	31	32	33	34
Ground	A	H	A	H	A	H	A	H	A	H	A	H	A	H	A	A	H	H	A	H	A	H	A	H	A	H	A	H	A	H	A	H	H	A
Result	W	L	L	D	L	L	L	W	L	W	D	L	D	L	L	L	W	L	L	D	D	L	W	D	D	D	D	W	L	D	L	D	D	L
Position	4	8	12	11	13	14	15	13	14	13	14	14	15	16	16	17	16	17	18	17	16	16	16	16	16	16	16	16	16	16	16	16	16	17

Updated to match(es) played on 27 June 2020. Source: Bundesliga
A = Away; H = Home; W = Win; D = Draw; L = Loss

==== Matches ====
The Bundesliga schedule was announced on 28 June 2019.

17 August 2019 1	Werder Bremen	1–3	Fortuna Düsseldorf	Bremen
15:30 CEST (UTC+2)	Eggestein 47'	Report	Karaman (yellow card) 17', (goal) 52'; Thommy (yellow card) 28'; Hennings 36'; Ayhan 64'	Stadium: Weser-Stadion; Attendance: 42,100; Referee: Felix Zwayer

24 August 2019 2	Fortuna Düsseldorf	1–3	Bayer Leverkusen	Düsseldorf
15:30 CEST (UTC+2)	Baker (yellow card) 49'; Morales (yellow card) 61', (goal) 82'; Zimmermann (yellow card) 77'	Report	Baker 6' (o.g.); Aránguiz (yellow card) 14', (goal) 33'; Bellarabi 39'; Tah (yellow card) 80'	Stadium: Merkur Spiel-Arena; Attendance: 44,538; Referee: Patrick Ittrich

1 September 2019 3	Eintracht Frankfurt	2–1	Fortuna Düsseldorf	Frankfurt
18:00 CEST (UTC+2)	Kamada (yellow card) 26'; Kohr (yellow card) 51'; Dost 57'; Paciência 86'	Report	Ayhan (yellow card) 25'; Hennings 36'; Gießelmann (yellow card) 45'; Hoffmann (yellow card) 49'; Bodzek (yellow card) 64'	Stadium: Commerzbank-Arena; Attendance: 49,800; Referee: Frank Willenborg

13 September 2019 4	Fortuna Düsseldorf	1–1	VfL Wolfsburg	Düsseldorf
20:30 CEST (UTC+2)	Gießelmann 16'	Report	Weghorst 29', (yellow card) 33'; Knoche (yellow card) 40'	Stadium: Merkur Spiel-Arena; Attendance: 36,758; Referee: Manuel Gräfe

22 September 2019 5	Borussia Mönchengladbach	2–1	Fortuna Düsseldorf	Mönchengladbach
15:30 CEST (UTC+2)	Lainer (yellow card) 2'; Thuram 74', 87'; Zakaria (yellow card) 77'	Report	Nuhu 6'; Bodzek (yellow card) 35'; Zimmermann (yellow card) 49'; Ayhan (yellow card) 65'	Stadium: Borussia-Park; Attendance: 52,413; Referee: Christian Dingert

29 September 2019 6	Fortuna Düsseldorf	1–2	SC Freiburg	Düsseldorf
15:30 CEST (UTC+2)	Gießelmann (yellow card) 30'; Hennings 42'; Kownacki (yellow card) 60'	Report	Höfler (yellow card) 32'; Schmid 45'; Petersen (yellow card) 59'; Waldschmidt 81'	Stadium: Merkur Spiel-Arena; Attendance: 39,244; Referee: Daniel Siebert

4 October 2019 7	Hertha BSC	3–1	Fortuna Düsseldorf	Berlin
20:30 CEST (UTC+2)	Boyata (yellow card) 31'; Ibišević 37'; Dilrosun 44'; Skjelbred (yellow card) 52'; Grujić (yellow card) 55'; Darida 62'	Report	Hennings 32' (pen.); Bodzek (yellow card) 45'; Morales (yellow card) 75'; Tekpetey (yellow card) 88'	Stadium: Olympiastadion; Attendance: 37,128; Referee: Martin Petersen

19 October 2019 8	Fortuna Düsseldorf	1–0	Mainz 05	Düsseldorf
15:30 CEST (UTC+2)	Ayhan (yellow card) 60'; Tekpetey (yellow card) 66'; Hennings 82'	Report	Fernandes (yellow card) 31' (yellow-red card) 45+1'; Zentner (yellow card) 82'; Boëtius (yellow card) 87'	Stadium: Merkur Spiel-Arena; Attendance: 40,660; Referee: Felix Zwayer

26 October 2019 9	SC Paderborn	2–0	Fortuna Düsseldorf	Paderborn
15:30 CEST (UTC+2)	Sabiri (yellow card) 23', (goal) 43'; Gjasula (yellow card) 30'; Zolinski (yellow card) 57'; Schonlau 64'; Dräger (yellow card) 78'; Kilian (yellow card) 90+3'	Report	Zimmermann (yellow card) 22'; Kownacki (yellow card) 48'; Zimmer (yellow card) 52'; Morales (yellow card) 83'	Stadium: Benteler-Arena; Attendance: 14,182; Referee: Bastian Dankert

3 November 2019 10	Fortuna Düsseldorf	2–0	1. FC Köln	Düsseldorf
15:30 CET (UTC+1)	Hennings 38' (pen.); Thommy 61'; Bodzek (yellow card) 86'	Report	Ehizibue (yellow card) 26'; Terodde (yellow card) 27'; Drexler (yellow card) 51'	Stadium: Merkur Spiel-Arena; Attendance: 51,155; Referee: Sven Jablonski

9 November 2019 11	Schalke 04	3–3	Fortuna Düsseldorf	Gelsenkirchen
15:30 CET (UTC+1)	Caligiuri 33'; McKennie (yellow card) 62'; Kabak 67'; Serdar 79', (yellow card) 80'	Report	Morales (yellow card) 53'; Hennings 62' (pen.), 74', 85'; Fink (yellow card) 76'; Hoffmann (yellow card) 89'; Ayhan (yellow card) 90+1'	Stadium: Veltins-Arena; Attendance: 61,831; Referee: Robert Hartmann

23 November 2019 12	Fortuna Düsseldorf	0–4	Bayern Munich	Düsseldorf
15:30 CET (UTC+1)	Hennings (yellow card) 36'	Report	Pavard 11'; Martínez (yellow card) 22'; Tolisso 27'; Gnabry 34'; Coutinho 70'	Stadium: Merkur Spiel-Arena; Attendance: 53,000; Referee: Frank Willenborg

30 November 2019 13	1899 Hoffenheim	1–1	Fortuna Düsseldorf	Sinsheim
15:30 CET (UTC+1)	Kramarić 6'; Posch (yellow card) 54'; Rudy (yellow card) 67'	Report	Hennings (yellow card) 24', (goal) 87'; Tekpetey (yellow card) 26'; Ayhan (yellow card) 55'; Suttner (yellow card) 84'	Stadium: PreZero Arena; Attendance: 25,427; Referee: Martin Petersen

7 December 2019 14	Borussia Dortmund	5–0	Fortuna Düsseldorf	Dortmund
15:30 CET (UTC+1)	Reus 42', 69'; Hazard 58'; Sancho 63', 74'	Report	Zimmer (yellow card) 2'; Zimmermann (yellow card) 28'; Morales (yellow card) 55'	Stadium: Signal Iduna Park; Attendance: 81,365; Referee: Daniel Siebert

14 December 2019 15	Fortuna Düsseldorf	0–3	RB Leipzig	Düsseldorf
18:30 CET (UTC+1)	Ayhan (yellow card) 57'; Bodzek (yellow card) 78'	Report	Schick 2'; Demme (yellow card) 33'; Werner 58' (pen.); Mukiele 75'	Stadium: Merkur Spiel-Arena; Attendance: 40,000; Referee: Robert Hartmann

17 December 2019 16	FC Augsburg	3–0	Fortuna Düsseldorf	Augsburg
20:30 CET (UTC+1)	Max 32', 72'; Khedira (yellow card) 46'; Jedvaj 61'; Lichtsteiner (yellow card) 87'; Vargas (yellow card) 90'	Report	Gießelmann (yellow card) 34'; Morales (yellow card) 40'; Ampomah (yellow card) 52'; Tekpetey (yellow card) 86'	Stadium: WWK Arena; Attendance: 27,763; Referee: Marco Fritz

22 December 2019 17	Fortuna Düsseldorf	2–1	Union Berlin	Düsseldorf
15:30 CET (UTC+1)	Hennings 38'; Bodzek (yellow card) 68'; Thommy 90', (yellow card) 90+1'	Report	Lenz (yellow card) 46'; Parensen 48'; Trimmel (yellow card) 81'; Friedrich (yellow card) 84'; Gentner (yellow card) 90+4'	Stadium: Merkur Spiel-Arena; Attendance: 45,490; Referee: Benjamin Cortus

18 January 2020 18	Fortuna Düsseldorf	0–1	Werder Bremen	Düsseldorf
15:30 CET (UTC+1)	Fink (yellow card) 66'; Stöger (yellow card) 72'; Hoffmann (yellow card) 90+3'; Bodzek (yellow card) 90+5'	Report	Şahin (yellow card) 29'; Eggestein (yellow card) 60'; Kastenmeier 67' (o.g.); Friedl (yellow card) 72'; Moisander (yellow card) 72' (yellow-red card) 90+5'	Stadium: Merkur Spiel-Arena; Attendance: 46,000; Referee: Felix Brych

26 January 2020 19	Bayer Leverkusen	3–0	Fortuna Düsseldorf	Leverkusen
18:00 CET (UTC+1)	Havertz 40'; L. Bender 79'; Alario 89' (pen.)	Report	Hoffmann (yellow card) 19'; Kownacki (yellow card) 86'; Hennings (yellow card) 87'	Stadium: BayArena; Attendance: 26,250; Referee: Daniel Schlager

1 February 2020 20	Fortuna Düsseldorf	1–1	Eintracht Frankfurt	Düsseldorf
15:30 CET (UTC+1)	Stöger (yellow card) 50'; Ayhan (yellow card) 72', (goal) 78'	Report	Ilsanker (yellow card) 64'; Chandler 90+3'	Stadium: Merkur Spiel-Arena; Attendance: 45,018; Referee: Frank Willenborg

8 February 2020 21	VfL Wolfsburg	1–1	Fortuna Düsseldorf	Wolfsburg
15:30 CET (UTC+1)	Pongračić (red card) 48'; Steffen 50'	Report	Zimmermann 13'; Hoffmann (yellow card) 79'	Stadium: Volkswagen Arena; Attendance: 23,445; Referee: Tobias Stieler

15 February 2020 22	Fortuna Düsseldorf	1–4	Borussia Mönchengladbach	Düsseldorf
18:30 CET (UTC+1)	Thommy 29'; Ayhan (yellow card) 68'; Jørgensen (yellow card) 90+1'	Report	Hofmann 22'; Stindl 51', 78', (yellow card) 71'; Thuram (yellow card) 75'; Neuhaus 82'	Stadium: Merkur Spiel-Arena; Attendance: 51,000; Referee: Daniel Siebert

22 February 2020 23	SC Freiburg	0–2	Fortuna Düsseldorf	Freiburg
15:30 CET (UTC+1)	Höler (yellow card) 90+4'	Report	Ayhan (yellow card) 34'; Hoffmann 37'; Berisha (yellow card) 44'; Gießelmann (yellow card) 52'; Thommy 61'; Karaman (yellow card) 90'	Stadium: Schwarzwald-Stadion; Attendance: 24,000; Referee: Frank Willenborg

28 February 2020 24	Fortuna Düsseldorf	3–3	Hertha BSC	Düsseldorf
20:30 CET (UTC+1)	Karaman 6', 45+1'; Thommy 9', (yellow card) 40'; Bodzek (yellow card) 52'	Report	Klünter (yellow card) 35'; Cunha (yellow card) 60', (goal) 66'; Thommy 64' (o.g.); Piątek 75' (pen.)	Stadium: Merkur Spiel-Arena; Attendance: 31,632; Referee: Tobias Stieler

8 March 2020 25	Mainz 05	1–1	Fortuna Düsseldorf	Mainz
18:00 CET (UTC+1)	Mateta (yellow card) 41' (yellow-red card) 77'; Öztunalı 62'; Mwene (yellow card) 66'	Report	Stöger (yellow card) 38'; Karaman 85'	Stadium: Opel Arena; Attendance: 21,409; Referee: Harm Osmers

16 May 2020 26	Fortuna Düsseldorf	0–0	SC Paderborn	Düsseldorf
15:30 CEST (UTC+2)	Ayhan (yellow card) 24'; Karaman (yellow card) 48'	Report	Gjasula (yellow card) 31'; Hünemeier (yellow card) 90'	Stadium: Merkur Spiel-Arena; Attendance: 0 Referee: Frank Willenborg
Note: The match was postponed on 13 March due to the pandemic of COVID-19 in Germany, and rescheduled to 16 May.

24 May 2020 27	1. FC Köln	2–2	Fortuna Düsseldorf	Cologne
18:00 CEST (UTC+2)	Modeste 88'; Córdoba 90+1'	Report	Karaman 41'; Thommy 61'; Sobottka (yellow card) 90+4'	Stadium: RheinEnergieStadion; Attendance: 0 Referee: Benjamin Cortus
Note: The match was postponed on 13 March due to the pandemic of COVID-19 in Germany, and rescheduled to 24 May.

27 May 2020 28	Fortuna Düsseldorf	2–1	Schalke 04	Düsseldorf
20:30 CEST (UTC+2)	Sobottka (yellow card) 52'; Hennings 63'; Karaman 68'; Hoffmann (yellow card) 80'; Bodzek (yellow card) 90+3'	Report	Burgstaller (yellow card) 18'; Kabak (yellow card) 45'; McKennie 53'	Stadium: Merkur Spiel-Arena; Attendance: 0 Referee: Tobias Welz
Note: The match was postponed on 24 March due to the pandemic of COVID-19 in Germany, and rescheduled to 27 May.

30 May 2020 29	Bayern Munich	5–0	Fortuna Düsseldorf	Munich
18:30 CEST (UTC+2)	Jørgensen 15' (o.g.); Pavard 29'; Lewandowski 43', 50'; Davies 52'	Report	Karaman (yellow card) 26'; Gießelmann (yellow card) 88'; Suttner (yellow card) 90'	Stadium: Allianz Arena; Attendance: 0 Referee: Robert Hartmann
Note: The match was postponed on 24 March due to the pandemic of COVID-19 in Germany, and rescheduled to 30 May.

6 June 2020 30	Fortuna Düsseldorf	2–2	1899 Hoffenheim	Düsseldorf
15:30 CEST (UTC+2)	Hennings 5', 76' (pen.), (yellow card) 90+4'; Bodzek (yellow card) 26'; Hoffmann (yellow card) 45+1'; Suttner (yellow card) 64'	Report	Hübner (red card) 9'; Dabbur 16'; Skov (yellow card) 53'; Zuber 61'; Nordtveit (yellow card) 75'; Kramarić (yellow card) 87'; Grillitsch (yellow card) 88'	Stadium: Merkur Spiel-Arena; Attendance: 0 Referee: Sören Storks
Note: The match was postponed on 24 March due to the pandemic of COVID-19 in Germany, and rescheduled to 6 June.

13 June 2020 31	Fortuna Düsseldorf	0–1	Borussia Dortmund	Düsseldorf
15:30 CEST (UTC+2)	Gießelmann (yellow card) 80'	Report	Hazard (yellow card) 58'; Akanji (yellow card) 70'; Hakimi (yellow card) 85'; Haaland 90+5'	Stadium: Merkur Spiel-Arena; Attendance: 0 Referee: Sascha Stegemann
Note: The match was postponed on 24 March due to the pandemic of COVID-19 in Germany, and rescheduled to 13 June.

17 June 2020 32	RB Leipzig	2–2	Fortuna Düsseldorf	Leipzig
20:30 CEST (UTC+2)	Kampl 60'; Werner 63'; Angeliño (yellow card) 90+4'	Report	Skrzybski 87'; Hoffmann 90+2'	Stadium: Red Bull Arena; Attendance: 0 Referee: Manuel Gräfe
Note: The match was postponed on 24 March due to the pandemic of COVID-19 in Germany, and rescheduled to 17 June.

20 June 2020 33	Fortuna Düsseldorf	1–1	FC Augsburg	Düsseldorf
15:30 CEST (UTC+2)	Hennings 25'; Gießelmann (yellow card) 79'	Report	Niederlechner 10'	Stadium: Merkur Spiel-Arena; Attendance: 0 Referee: Daniel Siebert
Note: The match was postponed on 24 March due to the pandemic of COVID-19 in Germany, and rescheduled to 20 June.

27 June 2020 34	Union Berlin	3–0	Fortuna Düsseldorf	Berlin
15:30 CEST (UTC+2)	Ujah 26'; Gentner 54'; Abdullahi 90'	Report	Kownacki (yellow card) 73'	Stadium: Stadion An der Alten Försterei; Attendance: 0 Referee: Harm Osmers
Note: The match was postponed on 7 May due to the pandemic of COVID-19 in Germany, and rescheduled to 27 June.

=== DFB-Pokal ===
10 August 2019 First round	FC 08 Villingen	1–3 (a.e.t.)	Fortuna Düsseldorf	Villingen-Schwenningen
15:30 CEST (UTC+2)	Ukoh 42' (pen.); Yahyaijan (yellow card) 45'; Wehrle (yellow card) 98'; Weißhaar (red card) 104'; Feger (yellow card) 109'; Serpa (yellow card) 113'	Report	Tekpetey (yellow card) 45'; Ampomah 56'; Barkok (yellow card) 80'; Gießelmann (yellow card) 94'; Ofori 102'; Hoffmann (yellow card) 110'; Hennings 116'	Stadium: MS Technologie Arena; Attendance: 8,000; Referee: Florian Heft

30 October 2019 Second round	Fortuna Düsseldorf	2–1	Erzgebirge Aue	Düsseldorf
20:45 CET (UTC+1)	Gießelmann (yellow card) 34'; Hennings 45' (pen.); Sobottka (yellow card) 50'; Nuhu 75'	Report	Krüger 12'; Samson (yellow card) 81'	Stadium: Merkur Spiel-Arena; Attendance: 20,141; Referee: Tobias Reichel

4 February 2020 Round of 16	1. FC Kaiserslautern	2–5	Fortuna Düsseldorf	Kaiserslautern
18:30 CET (UTC+1)	Kühlwetter 10', 39' (pen.), (yellow card) 86'	Report	Ampomah 9', (yellow card) 21'; Gießelmann (yellow card) 38'; Morales (yellow card) 48'; Hennings 49', 78'; Kastenmeier (yellow card) 52'; Zimmermann 65'; Ofori (yellow card) 77'; Stöger 83'	Stadium: Fritz-Walter-Stadion; Attendance: 35,340; Referee: Markus Schmidt

3 March 2020 Quarter-finals	1. FC Saarbrücken	1–1 (a.e.t.) (7–6 p)	Fortuna Düsseldorf	Völklingen
18:30 CET (UTC+1)	Jänicke 31', (yellow card) 75'; Golley (yellow card) 114'	Report	Ofori (yellow card) 45+2'; Thommy (yellow card) 72'; Jørgensen 90', (yellow card) 105'; Morales (yellow card) 116'; Stöger (yellow card) 118'	Stadium: Hermann-Neuberger-Stadion; Attendance: 6,800; Referee: Deniz Aytekin
	Penalties
	Zellner (penalty missed); Jacob (penalty scored); Zeitz (penalty scored); Golley (penalty missed); Schorch (penalty scored); Andrist (penalty missed); Froese (penalty scored); Barylla (penalty scored); Jänicke (penalty scored); Müller (penalty scored)		(penalty scored) Ayhan; (penalty scored) Hennings; (penalty missed) Karaman; (penalty scored) Skrzybski; (penalty missed) Stöger; (penalty missed) Zimmermann; (penalty scored) Suttner; (penalty scored) Ampomah; (penalty scored) Morales; (penalty missed) Jørgensen

== Statistics ==
=== Appearances and goals ===
No.	Pos	Nat	Player	Total		Bundesliga		DFB-Pokal	
No.	Pos	Nat	Player	Apps	Goals	Apps	Goals	Apps	Goals
Goalkeepers
1	GK	(Germany) GER	Michael Rensing	0	0	0	0	0	0
24	GK	(United States) USA	Zack Steffen	18	0	17	0	1	0
30	GK	(Germany) GER	Raphael Wolf	0	0	0	0	0	0
33	GK	(Germany) GER	Florian Kastenmeier	20	0	17	0	3	0
38	GK	(Germany) GER	Tim Wiesner	0	0	0	0	0	0
Defenders
3	DF	(Germany) GER	André Hoffmann	31	2	27+2	2	2	0
4	DF	(Ghana) GHA	Kasim Nuhu	15	2	11+2	1	1+1	1
5	DF	(Turkey) TUR	Kaan Ayhan	34	2	31	2	3	0
13	DF	(Germany) GER	Adam Bodzek	30	0	22+6	0	1+1	0
19	DF	(Denmark) DEN	Mathias Jørgensen	11	1	5+4	0	2	1
23	DF	(Germany) GER	Niko Gießelmann	28	1	22+3	1	3	0
25	DF	(Germany) GER	Matthias Zimmermann	33	2	29	1	3+1	1
26	DF	(Germany) GER	Diego Contento	0	0	0	0	0	0
29	DF	(Austria) AUT	Markus Suttner	22	0	16+5	0	1	0
32	DF	(Germany) GER	Robin Bormuth	3	0	2+1	0	0	0
39	DF	(Germany) GER	Jean Zimmer	19	0	8+9	0	1+1	0
40	DF	(Germany) GER	Johannes Bühler	0	0	0	0	0	0
Midfielders
6	MF	(United States) USA	Alfredo Morales	31	1	18+9	1	4	0
7	MF	(Germany) GER	Oliver Fink	16	0	8+6	0	2	0
8	MF	(Germany) GER	Aymen Barkok	5	0	1+2	0	1+1	0
10	MF	(Kosovo) KOS	Valon Berisha	13	0	12+1	0	0	0
11	MF	(Turkey) TUR	Kenan Karaman	21	6	16+4	6	0+1	0
14	MF	(Ghana) GHA	Kelvin Ofori	5	1	0+2	0	1+2	1
15	MF	(Germany) GER	Erik Thommy	37	6	25+9	6	3	0
18	MF	(Germany) GER	Thomas Pledl	6	0	0+5	0	0+1	0
22	MF	(Austria) AUT	Kevin Stöger	19	1	14+3	0	1+1	1
31	MF	(Germany) GER	Marcel Sobottka	21	0	8+10	0	2+1	0
Forwards
9	FW	(Poland) POL	Dawid Kownacki	6	0	1+4	0	1	0
20	FW	(Germany) GER	Steven Skrzybski	12	1	6+5	1	0+1	0
27	FW	(Ghana) GHA	Opoku Ampomah	16	2	5+7	0	2+2	2
28	FW	(Germany) GER	Rouwen Hennings	36	19	27+5	15	4	4
37	FW	(Ghana) GHA	Bernard Tekpetey	10	0	5+4	0	1	0
Players transferred out during the season
19	MF	(Croatia) CRO	Davor Lovren	0	0	0	0	0	0
34	MF	(England) ENG	Lewis Baker	9	0	7+1	0	1	0

Last updated: 27 June 2020
Source: Competitions
