= 2017–18 Fortuna Düsseldorf season =

Fortuna Düsseldorf
2017–18 season
- Chairman: Robert Schäfer
- Manager: Friedhelm Funkel
- Stadium: ESPRIT arena
- 2. Bundesliga: 1st
- DFB-Pokal: Second round
Home colours	Away colours	Third colours
- All statistics correct as of 15 September 2017.

The 2017–18 Fortuna Düsseldorf season was the 123rd season in the football club's history. For the 5th consecutive season, Düsseldorf played in the 2. Bundesliga. They also participated in this season's edition of the domestic cup, the DFB-Pokal. The season covers a period from 1 July 2017 to 30 June 2018.

== Players ==
=== Squad information ===
As of 31 January 2018

Note: Flags indicate national team as defined under FIFA eligibility rules; some limited exceptions apply. Players may hold more than one non-FIFA nationality.

No.	Pos.	Nation	Player
1	GK	GER	Michael Rensing
3	DF	GER	André Hoffmann
4	DF	GER	Julian Schauerte
5	DF	TUR	Kaan Ayhan
6	MF	GER	Florian Neuhaus (on loan from Borussia Mönchengladbach)
7	MF	GER	Oliver Fink (captain)
8	MF	USA	Jerome Kiesewetter
9	FW	BEL	Benito Raman
11	MF	GER	Axel Bellinghausen
13	DF	POL	Adam Bodzek
15	DF	GER	Lukas Schmitz
16	FW	NOR	Håvard Nielsen
18	DF	GER	Gökhan Gül
19	MF	CRO	Davor Lovren
21	FW	SWE	Emir Kujović

No.	Pos.	Nation	Player
23	DF	GER	Niko Gießelmann
24	MF	JPN	Justin Kinjo
25	MF	JPN	Genki Haraguchi (on loan from Hertha BSC)
27	MF	GER	Taylan Duman
28	FW	GER	Rouwen Hennings
30	GK	GER	Raphael Wolf
31	MF	GER	Marcel Sobottka
32	DF	GER	Robin Bormuth
33	MF	JPN	Takashi Usami (on loan from FC Augsburg)
35	FW	CRO	Karlo Majić
36	DF	GER	Anderson Lucoqui
38	GK	GER	Tim Wiesner
39	DF	GER	Jean Zimmer (on loan from VfB Stuttgart)
40	MF	CAN	Kianz Froese
—	DF	SEN	Jean Ndecky

== Competitions ==
Win Draw Loss

=== Bundesliga ===
==== League table ====
Pos	Team	Pld	W	D	L	GF	GA	GD	Pts	Promotion, qualification or relegation
1	Fortuna Düsseldorf (C, P)	34	19	6	9	57	44	+13	63	Promotion to Bundesliga
2	1. FC Nürnberg (P)	34	17	9	8	61	39	+22	60	Promotion to Bundesliga
3	Holstein Kiel	34	14	14	6	71	44	+27	56	Qualification for promotion play-offs
4	Arminia Bielefeld	34	12	12	10	51	47	+4	48	
5	Jahn Regensburg	34	14	6	14	53	53	0	48	

Source: DFB
Rules for classification: 1) Points; 2) Goal difference; 3) Goals scored
(C) Champions; (P) Promoted

==== Results summary ====
Overall								Home						Away					
Pld	W	D	L	GF	GA	GD	Pts	W	D	L	GF	GA	GD	W	D	L	GF	GA	GD
34	19	6	9	57	44	+13	63	10	4	3	30	20	+10	9	2	6	27	24	+3

Last updated: 13 May 2018.
Source: Bundesliga

==== Results by round ====
Round	1	2	3	4	5	6	7	8	9	10	11	12	13	14	15	16	17	18	19	20	21	22	23	24	25	26	27	28	29	30	31	32	33	34
Ground	H	A	H	A	H	A	H	A	H	A	H	A	H	A	H	A	H	A	H	A	H	A	H	A	H	A	H	A	H	A	H	A	H	A
Result	D	W	W	W	W	L	W	W	W	W	W	D	D	L	L	D	L	W	W	W	W	L	D	L	W	W	W	L	L	L	W	W	D	W
Position	7	4	3	1	1	3	1	1	1	1	1	2	2	2	2	2	3	1	1	1	1	1	1	1	1	1	1	1	1	1	1	1	2	1

Updated to match(es) played on 13 May 2018. Source: Bundesliga
A = Away; H = Home; W = Win; D = Draw; L = Loss

==== Matches ====
2. Bundesliga match details
Match	Date	Time	Opponent	Venue	Result F–A	Scorers	Attendance	Referee	Ref.
1	31 July 2017	20:30	Eintracht Braunschweig	H	2–2	Sobottka 9', Neuhaus 79'	25,492	Dingert	
2	6 August 2017	15:30	Erzgebirge Aue	A	2–0	Hennings 42', Sobottka 48'	9,150	Brych	
3	19 August 2017	13:00	1. FC Kaiserslautern	H	2–0	Neuhaus 76', Bebou 43'	25,227	Dankert	
4	27 August 2017	13:30	SV Sandhausen	A	2–1	Bebou 51', Hennings 90'	6,769	Heft	
5	10 September 2017	13:30	Union Berlin	H	3–2	Sobottka 17', Usami 84', Neuhaus 90'	26,341	Aarnink	
6	17 September 2017	13:30	Greuther Fürth	A	1–3	Gießelmann 62' pen.	8,535	Petersen	
7	20 September 2017	18:30	Jahn Regensburg	H	1–0	Kujović 54'	19,380	Kempter	
8	23 September 2017	13:00	FC St. Pauli	A	2–1	Usami 9', Hennings 23'	29,546	Brych	
9	2 October 2017	20:30	MSV Duisburg	H	3–1	Hennings 2', Zimmer 6', Raman 55'	41,764	Schröder	
10	14 October 2017	13:00	Arminia Bielefeld	A	2–0	Raman 35', Neuhaus 76'	21,554	Stieler	
11	20 October 2017	18:30	Darmstadt 98	H	1–0	Kujović 2'	27,674	Willenborg	
12	30 October 2017	20:30	VfL Bochum	A	0–0		27,599	Cortus	
13	5 November 2017	13:30	1. FC Heidenheim	H	2–2	Hennings 78', Raman 90+1'	23,956	Koslowski	
14	19 November 2017	13:30	FC Ingolstadt 04	A	0–1		11,648	Schlager	
15	27 November 2017	20:30	Dynamo Dresden	H	1–3	Raman 31'	22,602	Brand	
16	2 December 2017	13:00	Holstein Kiel	A	2–2	Raman 43', Hennings 85'	11,748	Petersen	
17	11 December 2017	20:30	1. FC Nürnberg	H	0–2		22,248	Rohde	
18	15 December 2017	18:30	Eintracht Braunschweig	A	1–0	Lovren 9'	19,725	Alt	
19	24 January 2018	20:30	Erzgebirge Aue	H	2–1	Raman 30', Hennings 70' pen.	19,617	Badstübner	
20	27 January 2018	13:00	1. FC Kaiserslautern	A	3–1	Haraguchi 64' pen., Raman 78', Schmitz 89'	21,739	Stieler	
21	2 February 2018	18:30	SV Sandhausen	H	1–0	Hoffmann 2'	23,288	Jöllenbeck	
22	10 February 2018	13:00	Union Berlin	A	1–3	Neuhaus 41'	22,012	Hartmann	
23	17 February 2018	13:00	Greuther Fürth	H	1–1	Usami 76'	23,849	Storks	
24	23 February 2018	18:30	Jahn Regensburg	A	3–4	Hennings 3', Raman 13', Usami 15'	10,963	Fritz	
25	4 March 2018	13:30	FC St. Pauli	H	2–1	Hoffmann 8, Usami 74'	37,208	Gerach	
26	11 March 2018	13:30	MSV Duisburg	A	2–1	Hennings 40', Usami 88'	28,000	Stegemann	
27	16 March 2018	18:30	Arminia Bielefeld	H	4–2	Hennings 31', Sobottka 57', Bodzek 68', Raman 71'	29,567	Jöllenbeck	
28	2 April 2018	20:30	Darmstadt 98	A	0–1		17,400	Reichel	
29	6 April 2018	18:30	VfL Bochum	H	1–2	Hennings 80' pen.	35,600	Zwayer	
30	15 April 2018	13:30	1. FC Heidenheim	A	1–3	Usami 51'	12,800	Dietz	
31	22 April 2018	13:30	FC Ingolstadt 04	H	3–0	Hennings 7', Gießelmann 39', Bormuth 65'	33,925	Gräfe	
32	28 April 2018	13:00	Dynamo Dresden	A	2–1	Neuhaus 9', Hennings 90'	30,953	Hartmann	
33	6 May 2018	15:30	Holstein Kiel	H	1–1	Raman 50'	50,000	Ittrich	
34	13 May 2018	15:30	1. FC Nürnberg	A	3–2	Usami 37', Gießelmann 59', Ayhan 90+1'	50,000	Steinhaus	

=== DFB-Pokal ===
DFB-Pokal match details
Round	Date	Time	Opponent	Venue	Result F–A	Scorers	Attendance	Referee	Ref.
First round	12 August 2017	18:30	Arminia Bielefeld	A	3–1 (a.e.t.)	Hennings 68', 96', Fink 120+1'	19,825	Osmers	
Second round	24 October 2017	18:30	Borussia Mönchengladbach	H	0–1		52,500	Gräfe	
