= Saffet Kaya =

Turkish footballer

Personal information
- Full name: Saffet Kaya
- Date of birth: 14 August 1981 (age 45)
- Place of birth: Recklinghausen, West Germany
- Position: Forward

Youth career
- –2000: Borussia Dortmund

Senior career*
Years	Team	Apps	(Gls)
2000–2001	Galatasaray	0	(0)
2001	Antalyaspor	1	(0)
- * Club domestic league appearances and goals

Saffet Kaya (born 14 August 1981) is a Turkish footballer. He made his Süper Lig debut on 18 August 2001. Kaya is an uncle of Kaan Ayhan.
