= Robert Schaefer =

Robert Schaefer may refer to:

- Robert Schaefer (footballer) (born 1972), Australian rules footballer
- Robert M. Schaefer (born 1930), American politician in the Washington House of Representatives
- Robert E. Schaefer, American architect and politician in the Idaho House of Representatives
- Robert J. Schaefer (1925–2006), American architect in Kansas
- Bob Schaefer (born 1944), American baseball coach and manager

== See also ==
- Robert Shafer (disambiguation)
- Roberto Schaefer (fl. 1980s–2020s), American cinematographer
- Bob Schaffer (born 1962), U.S. representative from Colorado
- Robert Schäfer (born 1976), German attorney and football manager
