= Robert Shafer =

Robert Shafer may refer to:

- Robert L. Shafer (born 1932), American lawyer, lobbyist, and diplomat
- Robert Shafer (conductor) (born 1946), American conductor and classical composer
- Robert R. Shafer (born 1958), American actor

== See also ==
- Robert Schaefer (disambiguation)
- Bob Schaefer (born 1944), American baseball executive and coach
- Bob Schafer (1933–2005), American basketball player
- Bob Schaffer (born 1962), American politician and businessman
- Bob Schieffer (born 1937), American television journalist
- Robert Schäfer (born 1976), German attorney and football manager
- Robert H. Shaffer (1915–2017), American academic administrator
- Robert Sheaffer (born 1949), American freelance writer and UFO skeptic
