= André Hoffmann (footballer) =

German footballer (born 1993)

- Hoffmann with CSKA 1948 in 2026

Personal information
- Date of birth: 28 February 1993 (age 33)
- Place of birth: Essen, Germany
- Height: 1.90 m (6 ft 3 in)
- Position: Defensive midfielder

Team information
- Current team: CSKA 1948
- Number: 4

Youth career
- SuS Haarzopf
- 2000–2002: Phönix Essen
- 2002–2011: MSV Duisburg

Senior career*
| Years | Team | Apps | (Gls) |
| 2011 | MSV Duisburg II | 1 | (0) |
| 2011–2013 | MSV Duisburg | 37 | (1) |
| 2013–2017 | Hannover 96 | 47 | (2) |
| 2015 | Hannover 96 II | 9 | (0) |
| 2017–2025 | Fortuna Düsseldorf | 175 | (10) |
| 2025– | CSKA 1948 | 19 | (1) |

International career
| 2008–2009 | Germany U16 | 5 | (1) |
| 2009–2010 | Germany U17 | 12 | (2) |
| 2010–2011 | Germany U18 | 7 | (0) |
| 2011–2012 | Germany U19 | 7 | (0) |
| 2012 | Germany U20 | 2 | (0) |
| 2013 | Germany U21 | 4 | (0) |
- * Club domestic league appearances and goals as of 11 June 2026

André Hoffmann (born 28 February 1993) is a German professional footballer who plays as a defensive midfielder or central defender for Bulgarian First League club CSKA 1948 Sofia.

== Career ==
Until 2010 he played in the youth system of MSV Duisburg before he was promoted in the summer of 2010.

On 3 January 2013, he left MSV Duisburg for Hannover 96. On 20 April 2013, he scored his first goal for Hannover 96 in a 1–6 defeat against FC Bayern Munich.

Hoffmann joined Fortuna Düsseldorf in 2017 and helped the club achieve promotion to the Bundesliga during the 2017-18 season after finishing top of the 2. Bundesliga.

On 8 July 2022, Düsseldorf head coach Daniel Thioune appointed him as team captain ahead of the 2022-23 campaign.

== Career statistics ==
As of 11 June 2026

Appearances and goals by club, season and competition
| Club | Season | League | | | DfB-Pokal | | Total | |
| Club | Season | Division | Apps | Goals | Apps | Goals | Apps | Goals |
|---|---|---|---|---|---|---|---|---|
| MSV Duisburg | 2011–12 | 2. Bundesliga | 24 | 1 | 0 | 0 | 24 | 1 |
| MSV Duisburg | 2012–13 | 2. Bundesliga | 13 | 0 | 2 | 0 | 15 | 0 |
| MSV Duisburg | Total | | 37 | 1 | 2 | 0 | 39 | 1 |
| Hannover 96 | 2012–13 | Bundesliga | 16 | 2 | – | | 16 | 2 |
| Hannover 96 | 2013–14 | Bundesliga | 23 | 0 | 1 | 0 | 24 | 0 |
| Hannover 96 | 2014–15 | Bundesliga | 0 | 0 | 0 | 0 | 0 | 0 |
| Hannover 96 | 2015–16 | Bundesliga | 8 | 0 | 0 | 0 | 8 | 0 |
| Hannover 96 | 2016–17 | 2. Bundesliga | 0 | 0 | 0 | 0 | 0 | 0 |
| Hannover 96 | Total | | 47 | 2 | 1 | 0 | 48 | 2 |
| Hannover 96 II | 2014–15 | Regionalliga Nord | 1 | 0 | – | | 1 | 0 |
| Hannover 96 II | 2015–16 | Regionalliga Nord | 4 | 0 | – | | 4 | 0 |
| Hannover 96 II | 2016–17 | Regionalliga Nord | 4 | 0 | – | | 4 | 0 |
| Fortuna Düsseldorf | 2016–17 | 2. Bundesliga | 6 | 1 | – | | 6 | 1 |
| Fortuna Düsseldorf | 2017–18 | 2. Bundesliga | 20 | 2 | 2 | 0 | 22 | 2 |
| Fortuna Düsseldorf | 2018–19 | Bundesliga | 13 | 0 | 2 | 0 | 15 | 0 |
| Fortuna Düsseldorf | 2019–20 | Bundesliga | 29 | 2 | 2 | 0 | 31 | 2 |
| Fortuna Düsseldorf | 2020–21 | 2. Bundesliga | 22 | 1 | 2 | 0 | 24 | 1 |
| Fortuna Düsseldorf | 2021–22 | 2. Bundesliga | 19 | 1 | 1 | 0 | 20 | 1 |
| Fortuna Düsseldorf | 2022–23 | 2. Bundesliga | 23 | 2 | 2 | 1 | 25 | 3 |
| Fortuna Düsseldorf | 2023–24 | 2. Bundesliga | 14 | 1 | 3 | 0 | 17 | 1 |
| Fortuna Düsseldorf | 2024–25 | 2. Bundesliga | 29 | 0 | | | 29 | 0 |
| Fortuna Düsseldorf | Total | | 175 | 10 | 11 | 1 | 189 | 11 |
| CSKA 1948 Sofia | 2025–26 | efbet League | 19 | 1 | 1 | 0 | 20 | 1 |
| Career total | | | 290 | 13 | 15 | 1 | 305 | 15 |

== Honours ==
Individual

- Fritz Walter Medal U17 Silver: 2010
- Fritz Walter Medal U19 Silver: 2012
