= Benito Raman =

Belgian footballer (born 1994)

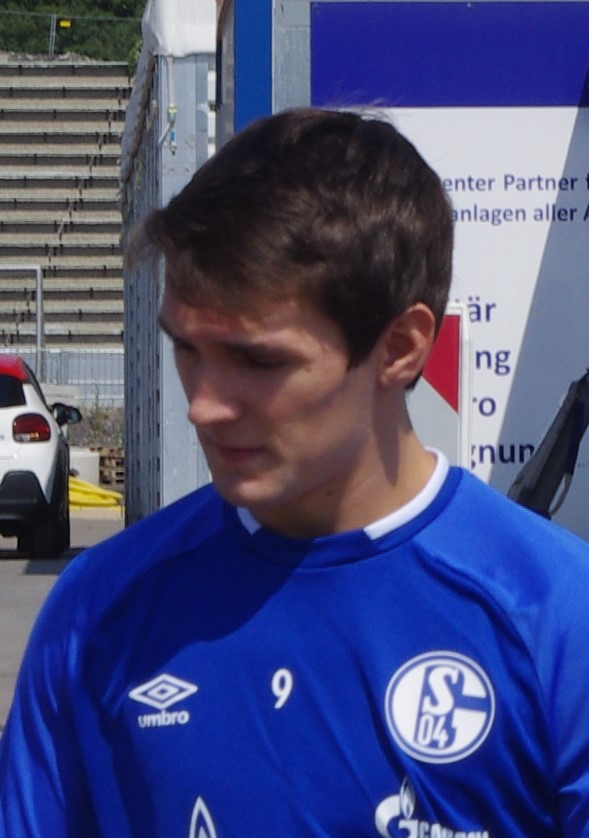
- Raman with Schalke 04 in 2020

Personal information
- Date of birth: 7 November 1994 (age 32)
- Place of birth: Ghent, Belgium
- Height: 1.72 m (5 ft 8 in)
- Position: Forward

Team information
- Current team: Mechelen
- Number: 14

Youth career
- 1998: Cercle Melle
- 1998–2002: SK Munkzwalm
- 2002–2011: Gent

Senior career*
Years	Team	Apps	(Gls)
2011–2016	Gent	55	(11)
2013	→ Beerschot (loan)	11	(5)
2013–2014	→ Kortrijk (loan)	30	(4)
2016	→ Sint-Truiden (loan)	10	(1)
2016–2018	Standard Liège	22	(4)
2017–2018	→ Fortuna Düsseldorf (loan)	28	(10)
2018–2019	Fortuna Düsseldorf	30	(10)
2019–2021	Schalke 04	50	(6)
2021–2024	Anderlecht	67	(14)
2024	Samsunspor	11	(0)
2024–	Mechelen	61	(16)

International career^{‡}
2009	Belgium U15	7	(6)
2009–2010	Belgium U17	20	(6)
2011	Belgium U18	2	(0)
2012	Belgium U19	1	(0)
2014–2016	Belgium U21	5	(1)
2019	Belgium	1	(0)
- * Club domestic league appearances and goals as of 31 May 2026 ‡ National team caps and goals as of 22:12, 9 September 2019 (UTC)

Benito Raman (born 7 November 1994) is a Belgian professional footballer who plays as a forward for Belgian Pro League club Mechelen.

== Club career ==
=== Youth ===
At the age of 4 he started playing football at Cercle Melle. He stayed there for six months. In 2001, at a local tournament organised by KFC Semmerzake, Raman was named the best player of the tournament. This caught the attention from Gent.

=== Gent ===
After eight years playing in Gent's youth teams, Raman made his debut against Zulte Waregem, replacing Tim Smolders in the 91st minute. In February 2012, Raman chose to stay in Ghent, despite reported interest from Inter Milan, Aston Villa and Hoffenheim.

=== Standard Liège ===
On 27 July 2016, Raman signed a four-year deal with Standard Liège.

=== Fortuna Düsseldorf ===
On 31 August 2017, Raman was lent to Fortuna Düsseldorf until 2018.

In January 2018, the loan was extended by another season until summer 2019.

In March 2018, Fortuna Düsseldorf announced they had exercised the option to sign Raman permanently on a contract until 2022, for a fee of around €1.5 million.

=== Schalke 04 ===
On 5 July 2019, Raman joined Schalke 04 on a five-year contract, for a fee of around €6.5 million.

=== Anderlecht ===
On 15 July 2021, Anderlecht announced the signing of Raman on a three-year contract, for a fee of €3 million.

=== Samsunspor ===
On 1 February 2024, Anderlecht announced Raman's transfer to Samsunspor in Turkey.

=== Mechelen ===
On 23 August 2024, Raman signed a two-season contract with Mechelen.

== International career ==
Raman was born in Belgium and is of Spanish descent.

He represented Belgium as a youth international at every age group from the under-17's to the under-21's.

On 9 September 2019, Raman made his debut for the senior Belgium national team, coming on as a 90th-minute substitute against Scotland in a Euro 2020 qualifier that saw Belgium run out 4–0 winners at Hampden Park.

== Career statistics ==
=== Club ===
As of match played on 31 June 2023

Appearances and goals by club, season and competition
Club	Season	League			National cup (Note: Includes Belgian Cup, DFB-Pokal)		Europe		Other		Total	
Club	Season	Division	Apps	Goals	Apps	Goals	Apps	Goals	Apps	Goals	Apps	Goals
Gent	2011–12	First Division A	7	0	0	0	—		—		7	0
Gent	2012–13	First Division A	4	0	1	1	1 (Note: Appearances in UEFA Europa League)	0	—		6	1
Gent	2014–15	First Division A	31	8	4	1	—		—		35	9
Gent	2015–16	First Division A	13	3	2	2	4 (Note: Appearances in UEFA Champions League)	0	1 (Note: Appearances in Belgian Super Cup)	0	20	5
Gent	Total		55	11	7	4	5	0	1	0	68	15
Beerschot (loan)	2012–13	First Division A	11	5	0	0	—		—		11	5
Kortrijk (loan)	2013–14	First Division A	30	4	3	1	—		—		33	5
Sint-Truiden (loan)	2015–16	First Division A	10	1	0	0	—		—		10	1
Standard Liège	2016–17	First Division A	21	4	1	1	5	1	4 (Note: Appearances in Europa League play-offs)	0	31	6
Standard Liège	2017–18	First Division A	1	0	0	0	—		—		1	0
Standard Liège	Total		22	4	1	1	5	1	4	0	32	6
Fortuna Düsseldorf	2017–18	2. Bundesliga	28	10	1	0	—		—		29	10
Fortuna Düsseldorf	2018–19	Bundesliga	30	10	2	1	—		—		32	11
Fortuna Düsseldorf	Total		58	20	3	1	—		—		61	21
Schalke 04	2019–20	Bundesliga	25	4	3	3	—		—		28	7
Schalke 04	2020–21	Bundesliga	25	2	2	3	—		—		27	5
Schalke 04	Total		50	6	5	6	—		—		55	12
Anderlecht	2021–22	Belgian Pro League	35	9	5	1	4 (Note: Appearances in UEFA Europa Conference League)	2	—		44	12
Anderlecht	2022–23	Belgian Pro League	22	5	1	0	11	1	—		34	6
Anderlecht	Total		57	15	6	1	15	3	—		78	18
Career total			293	65	25	14	25	4	5	0	348	83

=== International ===
As of match played on 9 September 2019

Appearances and goals by national team and year
National team	Year	Apps	Goals
Belgium	2019	1	0
Total		1	0

== Honours ==
Gent

- Belgian Pro League: 2014–15
- Belgian Super Cup: 2015

Fortuna Düsseldorf

- 2. Bundesliga: 2017–18
