= Michael Rensing =

German footballer (born 1984)

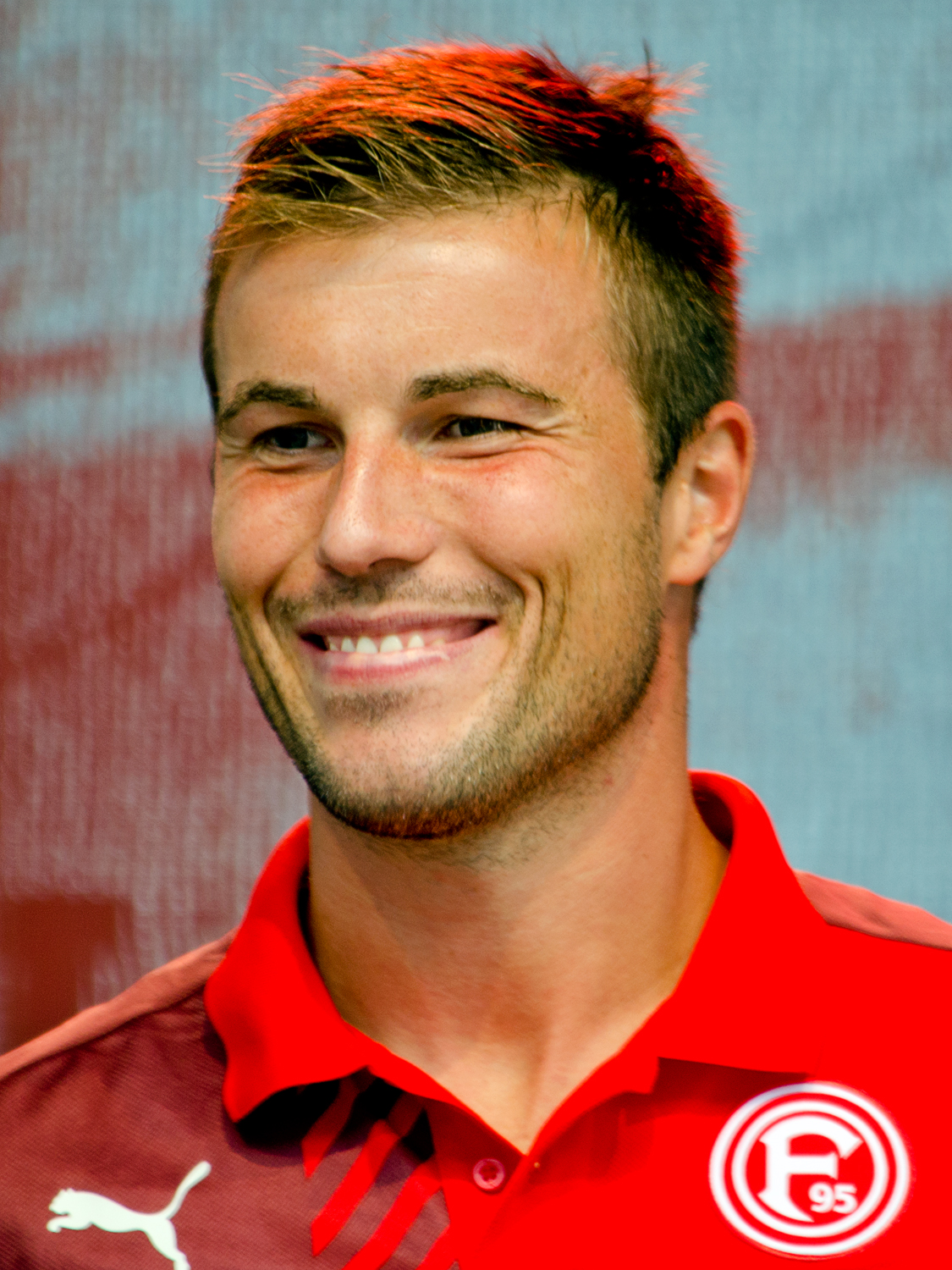
- Rensing with Fortuna Düsseldorf in 2015

Personal information
- Date of birth: 14 May 1984 (age 42)
- Place of birth: Lingen, West Germany
- Height: 1.90 m (6 ft 3 in)
- Position: Goalkeeper

Youth career
- 1988–2000: TuS Lingen
- 2000–2002: Bayern Munich

Senior career*
| Years | Team | Apps | (Gls) |
| 2002–2010 | Bayern Munich II | 114 | (0) |
| 2003–2010 | Bayern Munich | 53 | (0) |
| 2010–2012 | 1. FC Köln | 49 | (0) |
| 2012 | Bayer Leverkusen II | 1 | (0) |
| 2012–2013 | Bayer Leverkusen | 2 | (0) |
| 2013–2020 | Fortuna Düsseldorf | 132 | (0) |
| 2017–2020 | Fortuna Düsseldorf II | 4 | (0) |
| Total | | 355 | (0) |

International career
| 2004–2006 | Germany U21 | 18 | (0) |
- * Club domestic league appearances and goals as of 27 June 2020

Michael Rensing (born 14 May 1984) is a German former footballer who played as a goalkeeper. He has played for Bayern Munich, 1. FC Köln, Bayer Leverkusen and Fortuna Düsseldorf.

== Club career ==
=== Early career ===
Born to a German father and a Serbian mother, Rensing joined Bayern in 2000 from TuS Lingen, and went on to develop his talent in the club's youth sides.

He made two appearances for the reserve side in the 2001–02 season and spending the 2002–03 season in the Regionalliga Süd, making 34 league appearances and a cup appearance, and won a place in the UEFA Champions League squad at the start of the following campaign as he moved up the Bayern pecking order to become Oliver Kahn's deputy.

=== Bayern Munich ===
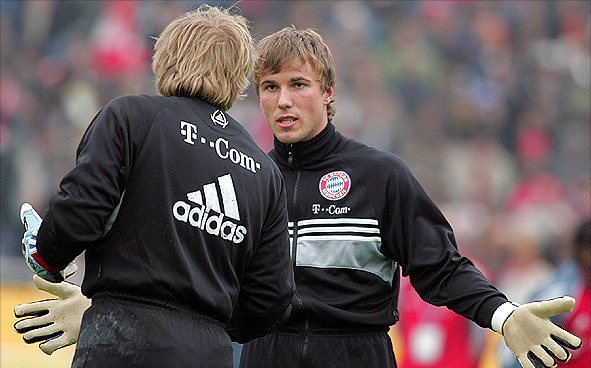
Rensing (right) and Oliver Kahn in 2006

Rensing made his Bundesliga debut on 21 February 2004, playing the entire 90 minutes of the 1–0 home win against Hamburger SV. He also made an appearance against Schalke 04.

Rensing saw action in four Bundesliga matches and two cup matches in 2004–05 season and six Bundesliga matches in the 2005–06 season, and saw his first Champions League nod for an injured Oliver Kahn against Milan on 21 February 2006 (Milan keeper Dida was injured during the match, so both sides finished with reserve goalkeepers in goal), which ended in a 1–1 draw. On 15 April 2006, Rensing was involved in a strange incident prior to a match against Arminia Bielefeld. He took a warm-up shot that struck goalkeeper Oliver Kahn blackening his eye and forcing him to sit out the game. Rensing played in Kahn's place and Bayern went on to win the contest 2–0. In the 2006–07 season, he made a Bundesliga appearance against Borussia Mönchengladbach, two cup appearances, a league cup appearance against Schalke 04, and a Champions League match against Milan.

As Kahn moved towards the end of his career, Rensing gradually received more playing time, covering for Kahn in his final 2007–08 season on 10 occasions in the Bundesliga, once in the Cup, once in the league cup, and six in the UEFA Cup. Following Kahn's retirement in 2008, Rensing was given a chance as Bayern's first-choice goalkeeper, but was unable to cement his spot. He made 26 appearances in the Bundesliga, four cup matches, seven Champions League matches, and three reserve team matches. Following a poor start to the 2009–10 season, his experienced teammate Hans-Jörg Butt replaced him as the Bavarian club's first-choice goalkeeper. Rensing had played on matchdays one, two, and three. Although Rensing made a half-time substitute appearance for the unwell Butt in a 3–2 win at Werder Bremen on 23 January 2010 and made three appearances in the DFB-Pokal, and three matches for the reserve team. Bayern opted not to renew his contract at the end of the season.

In November 2010, Rensing joined Leicester City on trial but rejected the subsequent contract offer.

=== 1. FC Köln ===
On 21 December 2010, Rensing moved to 1. FC Köln on a six-month contract. He made 17 league appearances in the 2010–11 season. Following his half-season at 1. FC Köln, Rensing was voted the No.3 keeper in Germany by kicker sports magazine. Due to his strong performance, Rensing's contract with 1. FC Köln was extended two years to 2013. He made 32 league appearances and an appearance in the Cup during the 2011–12 season. However, he was released by Köln upon the club's relegation in 2012. He finished his Köln career with 49 league appearances.

=== Bayer Leverkusen ===
Rensing signed for Bayer 04 Leverkusen in August 2012, to serve as backup to Bernd Leno. In his only season for the club, he played in two league matches and a cup match for the first team and a league match for the reserve team.

=== Fortuna Düsseldorf ===
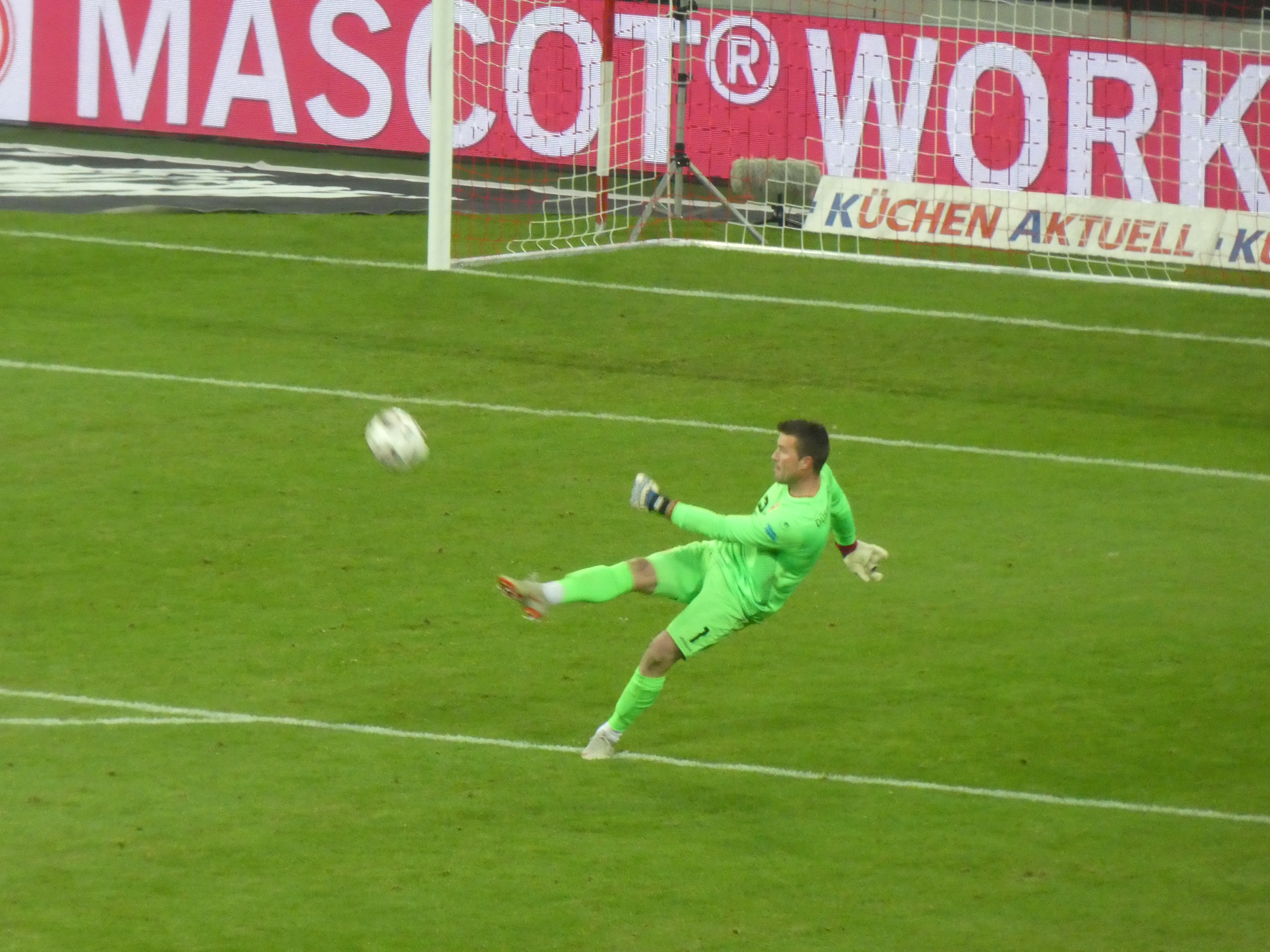
Rensing in 2018

Since 1 July 2013, Rensing has played for Fortuna Düsseldorf. Before the first match of the season Rensing stormed out of training and was thus dropped from the team for that match. The argument was concerning Fabian Giefer being selected as first-choice keeper above him. Because of this he was told that he would not be picked for league games due to his "childish reaction" over the incident. He ended up playing in five matches during the 2013–14 season. In the 2014–15 season, Rensing has played in 12 of the first 13 games of the season in the 2. Bundesliga, and has also played in the single DFB-Pokal game. He finished the season with 24 league matches played. Rensing continued being the first choice keeper during the 2015–16 season with the exception of the first round cup match against Rot Weiss Essen where Lars Unnerstall played. Rensing finished the 2016–17 season with 34 league appearances and two cup appearances. Rensing started the 2017–18 season by starting the first three league matches and the opening round of the German Cup. Rensing picked up an injury against 1. FC Kaiserslautern.

== International career ==
Having been Germany's number one goalkeeper at the U-19 level, Rensing joined the hosts' squad at the 2004 UEFA European Under-21 Championship finals, although he did not get off the bench. However, he had since become the first choice at U-21, helping his team qualify for the 2006 Euro Under-21 Championship. He is eligible to play both for Germany and Serbia.

== Career statistics ==
As of matches played on 19 June 2018.

Appearances and goals by club, season and competition
| Club | Season | League | | | Cup | | League Cup | | Continental | | Total | | Ref. |
| Club | Season | League | Apps | Goals | Apps | Goals | Apps | Goals | Apps | Goals | Apps | Goals | Ref. |
|---|---|---|---|---|---|---|---|---|---|---|---|---|---|
| Bayern Munich II | 2001–02 | Regionalliga Süd | 2 | 0 | — | | — | | — | | 2 | 0 | |
| Bayern Munich II | 2002–03 | Regionalliga Süd | 34 | 0 | 1 | 0 | — | | — | | 35 | 0 | |
| Bayern Munich II | 2003–04 | Regionalliga Süd | 15 | 0 | — | | — | | — | | 15 | 0 | |
| Bayern Munich II | 2004–05 | Regionalliga Süd | 18 | 0 | 4 | 0 | — | | — | | 22 | 0 | |
| Bayern Munich II | 2005–06 | Regionalliga Süd | 22 | 0 | — | | — | | — | | 22 | 0 | |
| Bayern Munich II | 2006–07 | Regionalliga Süd | 20 | 0 | — | | — | | — | | 20 | 0 | |
| Bayern Munich II | 2009–10 | 3. Liga | 3 | 0 | — | | — | | — | | 3 | 0 | |
| Bayern Munich II | Totals | | 114 | 0 | 5 | 0 | — | | — | | 119 | 0 | — |
| Bayern Munich | 2003–04 | Bundesliga | 2 | 0 | 0 | 0 | 0 | 0 | 0 | 0 | 2 | 0 | |
| Bayern Munich | 2004–05 | Bundesliga | 4 | 0 | 2 | 0 | 0 | 0 | 0 | 0 | 6 | 0 | |
| Bayern Munich | 2005–06 | Bundesliga | 6 | 0 | 0 | 0 | 1 | 0 | 1 | 0 | 8 | 0 | |
| Bayern Munich | 2006–07 | Bundesliga | 1 | 0 | 2 | 0 | 1 | 0 | 1 | 0 | 5 | 0 | |
| Bayern Munich | 2007–08 | Bundesliga | 10 | 0 | 1 | 0 | 1 | 0 | 6 | 0 | 18 | 0 | |
| Bayern Munich | 2008–09 | Bundesliga | 26 | 0 | 4 | 0 | — | | 7 | 0 | 37 | 0 | |
| Bayern Munich | 2009–10 | Bundesliga | 4 | 0 | 3 | 0 | — | | 0 | 0 | 7 | 0 | |
| Bayern Munich | Totals | | 53 | 0 | 12 | 0 | 3 | 0 | 15 | 0 | 83 | 0 | — |
| 1. FC Köln | 2010–11 | Bundesliga | 17 | 0 | 0 | 0 | — | | — | | 17 | 0 | |
| 1. FC Köln | 2011–12 | Bundesliga | 32 | 0 | 1 | 0 | — | | — | | 33 | 0 | |
| 1. FC Köln | Totals | | 49 | 0 | 1 | 0 | — | | — | | 50 | 0 | — |
| Bayer Leverkusen | 2012–13 | Bundesliga | 2 | 0 | 1 | 0 | — | | 1 | 0 | 4 | 0 | |
| Bayer Leverkusen II | 2012–13 | Regionalliga West | 1 | 0 | — | | — | | — | | 1 | 0 | |
| Fortuna Düsseldorf | 2013–14 | 2. Bundesliga | 5 | 0 | 0 | 0 | — | | — | | 5 | 0 | |
| Fortuna Düsseldorf | 2014–15 | 2. Bundesliga | 24 | 0 | 1 | 0 | — | | — | | 25 | 0 | |
| Fortuna Düsseldorf | 2015–16 | 2. Bundesliga | 34 | 0 | 0 | 0 | — | | — | | 34 | 0 | |
| Fortuna Düsseldorf | 2016–17 | 2. Bundesliga | 34 | 0 | 2 | 0 | — | | — | | 36 | 0 | |
| Fortuna Düsseldorf | 2017–18 | 2. Bundesliga | 3 | 0 | 1 | 0 | — | | — | | 4 | 0 | |
| Fortuna Düsseldorf | 2018–19 | Bundesliga | 32 | 0 | 1 | 0 | — | | — | | 33 | 0 | |
| Fortuna Düsseldorf | 2019–20 | Bundesliga | 0 | 0 | 0 | 0 | — | | — | | 0 | 0 | |
| Fortuna Düsseldorf | Totals | | 132 | 0 | 5 | 0 | — | | — | | 137 | 0 | — |
| Fortuna Düsseldorf II | 2017–18 | Regionalliga West | 4 | 0 | — | | — | | — | | 4 | 0 | |
| Career totals | | | 355 | 0 | 24 | 0 | 3 | 0 | 16 | 0 | 398 | 0 | — |

== Honours ==
Bayern Munich

- Bundesliga: 2004–05, 2005–06, 2007–08, 2009–10
- DFB-Pokal: 2004–05, 2005–06, 2007–08, 2009–10
- DFB-Ligapokal: 2007
- UEFA Champions League runner-up: 2009–10
