= Niko Gießelmann =

German footballer

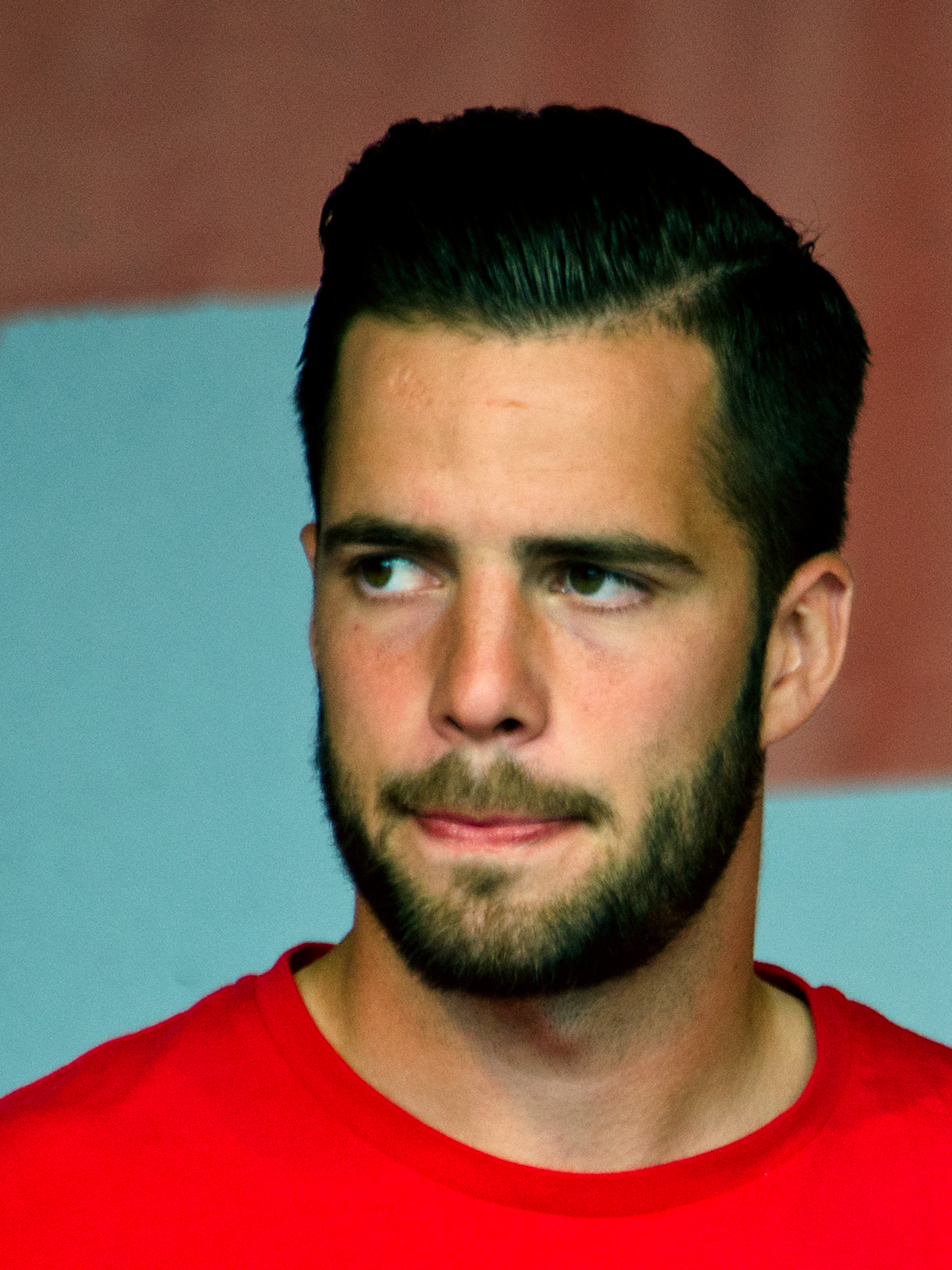
- Gießelmann in 2019

Personal information
- Date of birth: 26 September 1991 (age 35)
- Place of birth: Hanover, Germany
- Height: 1.82 m (6 ft 0 in)
- Position: Left-back

Team information
- Current team: Hannover 96 II
- Number: 23

Youth career
- 1995–2005: TSV Godshorn
- 2005–2007: SC Langenhagen
- 2007–2010: Hannover 96

Senior career*
| Years | Team | Apps | (Gls) |
| 2010–2013 | Hannover 96 II | 74 | (15) |
| 2012 | Hannover 96 | 0 | (0) |
| 2013–2017 | Greuther Fürth | 125 | (7) |
| 2017–2020 | Fortuna Düsseldorf | 88 | (4) |
| 2020–2023 | Union Berlin | 67 | (3) |
| 2023–2025 | Greuther Fürth | 36 | (1) |
| 2025–2026 | TSV Godshorn | 10 | (2) |
| 2026– | Hannover 96 II | 6 | (0) |
- * Club domestic league appearances and goals as of 22 September 2026

Niko Gießelmann (born 26 September 1991) is a German professional footballer who plays as a left-back for Regionalliga Nord club Hannover 96 II.

== Career ==
Gießelmann joined 2. Bundesliga side Greuther Fürth on a free transfer in summer 2013, signing a three-year contract until 2016.

In June 2017, Gießelmann moved to league rivals Fortuna Düsseldorf on a three-year deal.

In July 2020, after his contract with Fortuna Düsseldorf had expired, Gießelmann signed for Union Berlin.

On 6 September 2023, Gießelmann returned to Greuther Fürth, signing a two-year contract.

== Career statistics ==
As of match played 27 May 2023

Appearances and goals by club, season and competition
| Club | Season | League | | | National Cup | | Europe | | Other | | Total | |
| Club | Season | Division | Apps | Goals | Apps | Goals | Apps | Goals | Apps | Goals | Apps | Goals |
|---|---|---|---|---|---|---|---|---|---|---|---|---|
| Hannover 96 II | 2010–11 | Regionalliga Nord | 15 | 0 | — | | — | | 0 | 0 | 15 | 0 |
| Hannover 96 II | 2011–12 | Regionalliga Nord | 27 | 5 | — | | — | | 0 | 0 | 27 | 5 |
| Hannover 96 II | 2012–13 | Regionalliga Nord | 32 | 10 | — | | — | | 0 | 0 | 32 | 10 |
| Hannover 96 II | Total | | 74 | 15 | 0 | 0 | — | | 0 | 0 | 74 | 15 |
| Greuther Fürth | 2013–14 | 2. Bundesliga | 32 | 2 | 1 | 0 | — | | 1 (Note: Appearance(s) in Bundesliga promotion play-offs) | 0 | 34 | 2 |
| Greuther Fürth | 2014–15 | 2. Bundesliga | 31 | 4 | 2 | 0 | — | | — | | 33 | 4 |
| Greuther Fürth | 2015–16 | 2. Bundesliga | 31 | 1 | 1 | 0 | — | | — | | 32 | 1 |
| Greuther Fürth | 2016–17 | 2. Bundesliga | 31 | 0 | 2 | 0 | — | | — | | 33 | 0 |
| Greuther Fürth | Total | | 125 | 7 | 6 | 0 | 0 | 0 | 1 | 0 | 132 | 7 |
| Fortuna Düsseldorf | 2017–18 | 2. Bundesliga | 33 | 3 | 2 | 0 | — | | — | | 35 | 3 |
| Fortuna Düsseldorf | 2018–19 | Bundesliga | 30 | 0 | 2 | 0 | — | | — | | 32 | 0 |
| Fortuna Düsseldorf | 2019–20 | Bundesliga | 25 | 1 | 3 | 0 | — | | — | | 28 | 1 |
| Fortuna Düsseldorf | Total | | 88 | 4 | 7 | 0 | 0 | 0 | 0 | 0 | 95 | 4 |
| Union Berlin | 2020–21 | Bundesliga | 13 | 0 | 2 | 0 | — | | — | | 15 | 0 |
| Union Berlin | 2021–22 | Bundesliga | 28 | 3 | 3 | 0 | 6 (Note: Appearance(s) in UEFA Europa Conference League) | 0 | — | | 37 | 3 |
| Union Berlin | 2022–23 | Bundesliga | 26 | 0 | 3 | 0 | 7 (Note: Appearance(s) in UEFA Europa League) | 0 | — | | 36 | 0 |
| Union Berlin | Total | | 67 | 3 | 8 | 0 | 13 | 0 | 0 | 0 | 88 | 3 |
| Career total | | | 354 | 29 | 21 | 0 | 13 | 0 | 1 | 0 | 389 | 28 |
