= Kaan Ayhan =

Turkish footballer (born 1994)

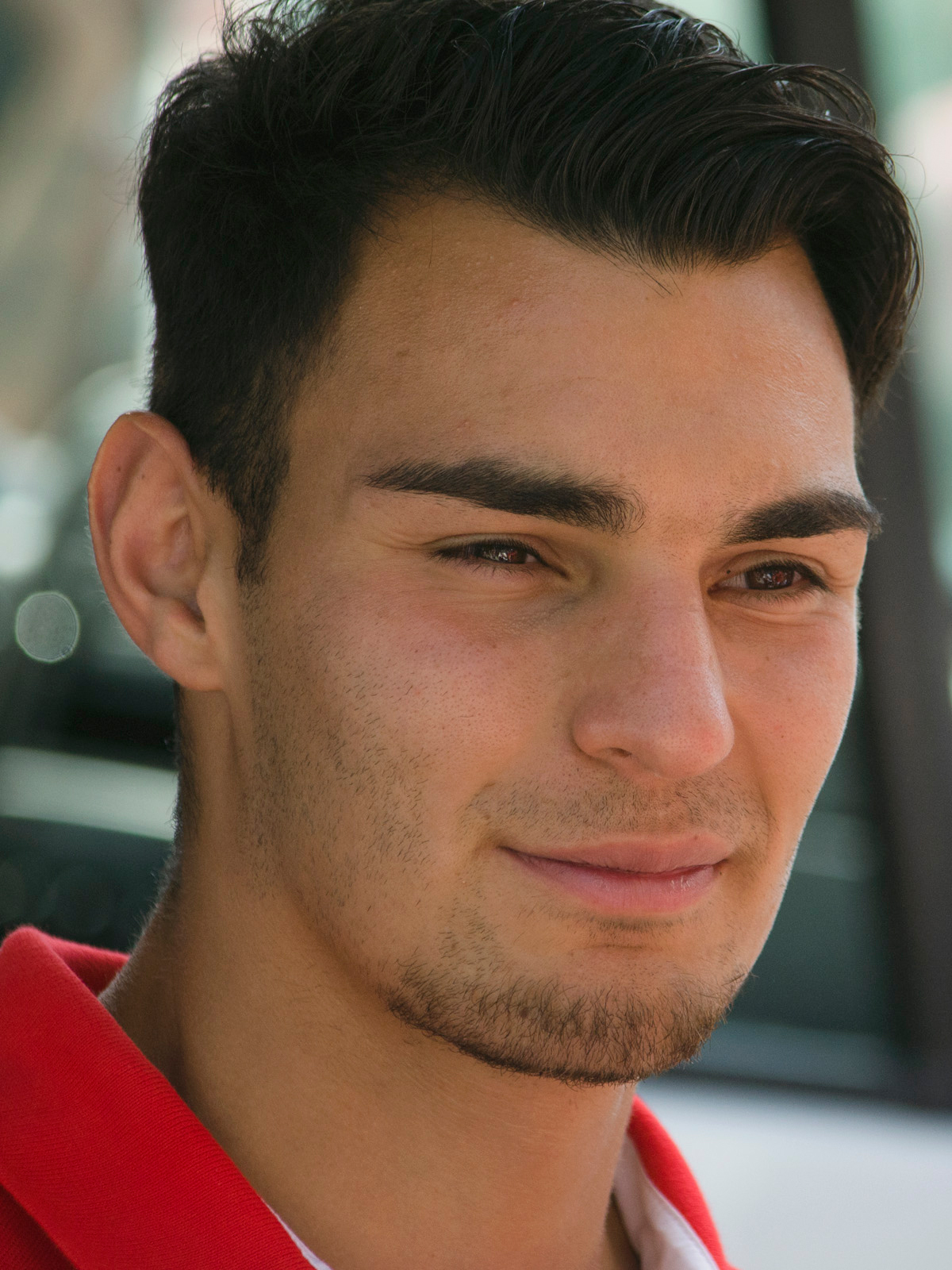
- Ayhan with Fortuna Düsseldorf in 2019

Personal information
- Full name: Kaan Ayhan
- Date of birth: 10 November 1994 (age 32)
- Place of birth: Gelsenkirchen, Germany
- Height: 1.85 m (6 ft 1 in)
- Position: Defender

Team information
- Current team: Galatasaray
- Number: 23

Youth career
- 1999–2013: Schalke 04

Senior career*
| Years | Team | Apps | (Gls) |
| 2013 | Schalke 04 II | 3 | (0) |
| 2013–2016 | Schalke 04 | 30 | (1) |
| 2016 | → Eintracht Frankfurt (loan) | 2 | (0) |
| 2016–2020 | Fortuna Düsseldorf | 113 | (8) |
| 2020–2023 | Sassuolo | 52 | (1) |
| 2023 | → Galatasaray (loan) | 5 | (0) |
| 2023– | Galatasaray | 84 | (3) |

International career^{‡}
| 2009 | Turkey U17 | 2 | (0) |
| 2009–2010 | Germany U16 | 6 | (0) |
| 2010–2011 | Germany U17 | 20 | (3) |
| 2012 | Germany U18 | 2 | (0) |
| 2013–2015 | Turkey U21 | 8 | (1) |
| 2016– | Turkey | 74 | (6) |
Medal record
Representing Germany
Men's football
FIFA U-17 World Cup
| Third place | 2011 Mexico |
- * Club domestic league appearances and goals as of 10 June 2026 ‡ National team caps and goals as of 25 June 2025

Kaan Ayhan (born 10 November 1994) is a professional footballer who plays as a defender for Süper Lig club Galatasaray. Born in Germany, he plays for the Turkey national team.

== Club career ==
=== Schalke 04 ===
Ayhan joined Schalke 04's youth academy when he was 4 years old. On 18 January 2012, he signed a professional contract with Schalke 04 that would last until 30 June 2015. Ayhan was assigned a number 24 shirt. Ayhan made his debut against FC Augsburg in a 4–1 win on 5 October 2013, coming on as a substitute for Ádám Szalai. On 3 May 2014, Ayhan scored his first Bundesliga goal in the 13th minute of a 2–0 victory at SC Freiburg.

In January 2016, Ayhan joined Eintracht Frankfurt on loan from Schalke for the second half of the season. Frankfurt secured the option of signing him permanently, however, the fixed transfer fee was reported as being too high for a permanent signing to be likely.

=== Fortuna Düsseldorf ===
On 31 August 2016, Ayhan left Schalke 04 after 17 years at the club to join 2. Bundesliga side Fortuna Düsseldorf.

On 13 May 2017 Ayhan scored the third goal in a 3-2 for win over 1. FC Nürnberg, securing the 2017–18 2. Bundesliga title for Fortuna Düsseldorf.

=== Sassuolo ===
On 16 August 2020, Ayhan joined Serie A club Sassuolo.

=== Galatasaray ===
On 28 January 2023, Galatasaray announced the official negotiations for the temporary transfer of Kaan Ayhan from Sassuolo till the end of the season. On 30 January 2023, the transfer was confirmed by Sassuolo as an initial loan with an obligation to buy.

Ayhan became a champion in the Süper Lig in the 2022–23 season with the Galatasaray team. Defeating Ankaragücü 4–1 away in the match played in the 36th week on 30 May 2023, Galatasaray secured the lead with 2 weeks before the end and won the 23rd championship in its history.

Following the season, it was announced that Galatasaray had triggered the buy option on Ayhan's loan deal at the cost of €2.8 million.

== International career ==
A Turkish-German, Ayhan has been capped by both Germany and Turkey junior national teams. In October 2013, Ayhan was selected for the Turkey under-21 squad. He was called up by manager Fatih Terim for Turkey's friendly match against Russia on 31 August 2016, and subsequent World Cup 2018 qualifier against Croatia. Kaan Ayhan gave his debut for the Turkey national football team on 31 August 2016 in a friendly against Russia.

He was named in Turkey's 26-man squad for UEFA Euro 2024.

On 2 June 2026, Ayhan was selected in the 26-man squad for the 2026 FIFA World Cup. In Turkey's final group stage game against the United States, Ayhan scored the winning goal in the final minute of the game, as Turkey won 3–2; however, Turkey were eliminated due to earlier losses versus Australia and Paraguay.

== Career statistics ==
=== Club ===
As of match played 26 June 2026

Appearances and goals by club, season and competition
| Club | Season | League | | | Cup | | Continental | | Other | | Total | |
| Club | Season | Division | Apps | Goals | Apps | Goals | Apps | Goals | Apps | Goals | Apps | Goals |
|---|---|---|---|---|---|---|---|---|---|---|---|---|
| Schalke 04 | 2012–13 | Bundesliga | 0 | 0 | 0 | 0 | — | | — | | 0 | 0 |
| Schalke 04 | 2013–14 | Bundesliga | 14 | 1 | 0 | 0 | 1 (Note: Appearances in UEFA Champions League) | 0 | — | | 15 | 1 |
| Schalke 04 | 2014–15 | Bundesliga | 15 | 0 | 0 | 0 | 4 | 0 | — | | 19 | 0 |
| Schalke 04 | 2015–16 | Bundesliga | 1 | 0 | 0 | 0 | 4 (Note: Appearances in UEFA Europa League) | 0 | — | | 5 | 0 |
| Schalke 04 | Total | | 30 | 1 | 0 | 0 | 9 | 0 | — | | 39 | 1 |
| Eintracht Frankfurt (loan) | 2015–16 | Bundesliga | 2 | 0 | 0 | 0 | — | | — | | 2 | 0 |
| Fortuna Düsseldorf | 2016–17 | 2. Bundesliga | 23 | 1 | 1 | 0 | — | | — | | 24 | 1 |
| Fortuna Düsseldorf | 2017–18 | 2. Bundesliga | 31 | 1 | 1 | 0 | — | | — | | 32 | 1 |
| Fortuna Düsseldorf | 2018–19 | Bundesliga | 28 | 4 | 3 | 0 | — | | — | | 31 | 4 |
| Fortuna Düsseldorf | 2019–20 | Bundesliga | 31 | 2 | 3 | 0 | — | | — | | 34 | 2 |
| Fortuna Düsseldorf | Total | | 113 | 8 | 8 | 0 | — | | — | | 121 | 8 |
| Sassuolo | 2020–21 | Serie A | 19 | 0 | 1 | 0 | — | | — | | 20 | 0 |
| Sassuolo | 2021–22 | Serie A | 23 | 1 | 1 | 0 | — | | — | | 24 | 1 |
| Sassuolo | 2022–23 | Serie A | 10 | 0 | 1 | 1 | — | | — | | 11 | 1 |
| Sassuolo | Total | | 52 | 1 | 3 | 1 | — | | — | | 55 | 2 |
| Galatasaray (loan) | 2022–23 | Süper Lig | 5 | 0 | 1 | 1 | — | | — | | 6 | 1 |
| Galatasaray | 2023–24 | Süper Lig | 35 | 1 | 1 | 0 | 12 (Note: Ten appearances in UEFA Champions League, two appearances in UEFA Europa League) | 0 | 1 (Note: Appearance in Turkish Super Cup) | 0 | 49 | 1 |
| Galatasaray | 2024–25 | Süper Lig | 30 | 1 | 4 | 0 | 8 (Note: One appearances in UEFA Champions League, seven appearances in UEFA Europa League) | 0 | 1 (Note: Appearance in Turkish Super Cup) | 0 | 43 | 1 |
| Galatasaray | 2025–26 | Süper Lig | 19 | 1 | 4 | 0 | 4 | 0 | 2 | 0 | 29 | 0 |
| Galatasaray | Total | | 89 | 3 | 10 | 1 | 24 | 0 | 4 | 0 | 127 | 3 |
| Career total | | | 284 | 13 | 21 | 2 | 33 | 0 | 4 | 0 | 342 | 15 |

=== International ===
As of match played 25 June 2026

Appearances and goals by national team and year
| National team | Year | Apps | Goals |
|---|---|---|---|
| Turkey | 2016 | 4 | 0 |
| Turkey | 2017 | 4 | 0 |
| Turkey | 2018 | 10 | 0 |
| Turkey | 2019 | 10 | 3 |
| Turkey | 2020 | 4 | 0 |
| Turkey | 2021 | 13 | 1 |
| Turkey | 2022 | 6 | 1 |
| Turkey | 2023 | 4 | 0 |
| Turkey | 2024 | 13 | 0 |
| Turkey | 2025 | 4 | 0 |
| Turkey | 2026 | 2 | 1 |
| Total | | 74 | 6 |

Scores and results list Turkey's goal tally first, score column indicates score after each Ayhan goal.

List of international goals scored by Kaan Ayhan
| No. | Date | Venue | Cap | Opponent | Score | Result | Competition |
|---|---|---|---|---|---|---|---|
| 1 | 25 March 2019 | Eskişehir Stadium, Eskişehir, Turkey | 20 | Moldova | 4–0 | 4–0 | UEFA Euro 2020 qualifying |
| 2 | 8 June 2019 | Büyükşehir Stadium, Konya, Turkey | 22 | France | 1–0 | 2–0 | UEFA Euro 2020 qualifying |
| 3 | 14 October 2019 | Stade de France, Saint-Denis, France | 26 | France | 1–1 | 1–1 | UEFA Euro 2020 qualifying |
| 4 | 27 May 2021 | Bahçeşehir Okulları Stadium, Alanya, Turkey | 35 | Azerbaijan | 2–1 | 2–1 | Friendly |
| 5 | 14 June 2022 | Gürsel Aksel Stadium, İzmir, Turkey | 49 | Lithuania | 1–0 | 2–0 | 2022–23 UEFA Nations League C |
| 6 | 25 June 2026 | SoFi Stadium, Inglewood, United States | 74 | United States | 3–2 | 3–2 | 2026 FIFA World Cup |

== Honours ==
Fortuna Düsseldorf

- 2. Bundesliga: 2017–18

Galatasaray

- Süper Lig: 2022–23, 2023–24, 2024–25, 2025–26
- Turkish Cup: 2024–25
- Turkish Super Cup: 2023

Germany U17

- FIFA U-17 World Cup third place: 2011
