= Raphael Wolf =

German footballer

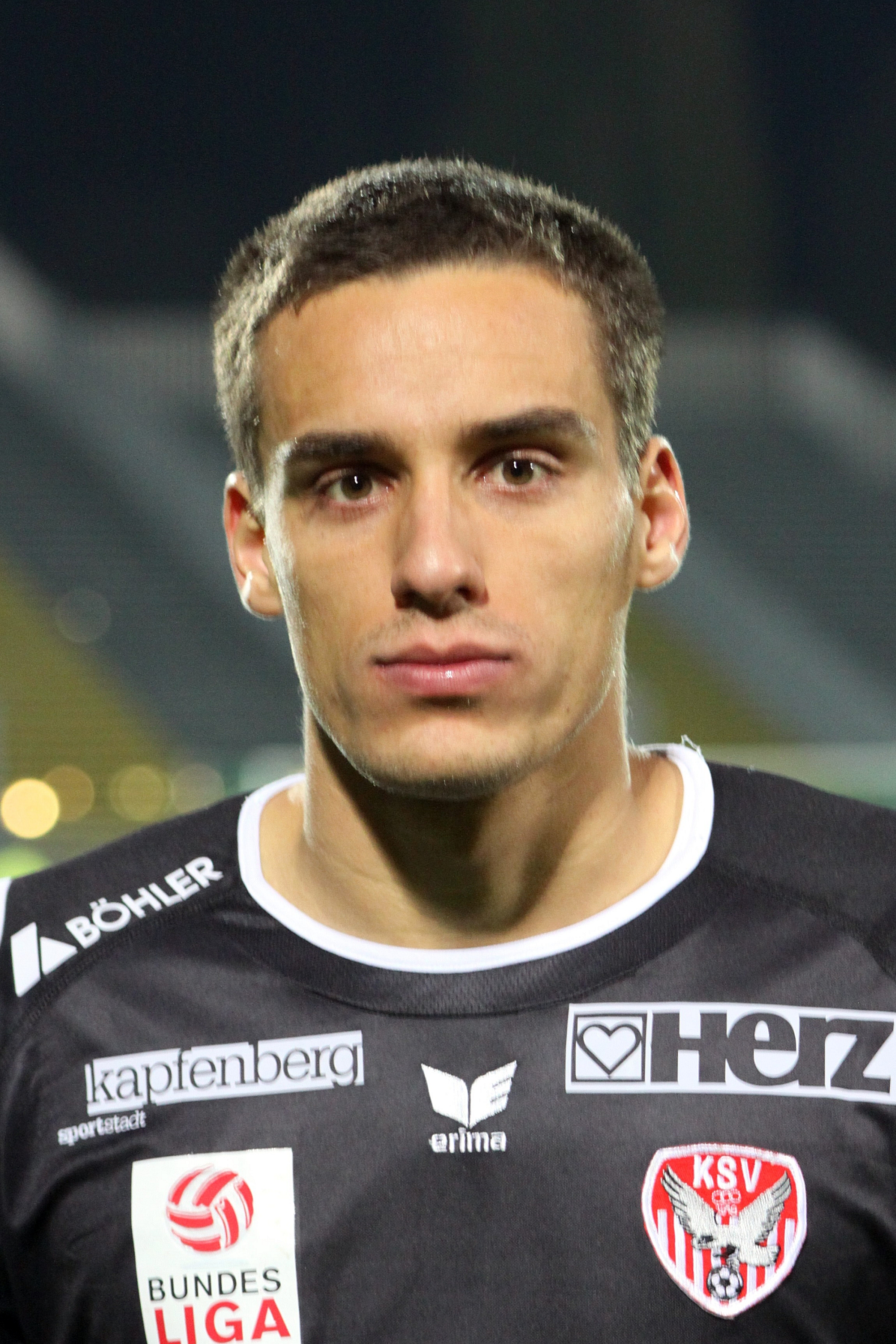
- Wolf with Kapfenberg in 2009

Personal information
- Date of birth: 6 June 1988 (age 38)
- Place of birth: Munich, West Germany
- Height: 1.90 m (6 ft 3 in)
- Position: Goalkeeper

Youth career
- FC Tegernbach
- MTV Pfaffenhofen
- –2003: FSV Pfaffenhofen
- 2003–2004: SpVgg Unterhaching
- 2005–2007: Hamburger SV

Senior career*
Years	Team	Apps	(Gls)
2007–2009	Hamburger SV	0	(0)
2007–2009	Hamburger SV II	25	(0)
2009–2012	Kapfenberger SV	104	(0)
2012–2017	Werder Bremen II	11	(0)
2012–2017	Werder Bremen	48	(0)
2017–2023	Fortuna Düsseldorf	40	(0)
Total		228	(0)
- * Club domestic league appearances and goals

Raphael Wolf (German pronunciation: [ˈʁa(ː)faeːl ˈvɔlf, -ɛl -]; born 6 June 1988) is a German former professional footballer who played as a goalkeeper.

== Career ==
In June 2017, Wolf agreed to a one-year contract with 2. Bundesliga club Fortuna Düsseldorf on a one-year contract while his contract with Bundesliga side Werder Bremen was set to expire at the end of the month.

Wolf announced his retirement from playing in March 2024.

== Career statistics ==
Appearances and goals by club, season and competition
Club	Season	League			Cup		Total	
Club	Season	Division	Apps	Goals	Apps	Goals	Apps	Goals
Hamburger SV II	2007–08	Regionalliga Nord	2	0	—		2	0
Hamburger SV II	2008–09	Regionalliga Nord	23	0	—		23	0
Hamburger SV II	Total		25	0	—		25	0
Kapfenberger SV	2009–10	Austrian Bundesliga	35	0	0	0	35	0
Kapfenberger SV	2010–11	Austrian Bundesliga	34	0	5	0	39	0
Kapfenberger SV	2011–12	Austrian Bundesliga	35	0	1	0	36	0
Kapfenberger SV	Total		104	0	6	0	110	0
Werder Bremen II	2012–13	Regionalliga Nord	2	0	—		2	0
Werder Bremen II	2013–14	Regionalliga Nord	7	0	—		7	0
Werder Bremen II	2015–16	3. Liga	2	0	—		2	0
Werder Bremen II	Total		11	0	—		11	0
Werder Bremen	2012–13	Bundesliga	0	0	0	0	0	0
Werder Bremen	2013–14	Bundesliga	21	0	0	0	21	0
Werder Bremen	2014–15	Bundesliga	27	0	2	0	29	0
Werder Bremen	Total		48	0	2	0	50	0
Fortuna Düsseldorf	2017–18	2. Bundesliga	31	0	1	0	32	0
Fortuna Düsseldorf	2018–19	Bundesliga	0	0	1	0	1	0
Fortuna Düsseldorf	2019–20	Bundesliga	0	0	0	0	0	0
Fortuna Düsseldorf	2020–21	2. Bundesliga	2	0	1	0	3	0
Fortuna Düsseldorf	2021–22	2. Bundesliga	7	0	0	0	7	0
Fortuna Düsseldorf	2022–23	2. Bundesliga	0	0	0	0	0	0
Fortuna Düsseldorf	Total		40	0	3	0	43	0
Career total			228	0	10	0	238	0
