= Tim Wiesner =

German association football player

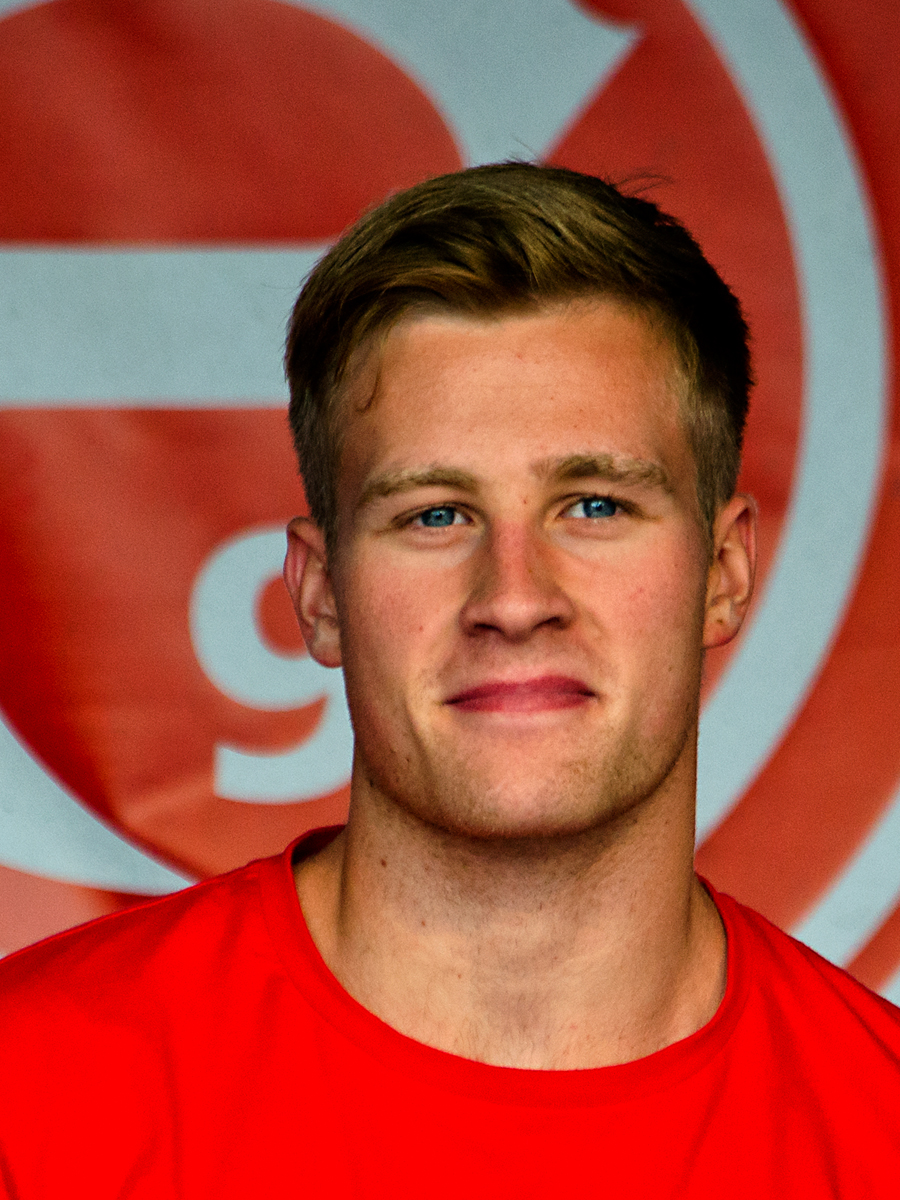
- Wiesner in 2019

Personal information
- Date of birth: 21 November 1996 (age 29)
- Place of birth: Dortmund, Germany
- Height: 1.92 m (6 ft 4 in)
- Position: Goalkeeper

Youth career
- 2001–2006: SG Herne 70
- 2006–2011: DJK TuS Hordel
- 2011–2012: Schalke 04
- 2012–2014: Rot-Weiss Essen
- 2014–2015: Fortuna Düsseldorf

Senior career*
Years	Team	Apps	(Gls)
2015–2021	Fortuna Düsseldorf II	54	(0)
2015–2021	Fortuna Düsseldorf	1	(0)
2021–2022	VfL Osnabrück	0	(0)
2022–2023	SC Verl	12	(0)
- * Club domestic league appearances and goals as of 27 May 2023

Tim Wiesner (born 21 November 1996) is a German professional footballer who plays as a goalkeeper.
