= Adam Bodzek =

German-Polish professional footballer

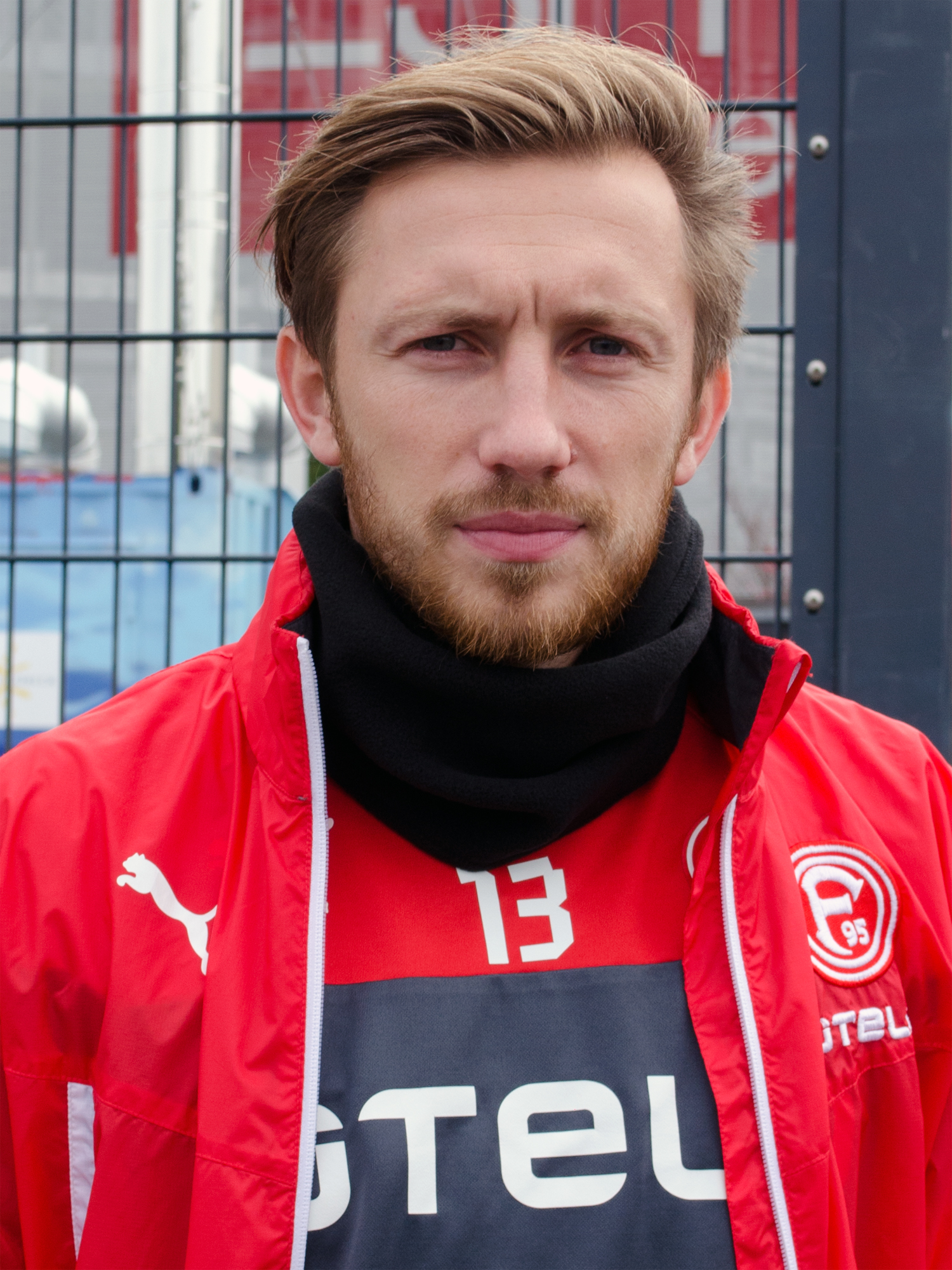
- Bodzek with Fortuna Düsseldorf in 2014

Personal information
- Full name: Adam Bodzek
- Date of birth: 7 September 1985 (age 41)
- Place of birth: Zabrze, Poland
- Height: 1.85 m (6 ft 1 in)
- Position: Defensive midfielder

Youth career
- Blau Weiß Post Recklinghausen
- –2003: SpVgg Erkenschwick

Senior career*
| Years | Team | Apps | (Gls) |
| 2003–2005 | MSV Duisburg II | 21 | (4) |
| 2005–2011 | MSV Duisburg | 97 | (4) |
| 2011–2022 | Fortuna Düsseldorf | 286 | (7) |
| 2022–2024 | Fortuna Düsseldorf II | 50 | (1) |
- * Club domestic league appearances and goals

Adam Bodzek (born 7 September 1985) is a German-Polish former professional footballer.

== Career ==
Bodzek started his career with MSV Duisburg.

== Personal life ==
Bodzek was born in Zabrze, Poland.

== Honours ==
Fortuna Düsseldorf

- 2. Bundesliga: 2017–18
