= Davor Lovren =

Croatian footballer

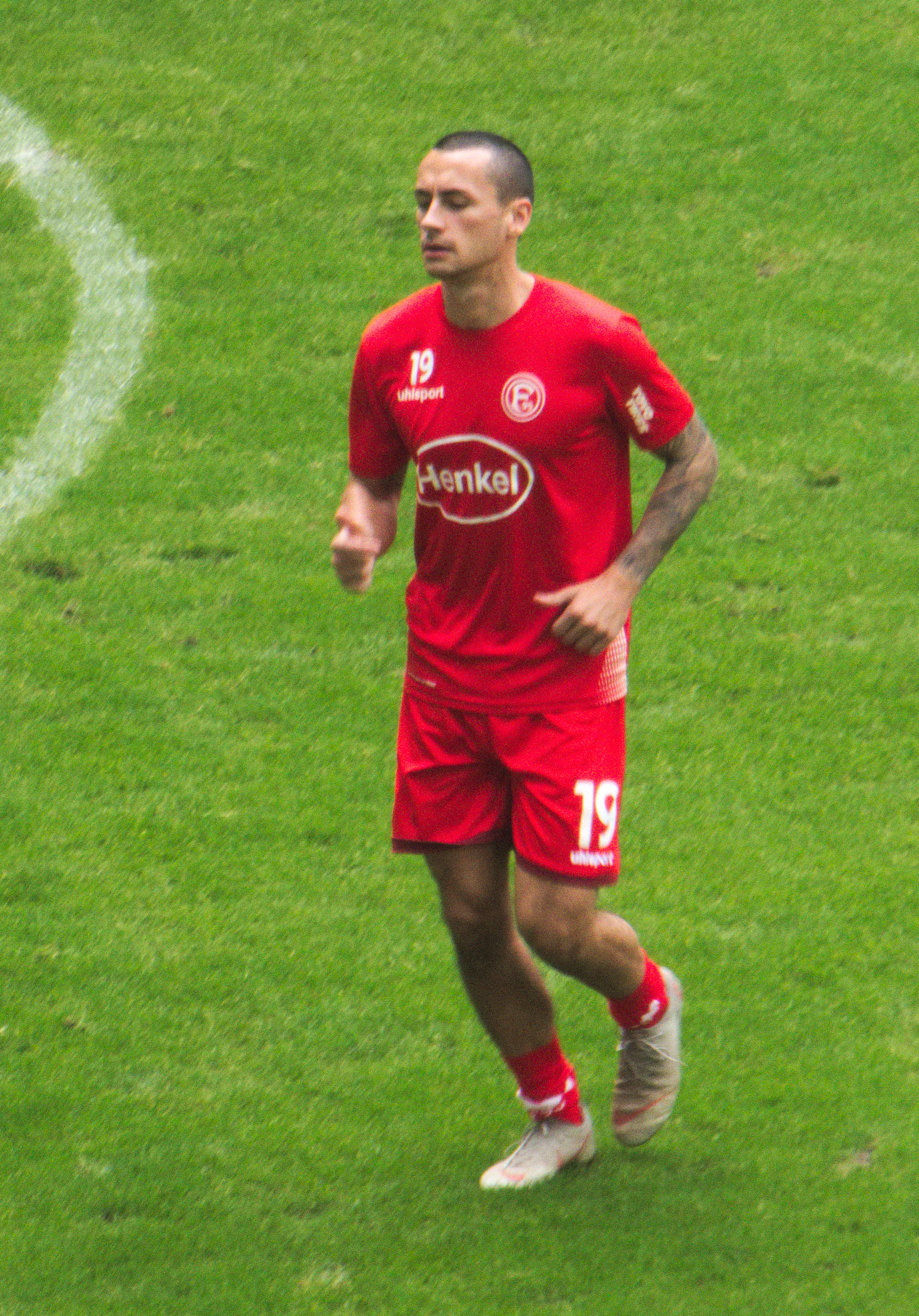
- Lovren during a match for Fortuna Düsseldorf

Personal information
- Date of birth: 3 October 1998 (age 28)
- Place of birth: Munich, Germany
- Height: 1.72 m (5 ft 8 in)
- Position: Forward

Team information
- Current team: Kustošija

Youth career
- 2006–2009: Karlovac
- 2009–2016: Dinamo Zagreb

Senior career*
Years	Team	Apps	(Gls)
2015–2018	Dinamo Zagreb II	36	(8)
2016–2018	Dinamo Zagreb	1	(0)
2017	→ Fortuna Düsseldorf (loan)	14	(1)
2018–2022	Fortuna Düsseldorf	2	(0)
2020	→ Slaven Belupo (loan)	5	(0)
2020–2022	→ Fortuna Düsseldorf II	42	(4)
2022–2023	Jarun	2	(0)
2023	Kustošija	14	(3)

International career^{‡}
2012	Croatia U14	2	(2)
2013	Croatia U15	7	(3)
2013–2014	Croatia U16	8	(1)
2013–2015	Croatia U17	21	(5)
2015	Croatia U18	6	(4)
2016–2017	Croatia U19	12	(2)
2018	Croatia U20	2	(0)
- * Club domestic league appearances and goals as of 6 June 2024 ‡ National team caps and goals as of 11:55, 18 January 2020 (UTC)

Davor Lovren (Croatian pronunciation: [dâvor lǒvren]; born 3 October 1998) is a Croatian professional footballer who is a free agent after playing for Kustošija.

== Club career ==
Lovren made his professional debut in the Croatian First Football League for GNK Dinamo Zagreb on 14 May 2016 in a game against NK Lokomotiva.

In June 2017, he joined Fortuna Düsseldorf in Germany's 2. Bundesliga on a two-year loan. However, on 11 July 2018, Düsseldorf bought Lovren permanently for €750,000.

== Personal ==
He is the younger brother of footballer Dejan Lovren. He was named after Croatian former footballer Davor Šuker.
