= Robin Bormuth =

German footballer

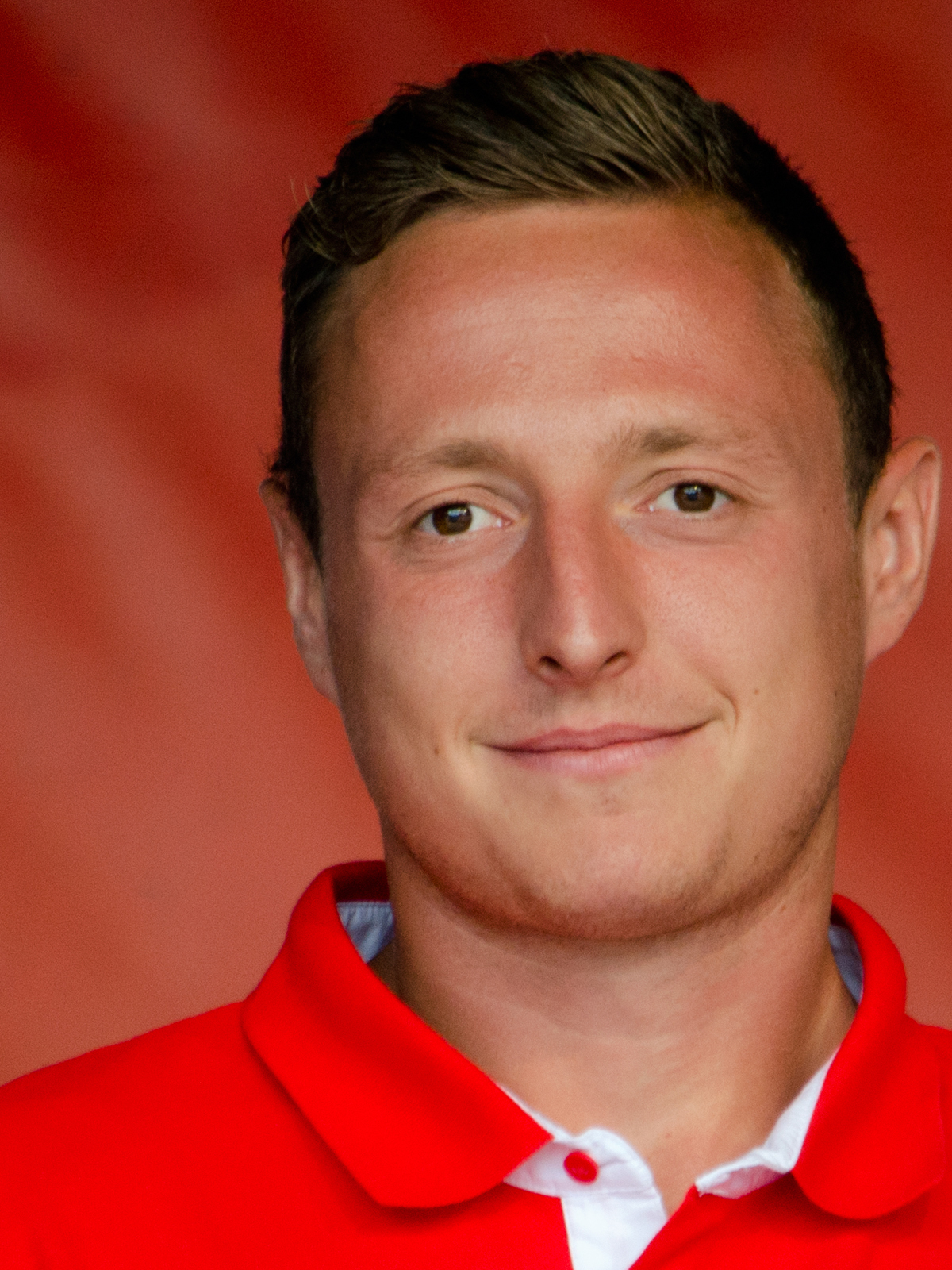
- Bormuth with Fortuna Düsseldorf in August 2019

Personal information
- Date of birth: 19 September 1995 (age 31)
- Place of birth: Groß-Rohrheim, Germany
- Height: 1.90 m (6 ft 3 in)
- Position: Centre-back

Youth career
- FC Alemannia Groß-Rohrheim
- SV Concordia Gernsheim
- Viktoria Griesheim
- –2013: Darmstadt 98
- 2013–2014: Fortuna Düsseldorf

Senior career*
| Years | Team | Apps | (Gls) |
| 2014–2020 | Fortuna Düsseldorf II | 64 | (2) |
| 2015–2020 | Fortuna Düsseldorf | 56 | (3) |
| 2020–2022 | Karlsruher SC | 35 | (4) |
| 2022–2023 | SC Paderborn | 0 | (0) |
| 2022–2023 | → Kaiserslautern (loan) | 21 | (0) |
| 2023–2025 | Karlsruher SC | 34 | (1) |
| 2025–2026 | 1. FC Saarbrücken | 27 | (0) |
- * Club domestic league appearances and goals as of 30 May 2026

Robin Bormuth (born 19 September 1995) is a German professional footballer who plays as a centre-back.

== Career ==
On 3 August 2020, after seven years with Fortuna Düsseldorf, Bormuth joined 2. Bundesliga side Karlsruher SC on a free transfer. He signed a two-year deal.

On 19 April 2022, Bormuth signed a two-year contract with SC Paderborn, effective 1 July 2022. After playing one DFB-Pokal game for Paderborn and remaining on the bench in the first five league games of the season, on 22 August 2022 he moved on loan to Kaiserslautern.

On 30 June 2025, Bormuth moved to 1. FC Saarbrücken.
