= Robert Schäfer =

German attorney and football manager

Robert Schäfer (born 23 March 1976) is a German attorney and association football manager.

== Career ==
- From 2010 to 2013 he was managing director of German football club TSV 1860 Munich
- From 2014 to 2016 he was managing director of Dynamo Dresden
- From 22 March 2016 until 15 April 2019 he was president of Fortuna Düsseldorf
