= 2022–23 Fortuna Düsseldorf season =

Fortuna Düsseldorf
2022–23 season
- Board members: Thomas Röttgermann (President); Erich Rutemöller; Lutz Pfannenstiel
- Head coach: Daniel Thioune
- Stadium: Merkur Spiel-Arena
- 2. Bundesliga: 4th
- DFB-Pokal: Round of 16
- Top goalscorer: League: Dawid Kownacki (14); All: Dawid Kownacki (16)
Home colours	Away colours	Third colours

The 2022–23 season was the 128th in the history of Fortuna Düsseldorf and their third consecutive season in the second division. The club participated in the 2. Bundesliga and the DFB-Pokal.

== Players ==
As of 11 August 2022

Note: Flags indicate national team as defined under FIFA eligibility rules; some limited exceptions apply. Players may hold more than one non-FIFA nationality.

No.	Pos.	Nation	Player
1	GK	GER	Raphael Wolf
3	DF	GER	André Hoffmann (captain)
4	MF	JPN	Ao Tanaka
5	DF	AUT	Christoph Klarer
7	FW	SWE	Kristoffer Peterson
8	DF	POL	Michał Karbownik (on loan from Brighton & Hove Albion)
9	FW	POL	Dawid Kownacki
10	FW	GER	Daniel Ginczek
11	MF	GER	Felix Klaus
14	FW	GER	Kwadwo Baah (on loan from Watford)
15	DF	GER	Tim Oberdorf
19	FW	GER	Emmanuel Iyoha
21	GK	GER	Dennis Gorka

No.	Pos.	Nation	Player
22	DF	AUT	Benjamin Böckle
23	MF	GER	Shinta Appelkamp
25	DF	GER	Matthias Zimmermann
27	FW	GHA	Opoku Ampomah
28	FW	GER	Rouwen Hennings
29	MF	NED	Jorrit Hendrix
30	DF	NED	Jordy de Wijs
31	MF	GER	Marcel Sobottka
33	GK	GER	Florian Kastenmeier
34	DF	FRA	Nicolas Gavory
41	DF	JPN	Takashi Uchino
42	MF	GER	Tom Geerkens
46	MF	GER	Elione Fernandes Neto

=== Out on loan ===
Note: Flags indicate national team as defined under FIFA eligibility rules; some limited exceptions apply. Players may hold more than one non-FIFA nationality.

No. / Pos. / Nation / Player; — / DF / GER / Jamil Siebert (on loan to Viktoria Köln until 30 June 2023)	No. / Pos. / Nation / Player; — / FW / GER / Nicklas Shipnoski (on loan to Jahn Regensburg until 30 June 2023)

== Pre-season and friendlies ==
Win Draw Loss

18 June 2022 Friendly	VfB 03 Hilden (Germany)	0–5	(Germany) Fortuna Düsseldorf	Hilden
16:00 CEST (UTC+2)				Stadium: Bezirkssportanlage Am Bandsbusch

22 June 2022 Friendly	Fortuna Düsseldorf (Germany)	3–1	(Slovakia) Ružomberok	Freistadt
18:00 CEST (UTC+2)				Stadium: Holzhaider-Stadion

25 June 2022 Friendly	Fortuna Düsseldorf (Germany)	1–2	(Greece) Olympiacos	Wels
18:00 CEST (UTC+2)				Stadium: HUBER Arena

2 July 2022 Friendly	TuS Koblenz (Germany)	0–1	(Germany) Fortuna Düsseldorf	Koblenz
14:00 CEST (UTC+2)				Stadium: Stadion Oberwerth

8 July 2022 Friendly	Fortuna Düsseldorf (Germany)	1–5	(Netherlands) Twente	Düsseldorf
14:00 CEST (UTC+2)	Hennings 8'		Černý 32'; Rots 73', 90+'; Staring 79'; Vlap 90+' (pen.)	Stadium: Paul-Janes-Stadion

22 September 2022 Friendly	VfL Bochum (Germany)	Cancelled	(Germany) Fortuna Düsseldorf	Bochum
14:00 CEST (UTC+2)
Note: The game was cancelled due to a shortage of players at Fortuna Düsseldorf.

29 November 2022 Friendly	Fortuna Düsseldorf (Germany)	3–0	(Netherlands) De Graafschap	Düsseldorf
14:00 CET (UTC+1)	Hennings 14'; De Wijs 67'; Affo 81'	Report		Stadium: Paul-Janes-Stadion; Attendance: 170

6 January 2023 Friendly	Fortuna Düsseldorf (Germany)	4–3	(Germany) SV Meppen	Düsseldorf
14:00 CET (UTC+1)				Stadium: Paul-Janes-Stadion

14 January 2023 Friendly	Fortuna Düsseldorf (Germany)	1–0	(Switzerland) Grasshopper Club Zürich	La Línea de la Concepción, Spain
14:30 CET (UTC+2)	Karbownik 81'			Stadium: Estadio Municipal

== Competitions ==
=== Overall record ===
Competition	First match	Last match	Starting round	Final position	Record							
Competition	First match	Last match	Starting round	Final position	Pld	W	D	L	GF	GA	GD	Win %
2. Bundesliga	16 July 2022	28 May 2023	Matchday 1	4th	34	17	7	10	60	43	+17	50.00
DFB-Pokal	30 July 2022	8 February 2023	First round	Round of 16	3	2	1	0	8	2	+6	66.67
Total					37	19	8	10	68	45	+23	51.35

Source: Soccerway

=== 2. Bundesliga ===
==== League table ====
Pos	Team	Pld	W	D	L	GF	GA	GD	Pts	Promotion, qualification or relegation
2	Darmstadt 98 (P)	34	20	7	7	50	33	+17	67	Promotion to Bundesliga
3	Hamburger SV	34	20	6	8	70	45	+25	66	Qualification for promotion play-offs
4	Fortuna Düsseldorf	34	17	7	10	60	43	+17	58	
5	FC St. Pauli	34	16	10	8	55	39	+16	58	
6	SC Paderborn	34	16	7	11	68	44	+24	55	

Source: DFB
Rules for classification: 1) Points; 2) Goal difference; 3) Goals scored; 4) Head-to-head results; 5) Head-to-head away goals scored; 6) Away goals scored; 7) Play-off.
(P) Promoted

==== Results summary ====
Overall								Home						Away					
Pld	W	D	L	GF	GA	GD	Pts	W	D	L	GF	GA	GD	W	D	L	GF	GA	GD
34	17	7	10	60	43	+17	58	11	4	2	38	19	+19	6	3	8	22	24	−2

Last updated: 28 May 2023.
Source: DFB

==== Results by round ====
Round	1	2	3	4	5	6	7	8	9	10	11	12	13	14	15	16	17	18	19	20	21	22	23	24	25	26	27	28	29	30	31	32	33	34
Ground	A	H	A	H	A	H	A	H	A	H	A	H	A	A	H	A	H	H	A	H	A	H	A	H	A	H	A	H	A	H	H	A	H	A
Result	W	W	L	D	D	W	L	W	L	W	L	L	W	W	W	L	L	W	L	W	L	W	W	D	W	D	D	W	L	W	W	D	D	W
Position	5	3	6	9	7	5	8	5	6	4	5	7	6	6	5	6	7	6	6	6	6	6	5	5	4	6	5	4	6	6	5	5	5	4

Updated to match(es) played on 28 May 2023. Source: DFB
A = Away; H = Home; W = Win; D = Draw; L = Loss

==== Matches ====
The league fixtures were announced on 17 June 2022.

16 July 2022 1	1. FC Magdeburg	1–2	Fortuna Düsseldorf	Magdeburg
13:00 CEST (UTC+2)	Krempicki 50'		Hennings 43' (pen.); Klaus 46'	Stadium: MDCC-Arena; Referee: Arne Aarnink

22 July 2022 2	Fortuna Düsseldorf	2–1	SC Paderborn	Düsseldorf
18:30 CEST (UTC+2)	Kownacki 2'; Hennings 30'		Platte 21'	Stadium: Merkur Spiel-Arena; Referee: Tobias Welz

5 August 2022 3	SV Sandhausen	1–0	Fortuna Düsseldorf	Sandhausen
18:30 CEST (UTC+2)	Bachmann 46'	Report		Stadium: BWT-Stadion am Hardtwald; Referee: Sven Waschitzki-Günther

14 August 2022 4	Fortuna Düsseldorf	2–2	Greuther Fürth	Düsseldorf
13:30 CEST (UTC+2)	Gavory (yellow card) 10'; Hennings (yellow card) 36'; de Wijs (yellow card) 49'; Hoffmann 62'; Kownacki 72'	Report	Hrgota 43' 78' (pen.); Ache (yellow card) 45+1'; Itter (yellow card) 90+2'; Mhamdi (yellow card) 90+4'; Abiama (yellow card) 90+6'	Stadium: Merkur Spiel-Arena; Attendance: 23,861; Referee: (Germany) Tobias Reichel

20 August 2022 5	Eintracht Braunschweig	2–2	Fortuna Düsseldorf	Braunschweig
20:30 CEST (UTC+2)	Strompf (yellow card) 8'; Krauße 56'; Donkor 69'	Report	de Wijs (yellow card) 33'; Kownacki (yellow card) 37'; Gavory 61'; Sobottka 71' (yellow card) 74'; Oberdorf (yellow card) 84'; Ginczek (yellow card) 89'	Stadium: Eintracht-Stadion; Attendance: 17,471; Referee: (Germany) Bastian Dankert

26 August 2022 6	Fortuna Düsseldorf	4–0	Jahn Regensburg	Düsseldorf
18:30 CEST (UTC+2)	Hoffmann (yellow card) 1'; Ginczek 59'; Kownacki 65' (pen.); Appelkamp (yellow card) 74' (goal) 85'; Klaus 78'	Report	Guwara (yellow card) 64'; Gimber (yellow card) 69'; Elvedi (yellow card) 89'	Stadium: Merkur Spiel-Arena; Attendance: 20,745; Referee: (Germany) Florian Heft

2 September 2022 7	1. FC Heidenheim	2–1	Fortuna Düsseldorf	Heidenheim an der Brenz
18:30 CEST (UTC+2)	Beck 22'; Beste (yellow card) 28'; Kleindienst 87'	Report	Gavory (yellow card) 34'; Kownacki 59'; Hoffmann (yellow card) 63'; Zimmermann (yellow card) 78'; Klarer (yellow card) 90+6'	Stadium: Voith-Arena; Attendance: 9,468; Referee: (Germany) Robert Kampka

10 September 2022 8	Fortuna Düsseldorf	3–1	Hansa Rostock	Düsseldorf
20:30 CEST (UTC+2)	Kownacki 10'; Sobottka 27'; Karbownik (yellow card) 32'; Peterson (yellow card) 73'; Iyoha 77'	Report	Fröde 61'	Stadium: Merkur Spiel-Arena; Attendance: 26,719; Referee: (Germany) Sascha Stegemann

17 September 2022 9	Hamburg	2–0	Fortuna Düsseldorf	Hamburg
20:30 CEST (UTC+2)	Glatzel 21'; Reis (yellow card) 36'; Heyer (yellow card) 79'; Jatta 90'	Report	Hendrix (yellow card) 45'; Karbownik (yellow card) 48'; Kownacki (yellow card) 74'	Stadium: Volksparkstadion; Attendance: 49,616; Referee: (Germany) Sven Jablonski

1 October 2022 10	Fortuna Düsseldorf	4–1	Arminia Bielefeld	Düsseldorf
13:00 CEST (UTC+2)	Appelkamp 21' 66'; Tanaka 47'; Oberdorf 76'; Peterson (yellow card) 82'	Report	Lepinjica (yellow card) 24'; Hack 34' (pen.); Andrade (yellow card) 55'	Stadium: Merkur Spiel-Arena; Attendance: 25,841; Referee: (Germany) Bastian Dankert

8 October 2022 11	Darmstadt	1–0	Fortuna Düsseldorf	Darmstadt
13:00 CEST (UTC+2)	Manu (yellow card) 29'; Müller (yellow card) 44'; Pfeiffer 72' (yellow card) 90+4'; Mehlem (yellow card) 78'; Holland (yellow card) 88'; Karic (yellow card) 90'	Report	Iyoha (yellow card) 64'; Sobottka (yellow card) 79'; Marcel Mansfield (yellow card) 90+4'; Klarer (yellow card) 90+4'	Stadium: Merck-Stadion am Böllenfalltor; Attendance: 15,850; Referee: (Germany) Max Burda

15 October 2022 12	Fortuna Düsseldorf	0–1	1. FC Nürnberg	Düsseldorf
13:00 CEST (UTC+2)	Klaus (yellow card) 73'; Karbownik (yellow card) 86'	Report	Geis (yellow card) 14'; Nürnberger (yellow card) 34'; Schindler (yellow card) 35'; Valentini (yellow card) 36'; Duah 47'; Daferner (yellow card) 55'; Schleimer (yellow card) 82'; Mathenia (yellow card) 90+3'	Stadium: Merkur Spiel-Arena; Attendance: 25,750; Referee: (Germany) Wolfgang Haslberger

23 October 2022 13	Karlsruher SC	0–2	Fortuna Düsseldorf	Karlsruhe
13:30 CEST (UTC+2)	Jung (yellow card) 54'	Report	Pterson 8' 22'	Stadium: BBBank Wildpark; Attendance: 15,500; Referee: (Germany) Florian Heft

29 October 2022 14	Holstein Kiel	1–2	Fortuna Düsseldorf	Kiel
13:00 CEST (UTC+2)	Erras (yellow card) 25'; Obuz (yellow card) 50'; Skrzybski 70'	Report	Appelkamp 42'; Sobottka (yellow card) 53' (yellow-red card) 90+3'; Kownacki 82' (pen.); Klaus (yellow card) 89'	Stadium: Holstein-Stadion; Attendance: 10,000; Referee: (Germany) Robert Schröder

5 November 2022 15	Fortuna Düsseldorf	1–0	St. Pauli	Düsseldorf
13:00 CET (UTC+1)	Hennings 22' (yellow card) 66'; Klarer (yellow card) 58'	Report	Fazliji (red card) 58'; Metcalfe (yellow card) 75'	Stadium: Merkur Spiel-Arena; Attendance: 34,000; Referee: (Germany) Frank Willenborg

8 November 2022 16	Hannover 96	2–0	Fortuna Düsseldorf	Hanover
18:30 CET (UTC+1)	Nielsen 34'; Teuchert 43'; Köhn (yellow card) 82'	Report	Oberdorf (yellow card) 23'; Kownacki (yellow card) 27'; Hendrix (yellow card) 49'; Karbownik (yellow card) 65'	Stadium: Heinz-von-Heiden-Arena; Attendance: 24,100; Referee: (Germany) Florian Exner

11 November 2022 17	Fortuna Düsseldorf	1–2	1. FC Kaiserslautern	Düsseldorf
18:30 CET (UTC+1)	Karbownik 14'; Hendrix (yellow card) 22'; Oberdorf (yellow card) 75'	Report	Kraus 50'; Zimmer (yellow card) 90+3'; Klement 90+6' (pen.)	Stadium: Merkur Spiel-Arena; Attendance: 44,422; Referee: (Germany) Benjamin Cortus

27 January 2023 18	Fortuna Düsseldorf	3–2	1. FC Magdeburg	Düsseldorf
18:30 CET (UTC+1)	Kownacki 9' 34' (yellow card) 90'; Klarer (yellow card) 36'; Sobottka (yellow card) 54'; Appelkamp 84'; Hennings (yellow card) 89'	Report	Piccini (yellow card) 5'; Kwarteng 6' 59'; Daniel Heber (yellow card) 29'; Rieckmann (yellow card) 32'; Atik (yellow card) 85'	Stadium: Merkur Spiel-Arena; Attendance: 29,433; Referee: (Germany) Frank Willenborg

3 February 2023 19	Paderborn	4–1	Fortuna Düsseldorf	Paderborn
18:30 CET (UTC+1)	Pieringer 37'; Heuer 62'; Muslija 68' (pen.); Leipertz 81'	Report	Peterson (yellow card) 11'; Hennings 59' (pen.)	Stadium: Home Deluxe Arena; Attendance: 12,179; Referee: (Germany) Tobias Reichel

12 February 2023 20	Fortuna Düsseldorf	2–0	Sandhausen	Düsseldorf
13:30 CET (UTC+1)	Oberdorf 85'; Hennings 88'	Report	Bachmann (yellow card) 32'; Kinsombi (yellow card) 68'; Mehlem (yellow card) 80'; Çalhanoğlu (yellow card) 87'	Stadium: Merkur Spiel-Arena; Attendance: 22,125; Referee: (Germany) Tobias Welz

18 February 2023 21	Greuther Fürth	2–1	Fortuna Düsseldorf	Fürth
13:00 CET (UTC+1)	Ache 28' 57'; Christiansen (yellow card) 84'	Report	Klaus (yellow card) 29'; Pterson 67'; Tanaka (yellow card) 84'; Hendrix (yellow card) 88'; de Wijs (yellow card) 90+4' (yellow-red card) 90+4'	Stadium: Sportpark Ronhof Thomas Sommer; Attendance: 9,804; Referee: (Germany) Marco Fritz

24 February 2023 22	Fortuna Düsseldorf	3–1	Eintracht Braunschweig	Düsseldorf
18:30 CET (UTC+1)	Kownacki 1'; Klarer 25'; Zimmermann (yellow card) 32'; Ginczek (yellow card) 81'; Jona Niemiec 85'; Hoffmann (yellow card) 90+8'	Report	Gechter (yellow card) 24'; Kaufmann (yellow card) 53'; Kastenmeier 62' (o.g.); Kijewski (yellow card) 70'; de Medina (yellow card) 90+2'	Stadium: Merkur Spiel-Arena; Attendance: 24,127; Referee: (Germany) Sven Waschitzki

4 March 2023 23	Jahn Regensburg	0–1	Fortuna Düsseldorf	Regensburg
13:00 CET (UTC+1)	Yıldırım (yellow card) 45+2'; Caliskaner (yellow card) 74'	Report	Sobottka (yellow card) 55'; Kownacki 86' (pen.)	Stadium: Jahnstadion Regensburg; Attendance: 10,119; Referee: (Germany) Robert Kampka

11 March 2023 24	Fortuna Düsseldorf	1–1	1. FC Heidenheim	Düsseldorf
20:30 CET (UTC+1)	Iyoha 27'; Kownacki (yellow card) 58'; Sobottka (yellow card) 60'; Klaus (yellow card) 90+3'	Report	Kleindienst 20'; Pick (yellow card) 53'; Thomalla (red card) 77'; Theuerkauf (yellow card) 90+3'	Stadium: Merkur Spiel-Arena; Attendance: 26,827; Referee: (Germany) Daniel Schlager

19 March 2023 25	Hansa Rostock	2–5	Fortuna Düsseldorf	Rostock
13:30 CET (UTC+1)	Pröger 56'; Schumacher 78'; Meißner (yellow card) 84'	Report	Kownacki 12'; Hennings 20'; Zimmermann 41' 48'; Klarer (yellow card) 78' (goal) 82'; Hendrix (yellow card) 79'	Stadium: Ostseestadion; Attendance: 25,000; Referee: (Germany) Patrick Alt

31 March 2023 26	Fortuna Düsseldorf	2–2	Hamburger SV	Düsseldorf
18:30 CET (UTC+1)	de Wijs (yellow card) 4'; Kownacki 21' (yellow card) 76'; Klaus 28'; Hennings (yellow card) 47'; Tanaka (yellow card) 63'	Report	Bénes 5'; Muheim (yellow card) 54'; Meffert (yellow card) 57'; Klarer 75' (o.g.); Javi Montero (yellow card) 78' (yellow-red card) 89'	Stadium: Merkur Spiel-Arena; Attendance: 51,200; Referee: (Germany) Robert Schröder

9 April 2023 27	Arminia Bielefeld	2–2	Fortuna Düsseldorf	Bielefeld
13:30 CET (UTC+1)	Andrade (yellow card) 16'; Klos 19'; Guilherme Ramos (yellow card) 23'; Vasiliadis (yellow card) 75'; Lasme 84'	Report	Iyoha 48'; Klaus 60'; Kownacki (yellow card) 90+3'	Stadium: SchücoArena; Attendance: 23,433; Referee: (Germany) Florian Heft

16 April 2023 28	Fortuna Düsseldorf	1–0	Darmstadt	Düsseldorf
13:30 CET (UTC+1)	Iyoha (yellow card) 23' (goal) 51'	Report	Riedel (yellow card) 79'; Tietz (yellow card) 87'; Seydel (yellow card) 90+4'	Stadium: Merkur Spiel-Arena; Attendance: 30,179; Referee: (Germany) Deniz Aytekin

22 April 2023 29	1. FC Nürnberg	2–0	Fortuna Düsseldorf	Nürnberg
13:00 CET (UTC+1)	Nathaniel Brown 10'; Vindahl (yellow card) 25'; Duah 90+3'	Report	Klaus (yellow card) 79'; Karbownik (yellow card) 79'	Stadium: Max-Morlock-Stadion; Attendance: 27,682; Referee: (Germany) Sören Storks

30 April 2023 30	Fortuna Düsseldorf	3–2	Karlsruher SC	Düsseldorf
13:30 CET (UTC+1)	Peterson 33'; de Wijs (yellow card) 64' (goal) 90+3'; Zimmermann 72'	Report	Franke (yellow card) 17'; Kaufmann 28'; Heise 66'	Stadium: Merkur Spiel-Arena; Attendance: 25,408; Referee: (Germany) Timo Gerach

6 May 2023 31	Fortuna Düsseldorf	3–0	Holstein Kiel	Düsseldorf
13:00 CET (UTC+1)	Appelkamp 14'; Hoffmann 19'; Ginczek 24' (pen.)	Report	Wahl (yellow card) 63'	Stadium: Merkur Spiel-Arena; Attendance: 28,935; Referee: (Germany) Aarne Aarnink

13 May 2023 32	FC St. Pauli	0–0	Fortuna Düsseldorf	Hamburg
20:30 CET (UTC+1)	Mets (yellow card) 39'	Report	Hoffmann (yellow card) 53'; Ginczek (yellow card) 60'; Zimmermann (yellow card) 76'; Klarer (yellow card) 81'	Stadium: Millerntor-Stadion; Attendance: 29,546; Referee: (Germany) Matthias Jöllenbeck

21 May 2023 33	Fortuna Düsseldorf	3–3	Hannover 96	Düsseldorf
13:30 CET (UTC+1)	Klaus 30' 52' (yellow card) 67'; Ginczek 77'; Klarer (yellow card) 83'; Hoffmann (yellow card) 90+1'	Report	Teuchert 12'; Schaub 21'; Nielsen (yellow card) 36'; Besuschkow (yellow card) 54'; Beier 89'	Stadium: Merkur Spiel-Arena; Attendance: 35,512; Referee: (Germany) Michael Bacher

28 May 2023 34	1. FC Kaiserslautern	0–3	Fortuna Düsseldorf	Kaiserslautern
15:30 CET (UTC+1)	Zimmer (red card) 25'; Bod (yellow card) 65'	Report	Kownacki 17' 76' (yellow card) 43'; Oberdorf (yellow card) 32'; Zimmermann (yellow card) 45+1'; Ginczek 89'	Stadium: Fritz-Walter-Stadion; Attendance: 47,956; Referee: (Germany) Martin Petersen

=== DFB-Pokal ===
30 July 2022 First round	Kickers Offenbach	1–4	Fortuna Düsseldorf	Offenbach
18:01 CEST (UTC+2)	Lemmer 57'	Report	Hoffmann 33'; Lemmer 54' (o.g.); Ginczek 71', 79'	Stadium: Bieberer Berg; Attendance: 16,620; Referee: Benjamin Cortus

19 October 2022 Second round	Jahn Regensburg	0–3	Fortuna Düsseldorf	Regensburg
20:45 CEST (UTC+2)	Elvedi (yellow card) 56'	Report	Peterson 5'; Kownacki 16'; Iyoha 45+1'	Stadium: Jahnstadion Regensburg; Attendance: 7,892; Referee: (Germany) Timo Gerach

8 February 2023 Round of 16	1. FC Nürnberg	1–1 (5–3 p)	Fortuna Düsseldorf	Nürnberg
18:00 CEST (UTC+2)	Gyamerah (yellow card) 59'; Duman 90+3'; Flick (yellow card) 94' (red card) 120+1'	Report	Kownacki 33'; Hoffmann (yellow card) 123'	Stadium: Max-Morlock-Stadion; Attendance: 25,216; Referee: (Germany) Matthias Jöllenbeck
