= 2021–22 Fortuna Düsseldorf season =

Fortuna Düsseldorf
2021–22 season
- Manager: Christian Preußer (until 8 February); Daniel Thioune (from 8 February)
- Stadium: Merkur Spiel-Arena
- 2. Bundesliga: 10th
- DFB-Pokal: Second round

The 2021–22 season is Fortuna Düsseldorf's 127th season in existence and the club's second season back in the 2. Bundesliga, the second tier of German football, following their relegation from the Bundesliga in the 2019–20 season. The club also participated in the DFB-Pokal.

== Background and pre-season ==
Fortuna Düsseldorf finished the 2020–21 season in 5th place, 8 points below the automatic promotion places and 6 points below the promotion play-off place. Manager Uwe Rösler's contract was not renewed at the end of the previous season. Christian Preußer was appointed as manager in May 2021.

== Season summary ==
Preußer was sacked as manager on 8 February 2022, and replaced by Daniel Thioune. Düsseldorf finished the season in 10th.

=== Pre-season ===
Pre-season match details
Date	Time	Opponent	Venue	Result F–A	Scorers	Attendance	Ref.
23 June 2021	18:30	TSV Meerbusch	Away	11–0	Peterson 1', Shipnoski 17', 39', Bunk 22', 46', Piotrowski 28', Prib 38', Sobottka 61', Klaus 65', Lobinger 66', Ofori 72'		
26 June 2021	14:00	SC Schiefbahn	Away	9–0	Klaus 10', 31', Ofori 21', 83', Shipnoski 57', Basczyk 64' o.g., Lobinger 68', 72', Bunk 88'	250	
4 July 2021	17:00	Würzburger Kickers	Home	1–2 (Note: Match played over 120 minutes)	Hartherz 115' pen.		
8 July 2021	18:00	AEL Limassol	Home	2–2	Sobottka 2', Narey 13'	200	
17 July 2021	15:30	OH Leuven	Home	3–0	Patris 16' o.g., Hennings 45'pen., Zimmermann 52'	3,095	

== Competitions ==
=== 2. Bundesliga ===
==== League table ====
Pos	Team	Pld	W	D	L	GF	GA	GD	Pts
8	1. FC Nürnberg	34	14	9	11	49	49	0	51
9	Holstein Kiel	34	12	9	13	46	54	−8	45
10	Fortuna Düsseldorf	34	11	11	12	45	42	+3	44
11	Hannover 96	34	11	9	14	35	49	−14	42
12	Karlsruher SC	34	9	14	11	54	55	−1	41

Source: DFB
Rules for classification: 1) Points; 2) Goal difference; 3) Goals scored; 4) Head-to-head points; 5) Head-to-head goal difference; 6) Head-to-head away goals scored; 7) Away goals scored; 8) Play-off.

==== Matches ====
2. Bundesliga match details
Match	Date	Time	Opponent	Venue	Result F–A	Scorers	Attendance	League position	Ref.
1	25 July 2021	13:30	SV Sandhausen	Away	2–0	Hennings 56', 62' pen.	3,452	5th	
2	31 July 2021	20:30	Werder Bremen	Home	2–3	Hennings 47', Narey 90+4'	12,850	8th	
3	14 August 2021	13:30	1. FC Nürnberg	Away	0–2		12,361	14th	
4	20 August 2021	18:30	Holstein Kiel	Home	2–2	Narey 40', Peterson 87'	16,349	11th	
5	28 August 2021	20:30	Schalke 04	Away	1–3	Appelkamp 12'	25,000	12th	
6	12 September 2021	13:30	Erzgebirge Aue	Away	1–0	Hennings 29' pen.	6,064	12th	
7	18 September 2021	13:30	Jahn Regensburg	Home	1–1	Boženík 33'	19,256	13th	
8	25 September 2021	13:30	FC Ingolstadt	Away	2–1	Hoffmann 57', Zimmermann 74'	4,579	10th	
9	2 October 2021	13:30	SC Paderborn	Home	2–3	Hennings 34', 59' pen.	19,727	12th	
10	16 October 2021	20:30	Hamburger SV	Away	1–1	Boženík 71'	38,954	12th	
11	23 October 2021	13:30	Karlsruher SC	Home	3–1	Heise 9' o.g., Klarer 51', Narey 62'	22,458	9th	
12	31 October 2021	13:30	Hansa Rostock	Away	1–2	Narey 57'	21,000	11th	
13	6 November 2021	13:30	Hannover 96	Home	1–1	Klarer 6'	22,398	12th	
14	21 November 2021	13:30	Dynamo Dresden	Away	0–1		8,912	12th	
15	26 November 2021	18:30	1. FC Heidenheim	Home	0–1		13,873	13th	
16	3 December 2021	18:30	Darmstadt 98	Away	3–1	Hennings 16', 41', Narey 76'	12,450	11th	
17	11 December 2021	20:30	FC St. Pauli	Home	1–1	Hennings 68'	15,000	12th	
18	17 December 2021	18:30	SV Sandhausen	Home	0–1		10,500	13th	
19	15 January 2022	13:30	Werder Bremen	Away	0–3		0	14th	
20	21 January 2022	18:30	1. FC Nürnberg	Home	0–1		750	15th	
21	6 February 2022	13:30	Holstein Kiel	Away	0–1		0	16th	
22	13 February 2022	13:30	Schalke 04	Home	2–1	Narey 47', Hennings 56'	10,000	16th	
23	20 February 2022	13:30	Erzgebirge Aue	Home	3–1	Hennings 5', 90', Ginczek 51' pen.	10,000	13th	
24	27 February 2022	13:30	Jahn Regensburg	Away	0–0		6,319	13th	
25	6 March 2022	13:30	FC Ingolstadt	Home	3–0	Ginczek 4', Zimmermann 35', Narey 50'	14,200	13th	
26	12 March 2022	13:30	SC Paderborn	Away	1–1	Hartherz 43'	5,253	11th	
27	19 March 2022	13:30	Hamburger SV	Home	1–1	Bodzek 85'	31,353	13th	
28	3 April 2022	13:30	Karlsruher SC	Away	2–2	Ginczek 31', Hennings 38'	17,907	13th	
29	8 April 2022	18:30	Hansa Rostock	Home	3–0	Tanaka 13', Appelkamp 64', Narey 90'	22,346	13th	
30	16 April 2022	13:30	Hannover 96	Away	0–0		17,200	13th	
31	22 April 2022	18:30	Dynamo Dresden	Home	2–2	Appelkamp 26', de Wijs 31'	25,264	13th	
32	29 April 2022	18:30	1. FC Heidenheim	Away	3–1	Piotrowski 20', Klaus 32', Klarer 56'	7,778	10th	
33	6 May 2022	18:30	Darmstadt 98	Home	2–1	Iyoha 3', Zimmermann 10'	31,622	10th	
34	15 May 2022	15:30	FC St. Pauli	Away	0–2		29,546	10th	

=== DFB-Pokal ===
DFB-Pokal match details
Round	Date	Time	Opponent	Venue	Result F–A	Scorers	Attendance	Ref.
First round	8 August 2021	15:30	VfL Oldenburg	Away	5–0	Hennings 13', 62' pen., Abbes 23' o.g., Kownacki 26' pen., Shipnoski 69'	4,200	
Second round	27 October 2021	20:45	Hannover 96	Away	0–2		11,300	

== Transfers ==
=== Transfers in ===
Date	Position	Name	From	Fee	Ref.
30 June 2021	DF	Khaled Narey	Hamburger SV	Free transfer	
1 July 2021	MF	Nicklas Shipnoski	1. FC Saarbrücken	Undisclosed	
1 July 2021	MF	Felix Klaus	VfL Wolfsburg	Undisclosed	

=== Loans in ===
Date	Position	Name	Club	Return	Ref.
26 June 2021	MF	Ao Tanaka	Kawasaki Frontale	End of season	
12 July 2021	DF	Dragoș Nedelcu	FCSB	4 February 2022	

=== Transfers out ===
Date	Position	Name	To	Fee	Ref.
22 June 2021	MF	Jean Zimmer	1. FC Kaiserslautern	Undisclosed	
1 July 2021	MF	Gökhan Gül		Released	
1 July 2021	FW	Kenan Karaman		Released	
1 July 2021	GK	Anton Mitryushkin		Released	

=== Loans out ===
Date	Position	Name	Club	Return	Ref.
