= Kastenmeier =

Kastenmeier is a surname. Notable people with the surname include:

- Florian Kastenmeier (born 1997), German footballer
- Robert Kastenmeier (1924–2015), American politician
