= 2020–21 Fortuna Düsseldorf season =

Fortuna Düsseldorf
2020–21 season
- Board Members: Thomas Röttgermann (President); Erich Rutemöller; Lutz Pfannenstiel
- Head coach: Uwe Rösler
- Stadium: Merkur Spiel-Arena
- 2. Bundesliga: 5th
- DFB-Pokal: Second round
Home colours	Away colours	Third colours

The 2020–21 Fortuna Düsseldorf season was Fortuna Düsseldorf's 126th edition in existence and the first season return in the second flight of German football. In addition to the domestic league, Fortuna Düsseldorf contested in the DFB-Pokal. The season covered the period from 1 July 2020 to 30 June 2021.

== Review and events ==
Fortuna Düsseldorf started the 2020–21 season on 12 September 2020 against FC Ingolstadt 04 in the first round of the DFB-Pokal. Fortuna Düsseldorf won the match 1–0 against FC Ingolstadt 04. However, they were knocked out of the DFB–Pokal in the following round against Rot-Weiss Essen.

The first 2. Bundesliga match was against Hamburger SV on 18 September 2020. Fortuna Düsseldorf lost the match 2–1. Fortuna Düsseldorf's first league win came on 20 September 2020 against Würzburger Kickers. Fortuna Düsseldorf won 1–0. They finished September in 11th place. In October, they went on a three–match winless streak before winning the final match of the month. They lost matchday 3 and 5 against Holstein Kiel and Hannover 96 they drew matchday four 2–2 against Jahn Regensburg, and won matchday six against 1. FC Heidenheim. Fortuna Düsseldorf finished October tied for 12th place with SV Sandhausen. on 30 November 2020, Fortuna Düsseldorf lost to VfL Bochum 5–0. Fortuna Düsseldorf finished November in 12th place. Fortuna Düsseldorf won all four league matches in December. Fortuna Düsseldorf defeated SV Darmstadt 98, Karlsruher SC, VfL Osnabrück, and FC St. Pauli. Fortuna Düsseldorf finished December in fifth place. Fortuna Düsseldorf started 2021 with a win against SC Paderborn 07. This was their fifth win in a row. Their five–match winning streak finished when they drew Eintracht Braunschweig 0–0. A victory against Erzgebirge Aue on 16 January 2021 (matchday 16) put Fortuna Düsseldorf in third place for a playoff for promotion to the 2021–22 Bundesliga season. However, a draw against Greuther Fürth on 22 January 2021 (matchday 17) dropped Fortuna Düsseldorf down to fourth place and a 0–0 draw against Hamburg on 26 February 2021 (matchday 18) dropped Fortuna Düsseldorf down to fifth place. Fortuna Düsseldorf finished January with a 2–1 loss to Würzburger Kickers on 29 January 2021. Fortuna Düsseldorf finished January in sixth place. This was Fortuna Düsseldorf's first loss since losing 5–0 to Bochum.

== Pre-season and friendlies ==
Win Draw Loss Fixtures

18 August 2020 Friendly	Fortuna Düsseldorf	Cancelled	Wehen Wiesbaden	Düsseldorf, Germany
15:00 CEST (UTC+2)		Report		Stadium: Paul-Janes-Stadion

22 August 2020 Friendly	Fortuna Düsseldorf	1–0	VfL Bochum	Düsseldorf, Germany
15:00 CEST (UTC+2)	Karaman 44'			Stadium: Paul-Janes-Stadion

28 August 2020 Friendly	Vitesse	2–2	Fortuna Düsseldorf	Arnhem, Netherlands
18:00 CEST (UTC+2)	Tannane 31'; Bero 68'	Report	Darfalou 26' (o.g.); Hoffmann 45'	Stadium: GelreDome

8 October 2020 Friendly	Borussia Mönchengladbach	4–0	Fortuna Düsseldorf	Mönchengladbach, Germany
15:00 CEST (UTC+2)	Pléa 3'; Embolo 15', 58'; Stindl 84'	Report	Kownacki (yellow card)	Stadium: Fohlenplatz; Attendance: 300; Referee: Marc Borsch

== Competitions ==
=== Overview ===
Competition	First match	Last match	Starting round	Final position	Record							
Competition	First match	Last match	Starting round	Final position	Pld	W	D	L	GF	GA	GD	Win %
2. Bundesliga	18 September 2020	23 May 2021	Matchday 1	5th	34	16	8	10	55	46	+9	47.06
DFB-Pokal	12 September 2020	23 December 2020	First round	Second round	2	1	0	1	3	3	+0	50.00
Total					36	17	8	11	58	49	+9	47.22

Source: Soccerway

=== Bundesliga ===
==== League table ====
Pos	Team	Pld	W	D	L	GF	GA	GD	Pts	Qualification or relegation
3	Holstein Kiel	34	18	8	8	57	35	+22	62	Qualification for promotion play-offs
4	Hamburger SV	34	16	10	8	71	44	+27	58	
5	Fortuna Düsseldorf	34	16	8	10	55	46	+9	56	
6	Karlsruher SC	34	14	10	10	51	44	+7	52	
7	Darmstadt 98	34	15	6	13	63	55	+8	51	

Source: DFB
Rules for classification: 1) Points; 2) Goal difference; 3) Goals scored; 4) Head-to-head points; 5) Head-to-head goal difference; 6) Head-to-head away goals scored; 7) Away goals scored; 8) Play-off.

==== Results summary ====
Overall								Home						Away					
Pld	W	D	L	GF	GA	GD	Pts	W	D	L	GF	GA	GD	W	D	L	GF	GA	GD
34	16	8	10	55	46	+9	56	11	4	2	32	20	+12	5	4	8	23	26	−3

Source: kicker.de

==== Results by round ====
Round	1	2	3	4	5	6	7	8	9	10	11	12	13	14	15	16	17	18	19	20	21	22	23	24	25	26
Ground	A	H	A	H	A	H	A	H	A	H	A	H	A	H	A	A	H	H	A	H	A	H	A	H	A	H
Result	L	W	L	D	L	W	D	W	L	W	W	W	W	W	D	W	D	D	L	L	D	W	L			
Position	14	11	14	12	16	16	5	5	5	5	5	5	5	5	7	7	7	7	7	7	7	7	7			

Updated to match(es) played on 28 February 2021. Source: Soccerway
A = Away; H = Home; W = Win; D = Draw; L = Loss

==== Matches ====
The league fixtures were announced on 7 August 2020.

2. Bundesliga match details
Match	Date	Time	Opponent	Venue	Result F–A	Scorers	Attendance	Referee	Ref.
1	18 September 2020	18:30	Hamburger SV	Away	1–2	Zimmermann 90+3'	1,000	Dingert	
2	26 September 2020	13:00	Würzburger Kickers	Home	1–0	Kownacki 82'	7,500	Hartmann	
3	4 October 2020	13:30	Holstein Kiel	Away	1–2	Meffert 59' o.g.	1,973	Ittrich	
4	18 October 2020	13:30	Jahn Regensburg	Home	2–2	Karaman 81', Hennings 86'	0	Kampka	
5	24 October 2020	13:00	Hannover 96	Away	0–3		8,900	Dankert	
6	30 October 2020	18:30	1. FC Heidenheim	Home	1–0	Sobottka 33'	0	Stegemann	
7	7 November 2020	13:00	1. FC Nürnberg	Away	1–1	Karaman 30'	0	Schröder	
8	21 November 2020	13:00	SV Sandhausen	Home	1–0	Hennings 59' pen.	0	Schlager	
9	30 November 2020	20:30	VfL Bochum	Away	0–5		0	Willenborg	
10	4 December 2020	18:30	Darmstadt 98	Home	3–2	Hennings 56', Karaman 77', Kownacki 89'	0	Alt	
11	13 December 2020	13:30	Karlsruher SC	Away	2–1	Krajnc 12', Peterson 57'	0	Reichel	
12	16 December 2020	18:30	VfL Osnabrück	Home	3–0	Appelkamp 11', Hennings (2) 89', 90+2'	0	Lechner	
13	20 December 2020	13:30	FC St. Pauli	Away	3–0	Zimmermann 10', Hennings 64', Prib 90+3'	0	Schröder	
14	4 January 2021	20:30	SC Paderborn	Home	2–1	Peterson 22', Karaman 55'	0	Aarnink	
15	11 January 2021	20:30	Eintracht Braunschweig	Away	0–0		0	Sather	
16	16 January 2021	13:00	Erzgebirge Aue	Away	3–0	Kownacki 24', Karaman 82', Pledl 89'	0	Günsch	
17	22 January 2021	18:30	Greuther Fürth	Home	3–3	Karaman 35', Peterson 49', Danso 83'	0	Willenborg	
18	26 January 2021	20:30	Hamburger SV	Home	0–0		0	Cortus	
19	29 January 2021	18:30	Würzburger Kickers	Away	1–2	Hennings 25'	0	Schmidt	
20	8 February 2021	20:30	Holstein Kiel	Home	0–2		0	Storks	
21	13 February 2021	13:00	Jahn Regensburg	Away	1–1	Karaman 52'	0	Gerach	
22	21 February 2021	13:30	Hannover 96	Home	3–2	Hennings 28' pen., Klaus 52', Appelkamp 76'	0	Zwayer	
23	28 February 2021	13:30	1. FC Heidenheim	Away	2–3	Sobottka 63', Peterson 76'	0	Heft	
24	7 March 2021	13:30	1. FC Nürnberg	Home	3–1	Hoffmann 48', Sobottka 77', Sorg 90+5' o.g.	0	Petersen	
25	13 March 2021	13:00	SV Sandhausen	Away	0–0		0	Kampka	
26	22 March 2021	20:30	VfL Bochum	Home	0–3		0	Aytekin	
27	4 April 2021	13:30	Darmstadt 98	Away	2–1	Krajnc 20', Kownacki 62'	0	Reichel	
29	18 April 2021	13:30	VfL Osnabrück	Away	3–0	Peterson 37', Kownacki 50' pen., Sobottka 67'	0	Jablonski	
30	21 April 2021	18:30	FC St. Pauli	Home	2–0	Klaus 26', Danso 48'	0	Bacher	
31	24 April 2021	13:00	SC Paderborn	Away	1–2	Hennings 64'	0	Aarnink	
28	3 May 2021	20:30	Karlsruher SC	Home	3–2	Kownacki 35' pen., Borrello 73', Appelkamp 90+5'	0	Alt	
32	8 May 2021	13:00	Eintracht Braunschweig	Home	2–2	Kownacki 42' pen., Appelkamp 60'	0	Reichel	
33	16 May 2021	15:30	Erzgebirge Aue	Home	3–0	Appelkamp 10', Sobottka 18', Peterson 87'	0	Cortus	
34	23 May 2021	15:30	Greuther Fürth	Away	2–3	Peterson 26', Appelkamp 56'	0	Osmers	

=== DFB-Pokal ===
Date	Round	Opponent	Venue	Result F–A	Goalscorers	Attendance	Ref.
12 September 2020	First round	FC Ingolstadt 04	Away	1–0	Pledl	0	
23 December 2020	Second round	Rot-Weiss Essen	Away	2–3	Hennings (2)	0	

== Player details ==
=== First-team squad ===
As of 9 October 2020

Note: Flags indicate national team as defined under FIFA eligibility rules; some limited exceptions apply. Players may hold more than one non-FIFA nationality.

No.	Pos.	Nation	Player
1	GK	GER	Raphael Wolf
3	MF	GER	André Hoffmann
4	DF	AUT	Kevin Danso (on loan from Augsburg)
5	DF	AUT	Christoph Klarer
6	MF	USA	Alfredo Morales
7	DF	GER	Florian Hartherz
8	MF	POL	Jakub Piotrowski
9	FW	POL	Dawid Kownacki
11	FW	TUR	Kenan Karaman
12	MF	SWE	Kristoffer Peterson
13	MF	POL	Adam Bodzek (captain)
14	FW	GHA	Kelvin Ofori
15	MF	GER	Edgar Prib
18	MF	GER	Thomas Pledl
19	FW	GER	Emmanuel Iyoha

No.	Pos.	Nation	Player
20	FW	AUS	Brandon Borrello (on loan from SC Freiburg)
21	GK	GER	Dennis Gorka
22	DF	GRE	Leonardo Koutris (on loan from Olympiacos)
23	MF	JPN	Shinta Appelkamp
25	DF	GER	Matthias Zimmermann
28	FW	GER	Rouwen Hennings
29	MF	GER	Gökhan Gül
30	GK	RUS	Anton Mitryushkin
31	MF	GER	Marcel Sobottka
32	DF	SLO	Luka Krajnc (on loan from Frosinone)
33	GK	GER	Florian Kastenmeier
36	DF	GER	Nikell Touglo
39	DF	GER	Jean Zimmer
43	DF	GER	Jamil Siebert

== Transfers ==
=== Out on loan ===
Note: Flags indicate national team as defined under FIFA eligibility rules; some limited exceptions apply. Players may hold more than one non-FIFA nationality.

No.	Pos.	Nation	Player
—	FW	GHA	Nana Ampomah (on loan to Royal Antwerp until 30 June 2022)
