= Kristoffer Peterson =

Swedish footballer (born 1994)

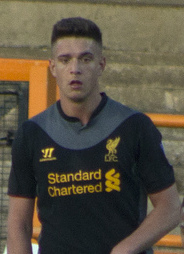
- Peterson playing for Liverpool under-21s in 2012

Personal information
- Full name: Kristoffer Paul Peterson
- Date of birth: 28 November 1994 (age 31)
- Place of birth: Gothenburg, Sweden
- Height: 1.85 m (6 ft 1 in)
- Position: Winger

Team information
- Current team: Fortuna Sittard
- Number: 7

Youth career
- –2010: Sävedalens IF
- 2011–2014: Liverpool

Senior career*
| Years | Team | Apps | (Gls) |
| 2013–2014 | Liverpool | 0 | (0) |
| 2013–2014 | → Tranmere Rovers (loan) | 6 | (0) |
| 2014–2017 | Utrecht | 30 | (3) |
| 2016 | → Roda JC (loan) | 14 | (1) |
| 2016–2017 | Jong FC Utrecht | 9 | (2) |
| 2017–2019 | Heracles Almelo | 81 | (23) |
| 2019–2020 | Swansea City | 7 | (0) |
| 2020 | → FC Utrecht (loan) | 6 | (1) |
| 2020–2023 | Fortuna Düsseldorf | 81 | (12) |
| 2023 | Hapoel Be'er Sheva | 5 | (0) |
| 2024– | Fortuna Sittard | 82 | (10) |

International career^{‡}
| 2009–2011 | Sweden U17 | 6 | (2) |
| 2014–2015 | Sweden U21 | 7 | (1) |
| 2018 | Sweden | 1 | (0) |
- * Club domestic league appearances and goals as of 21 May 2026 ‡ National team caps and goals as of 16 October 2018

Kristoffer Paul Peterson (born 28 November 1994) is a Swedish professional footballer who plays as a winger for Eredivisie club Fortuna Sittard.

== Club career ==
=== Liverpool ===
Peterson arrived at the Liverpool Academy from Sävedalens IF in January 2011.

He made his debut for the Under-18s in the 2010–11 season, however he would only play the one match for the Under-18s that season as he featured more frequently for the Under-16s. During the 2011–12 season, operating mostly as a midfielder, Peterson figured for the Under-18s far more prominently, and produced some eye-catching performances from the centre of the park. He was one of the stand-out performers for the side, netting five goals in 22 games. His good form brought him to the attention of Reserve team coach Rodolfo Borrell, who used the young starlet as a second-half substitute in the Under-19s NextGen Series tie against Molde FK. He also featured in the NextGen Series third place play-off tie against Olympique de Marseille.

Now operating further up the pitch, often in a wide forward role, in the 2012–13 season, Peterson continued as one of the U18's star players. He featured 23 times and scored nine goals and also made his step up to the U21s, for whom he featured 13 times - seven of which came in the NextGen Series. Peterson kicked on in the 2013–14 U21s season as he netted all three of Liverpool's goals in their four pre-season friendlies, with goals against Northern Irish club Glentoran, Scottish club Heart of Midlothian and Italian club Bologna's first teams.

==== Loan to Tranmere Rovers ====
On 28 November 2013, his 19th birthday, Peterson was loaned to League One side, Tranmere Rovers. Two days later, he made his debut against Colchester United in a 2–1 win at Prenton Park and was awarded Man of the Match, with his manager Ronnie Moore predicting that "he's going to play at the top level."

==== Return to Liverpool ====
In January 2014, he signed an extension to his contract with Liverpool and said he would use it to spur him on: "This is the biggest motivation boost in my career. This is the biggest I have ever experienced".

He completed the U21s season at Liverpool with 6 goals and 15 appearances to his name. He went on to appear as a substitute in the Liverpool first team's post-season friendly win over Irish club Shamrock Rovers at the Aviva Stadium, replacing Iago Aspas in a 4–0 win, being handed the number 54 shirt on 14 May 2014. On 16 July 2014, Peterson came on as a second-half substitute in Liverpool's pre-season match away to Brøndby, and netted a tap-in in the 49th minute after good work from Jordon Ibe. He also scored again in Liverpool's next pre-season match, away at Preston, netting the winner in a 2–1 win. After the game, manager Brendan Rodgers confirmed he would now take Peterson on Liverpool's pre-season tour of America, having initially failed to make the cut, along with most of the club's younger players.

=== Utrecht ===
On 27 August 2014, Peterson joined Dutch club FC Utrecht on a four-year deal.

=== Heracles Almelo ===
In January 2017, Peterson joined league rivals Heracles Almelo on a two-and-a-half-year contract with the option a further year. He was voted Eredivisie player of the month for September 2018, after some impressive and eye catching performances for Heracles Almelo.

=== Swansea City ===
Peterson signed for Championship club Swansea City on 2 August 2019, reuniting with head coach Steve Cooper, whom he had worked with at Liverpool's academy. He made his debut for the club as a substitute in a 2–1 win against Hull City one day later. He scored his first goal for Swansea in an EFL Cup tie against Cambridge United on 28 August 2019.

=== Fortuna Düsseldorf ===
On 5 October 2020, Peterson joined Fortuna Düsseldorf for an undisclosed fee, subject to international clearance. He signed a three-year contract.

=== Hapoel Be'er Sheva ===
On 21 June 2023, Peterson signed a three-year contract with Israeli Premier League club Hapoel Be'er Sheva.

=== Fortuna Sittard ===
On 9 January 2024, Peterson returned to the Netherlands and signed a two-and-a-half-year contract with Fortuna Sittard.

== International career ==
On 3 October 2018, Peterson earned his first call-up to the Swedish senior national team for a UEFA Nations League game against Russia and a friendly game against Slovakia, following a string of strong performances for his club team Heracles. He made his international debut against Slovakia on 16 October 2018.

== Career statistics ==
As of match played on 13 May 2023

Club statistics
| Club | Season | League | | | National Cup | | League Cup | | Other | | Total | |
| Club | Season | Division | Apps | Goals | Apps | Goals | Apps | Goals | Apps | Goals | Apps | Goals |
|---|---|---|---|---|---|---|---|---|---|---|---|---|
| Liverpool | 2013–14 | Premier League | 0 | 0 | 0 | 0 | 0 | 0 | — | | 0 | 0 |
| Tranmere Rovers (loan) | 2013–14 | League One | 6 | 0 | 1 | 0 | 0 | 0 | — | | 7 | 0 |
| Utrecht | 2014–15 | Eredivisie | 20 | 2 | 1 | 0 | — | | — | | 21 | 2 |
| Utrecht | 2015–16 | Eredivisie | 7 | 0 | 2 | 1 | — | | — | | 9 | 1 |
| Utrecht | 2016–17 | Eredivisie | 3 | 1 | 1 | 0 | — | | — | | 4 | 1 |
| Utrecht | Total | | 30 | 3 | 4 | 1 | 0 | 0 | 0 | 0 | 34 | 4 |
| Roda JC Kerkrade (loan) | 2015–16 | Eredivisie | 14 | 1 | 1 | 0 | — | | — | | 15 | 1 |
| Jong FC Utrecht | 2016–17 | Eerste Divisie | 9 | 2 | 0 | 0 | — | | — | | 9 | 2 |
| Heracles Almelo | 2016–17 | Eredivisie | 15 | 4 | 0 | 0 | — | | — | | 15 | 4 |
| Heracles Almelo | 2017–18 | Eredivisie | 33 | 7 | 3 | 2 | — | | — | | 36 | 9 |
| Heracles Almelo | 2018–19 | Eredivisie | 33 | 12 | 2 | 0 | — | | — | | 35 | 12 |
| Heracles Almelo | Total | | 81 | 23 | 5 | 2 | 0 | 0 | 0 | 0 | 86 | 25 |
| Swansea City | 2019–20 | Championship | 7 | 0 | 1 | 0 | 3 | 1 | — | | 11 | 1 |
| Swansea City | 2020–21 | Championship | 0 | 0 | 0 | 0 | 1 | 0 | — | | 1 | 0 |
| Swansea City | Total | | 7 | 0 | 1 | 0 | 4 | 1 | 0 | 0 | 12 | 1 |
| Utrecht (loan) | 2019–20 | Eredivisie | 6 | 1 | 2 | 1 | — | | — | | 8 | 2 |
| Fortuna Düsseldorf | 2020–21 | 2. Bundesliga | 26 | 7 | 1 | 0 | — | | — | | 27 | 7 |
| Fortuna Düsseldorf | 2021–22 | 2. Bundesliga | 27 | 1 | 1 | 0 | — | | — | | 28 | 1 |
| Fortuna Düsseldorf | 2022–23 | 2. Bundesliga | 27 | 4 | 3 | 2 | — | | — | | 30 | 6 |
| Fortuna Düsseldorf | Total | | 80 | 12 | 5 | 2 | 0 | 0 | 0 | 0 | 85 | 14 |
| Fortuna Düsseldorf II | 2022–23 | Regionalliga West | 1 | 0 | — | | — | | — | | 1 | 0 |
| Hapoel Be'er Sheva | 2023–24 | Israeli Premier League | 0 | 0 | 0 | 0 | 0 | 0 | — | | 0 | 0 |
| Hapoel Be'er Sheva | Total | | 0 | 0 | 0 | 0 | 0 | 0 | 0 | 0 | 0 | 0 |
| Career totals | | | 234 | 42 | 19 | 6 | 4 | 1 | 0 | 0 | 257 | 49 |

=== International ===
Appearances and goals by national team and year

| National team | Year | Apps | Goals |
|---|---|---|---|
| Sweden | 2018 | 1 | 0 |
| Total | | 1 | 0 |

== Honours ==
Individual

- Eredivisie Player of the Month: September 2018
