= Emmanuel Iyoha =

German footballer

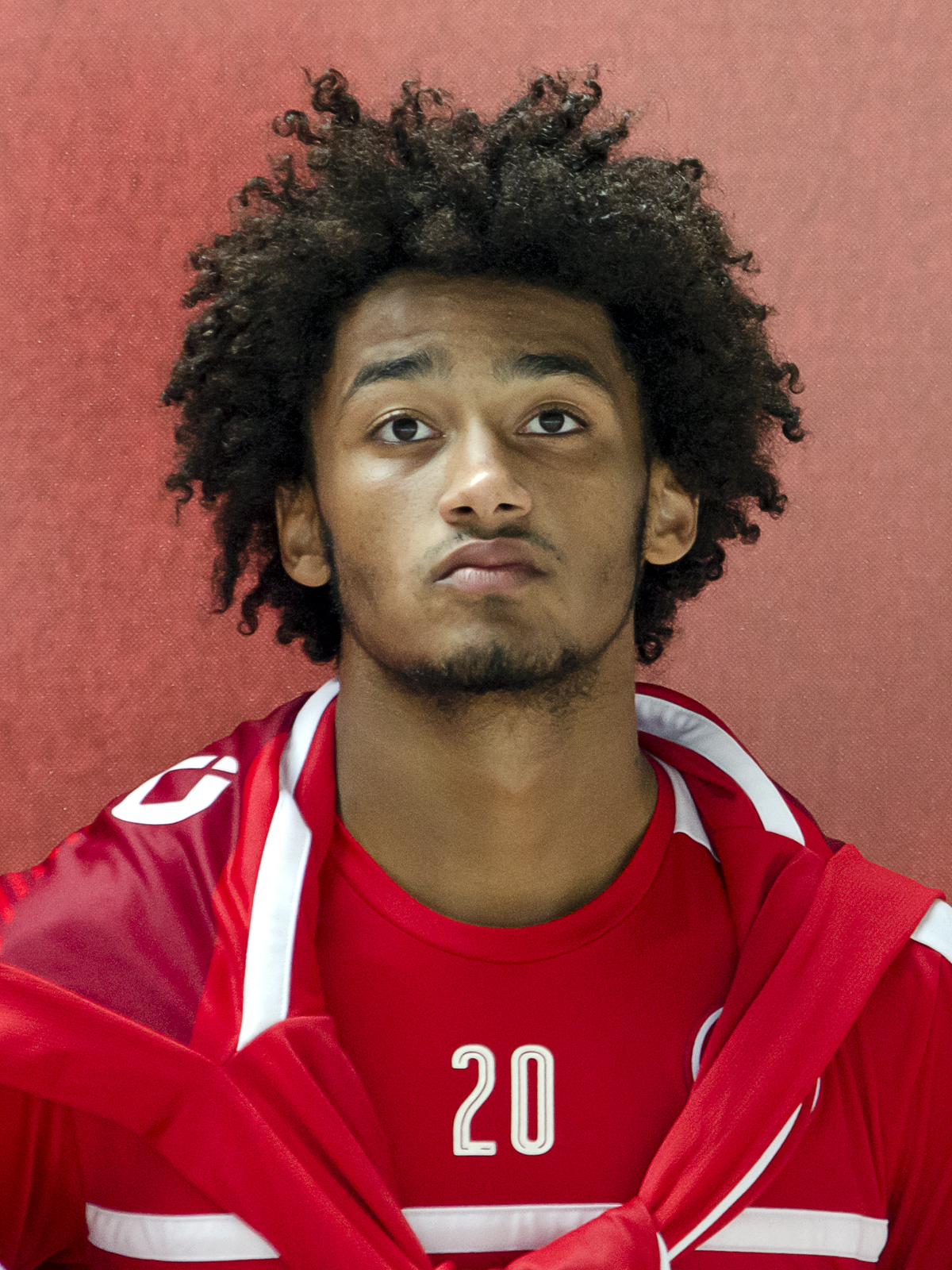
- Iyoha with Fortuna Düsseldorf in 2016

Personal information
- Full name: Emmanuel Edosa Iyoha
- Date of birth: 11 October 1997 (age 29)
- Place of birth: Düsseldorf, Germany
- Height: 1.91 m (6 ft 3 in)
- Position: Defender

Team information
- Current team: 1. FC Magdeburg
- Number: 8

Youth career
- 2012–2015: Fortuna Düsseldorf

Senior career*
Years	Team	Apps	(Gls)
2015–2018	Fortuna Düsseldorf II	16	(4)
2015–2026	Fortuna Düsseldorf	145	(8)
2017–2018	→ VfL Osnabrück (loan)	25	(4)
2018–2019	→ Erzgebirge Aue (loan)	29	(3)
2019–2020	→ Holstein Kiel (loan)	29	(9)
2026–	1. FC Magdeburg	0	(0)

International career^{‡}
2015–2016	Germany U19	5	(0)
2016–2017	Germany U20	7	(1)
2019	Germany U21	2	(0)
- * Club domestic league appearances and goals as of 18 May 2026 ‡ National team caps and goals as of 26 March 2019

Emmanuel Edosa Iyoha (born 11 October 1997) is a German professional footballer who plays as a defender for 2. Bundesliga club 1. FC Magdeburg.

== Early career ==
In 2011, Iyoha joined the youth academy of his hometown club Fortuna Düsseldorf from Bayer 04 Leverkusen and progressed from U15 to U19.

Five years later, Iyoha signed his first professional contract with Düsseldorf and developed further with loan spells at VfL Osnabrück, Erzgebirge Aue and Holstein Kiel.

On 16 July 2026, Iyoha signed with 1. FC Magdeburg.

== Career statistics ==
As of 28 July 2023

Appearances and goals by club, season and competition
Club	Season	League			Cup		Other		Total	
Club	Season	Division	Apps	Goals	Apps	Goals	Apps	Goals	Apps	Goals
Fortuna Düsseldorf II	2014–15	Regionalliga West	4	0	—		—		4	0
Fortuna Düsseldorf II	2016–17	Regionalliga West	8	2	—		—		8	2
Fortuna Düsseldorf II	2017–18	Regionalliga West	4	2	—		—		4	2
Fortuna Düsseldorf II	2021–22	Regionalliga West	1	2	—		—		1	2
Fortuna Düsseldorf	2015–16	2. Bundesliga	5	0	0	0	—		5	0
Fortuna Düsseldorf	2016–17	2. Bundesliga	17	0	0	0	—		17	0
Fortuna Düsseldorf	2020–21	2. Bundesliga	7	0	0	0	—		7	0
Fortuna Düsseldorf	2021–22	2. Bundesliga	17	1	0	0	—		17	1
Fortuna Düsseldorf	2022–23	2. Bundesliga	28	4	2	1	—		30	5
Fortuna Düsseldorf	2023–24	2. Bundesliga					—			
Fortuna Düsseldorf	Total		74	5	2	1	–		76	6
VfL Osnabrück (loan)	2017–18	3. Liga	25	4	0	0	—		25	4
Erzgebirge Aue (loan)	2018–19	2. Bundesliga	29	3	1	0	—		30	3
Holstein Kiel (loan)	2019–20	2. Bundesliga	29	9	2	0	—		31	9
Career total			174	27	5	1	–		179	28
