= Florian Hartherz =

German footballer (born 1993)

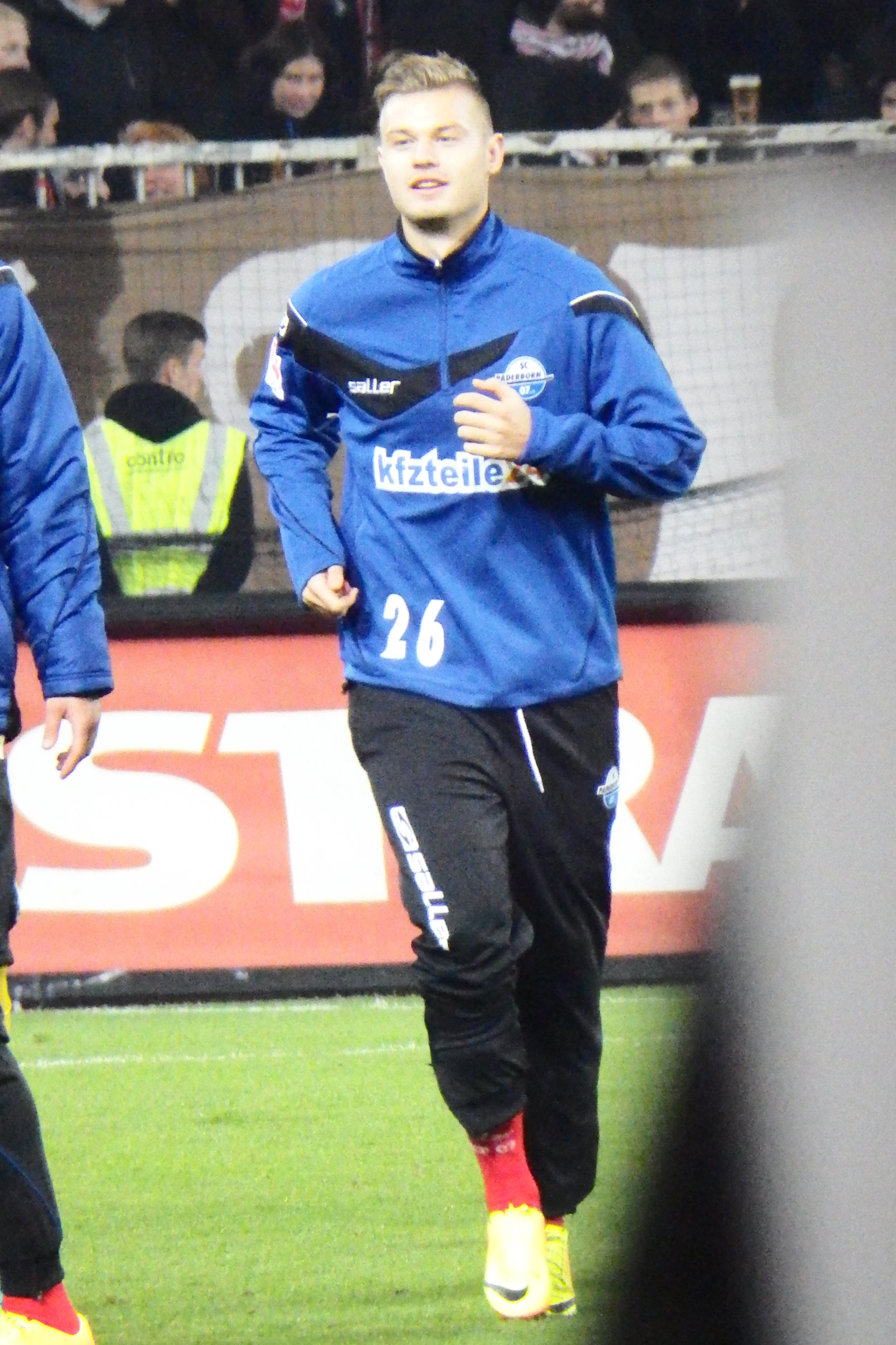
- Hartherz with SC Paderborn in 2013

Personal information
- Date of birth: 29 May 1993 (age 33)
- Place of birth: Offenbach am Main, Germany
- Height: 1.84 m (6 ft 0 in)
- Position: Left-back

Team information
- Current team: FC Koper
- Number: 3

Youth career
- 1997–2002: TV Hausen 1873
- 2002–2003: Kickers Offenbach
- 2003–2004: SpVgg Dietesheim
- 2004–2005: SG Rosenhöhe Offenbach
- 2004–2009: Eintracht Frankfurt
- 2009–2011: VfL Wolfsburg

Senior career*
Years	Team	Apps	(Gls)
2011	VfL Wolfsburg II	2	(0)
2011–2013	Werder Bremen II	26	(1)
2011–2013	Werder Bremen	10	(0)
2013–2016	SC Paderborn	46	(1)
2016–2020	Arminia Bielefeld	116	(4)
2020–2022	Fortuna Düsseldorf	32	(1)
2020	Fortuna Düsseldorf II	1	(1)
2022–2023	Maccabi Netanya	8	(0)
2023	Podbeskidzie Bielsko-Biała	15	(1)
2023–2025	Miedź Legnica	45	(3)
2025–	FC Koper	18	(0)

International career
2009–2010	Germany U17	6	(0)
2010–2011	Germany U18	9	(0)
2011–2012	Germany U19	8	(0)
2012–2013	Germany U20	4	(0)
- * Club domestic league appearances and goals as of 22:10, 30 July 2026 (UTC)

Florian Hartherz (born 29 May 1993) is a German professional footballer who plays as a left-back for Slovenian club FC Koper. He is a former Germany youth international, having played for Germany at under-17, under-18, under-19 and under-20 levels.

Hartherz started his senior career with VfL Wolfsburg II, before joining Werder Bremen in 2011. At Werder Bremen, he played both for the club's first team in the Bundesliga and for Werder Bremen II. In September 2013, Hartherz joined SC Paderborn of the 2. Bundesliga, and was promoted to the Bundesliga with the club in his debut season. The club were relegated back to the Bundesliga a year later however, and Hartherz joined Arminia Bielefeld in summer 2016. After four years with Arminia Bielefeld, the club were promoted to the Bundesliga in summer 2020, though he was released by the club that summer after his contract was not extended. He then played in the 2. Bundesliga for Fortuna Düsseldorf between 2020 and 2022, and has since played in Poland with Podbeskidzie Bielsko-Biała and Miedź Legnica, and in Slovenia with FC Koper.

== Club career ==
=== Early career ===
Hartherz was born in Offenbach am Main. He played youth football for TV Hausen 1873, Kickers Offenbach, SpVgg Dietesheim, SG Rosenhöhe Offenbach, Eintracht Frankfurt and VfL Wolfsburg, and won the Under 19 Bundesliga with Wolfsburg in the 2010–11 season. He also made two appearances in the Regionalliga Nord for VfL Wolfsburg II.

=== Werder Bremen ===
On 31 August 2011, Hartherz joined Werder Bremen and signed a professional contract with the club. He made 10 appearances for the club's reserve side prior to the winter break. Following the winter break, he made his Bundesliga debut for the club on 28 January 2012 amidst injury problems for Werder Bremen, starting in a 1–1 draw with Bayer Leverkusen, and retained his place in Bremen's starting eleven for following matches, making 10 consecutive Bundesliga starts before suffering an injury. He did not appear again for the Werder Bremen in the Bundesliga following his return from injury, either in the 2011–12 or 2012–13 season, though he played 18 times for the reserve team, scoring once, during the 2012–13 season.

=== SC Paderborn ===
Hartherz transferred to 2. Bundesliga club SC Paderborn on a two-year contract in September 2013, alongside fellow Werder Bremen youngster Johannes Wurtz. He made his debut for the club on 13 September, starting in a 1–0 home win over Karlsruher SC, and made 11 2. Bundesliga appearances in total, as Paderborn were promoted to the Bundesliga after finishing second in the 2. Bundesliga.

On 22 November 2014, he was given his first start, and second appearance, of the 2014–15 season, in a 2–2 draw at home to Borussia Dortmund. Hartherz's performances for Paderborn across the 2014–15 season were "inconsistent", as he played 10 times in total in the Bundesliga, including in the final match of the season, a 2–1 home defeat to VfB Stuttgart, which relegated Paderborn back to the 2. Bundesliga. With Hartherz's contract set to expire, he signed a new two-year contract with the club in June 2015.

He played 25 times in the 2. Bundesliga across the 2015–16 season, scoring once, as Paderborn finished bottom of the league, and were relegated again, this time to the 3. Liga.

=== Arminia Bielefeld ===
In summer 2016, he joined 2. Bundesliga club Arminia Bielefeld on a two-year contract. He played 25 times in the league in his debut season at the club, many of which came at left midfield instead of his usual left back position. Across the 2017–18 season, he scored three goals in 33 2. Bundesliga appearances. One of his goals was a free kick scored away to VfL Bochum on 29 January, which was nominated for the ARD Sportschau Goal of the Month for January 2018. In February 2018, his contract with Bielefeld was extended until summer 2020.

He scored once in 26 2. Bundesliga games across the 2018–19 season, though lost his regular place in the team to Anderson Lucoqui in the second half of the season. He started 31 of Arminia Bielefeld's 34 games in their 2019–20 2. Bundesliga title-winning campaign, though his contract expired in summer 2020 and was not extended by Bielefeld, who had instead signed Danish left back Jacob Barrett Laursen.

=== Fortuna Düsseldorf ===
In August 2020, Hatherz signed for Fortuna Düsseldorf on a free transfer, signing a two-year contract. He was initially a regular starter for the club but soon lost his starting place at left back to loanee Leonardo Koutris, partially due to an achilles injury, and made just 12 appearances (and seven starts) in the 2. Bundesliga in the 2020–21. He made 20 2. Bundesliga appearances in the 2021–22 season, and scored his only goal for the club in a 1–1 draw away at former club SC Paderborn, but played just 24 minutes across the last six matches of the season, and was released at the end of the season after his contract expired.

=== Later career ===
In June 2022, Hartherz signed for Israeli Premier League club Maccabi Netanya on a one-year contract with the option for a further year, but he played just eleven times in all competitions for the club before being told he was not in their first-team plans in November 2022. He transferred to Polish I liga club Podbeskidzie Bielsko-Biała on February 2023 on a contract until the end of the season, and scored once in 15 matches for the club, attracting praise from Piotr Janas of TVP Sport who described him as one of the best left backs in the I liga.

In June 2023, Hartherz signed for Polish side Miedź Legnica on a three-year contract. He played 45 times for the club in the I liga, scoring three goals, before signing for Slovenian club FC Koper on a two-year contract on 22 August 2025.

== International career ==
He represented Germany internationally at under-17, under-18, under-19 and under-20 levels between 2009 and 2013, amassing a combined 27 appearances for Germany youth international teams.

== Style of play ==
Hartherz is a left-footed left back. He has also played as a left midfielder. During his time at Arminia Bielefeld, Hartherz divided supporter opinion; he was noted as a hard-working and energetic player though also noted as technically limited and prone to errors.

== Career statistics ==
As of match played 30 July 2026

Appearances and goals by club, season and competition
Club	Season	League			National cup (Note: Includes DFB-Pokal, Israel State Cup, Polish Cup and Slovenian Football Cup)		Other		Total	
Club	Season	Division	Apps	Goals	Apps	Goals	Apps	Goals	Apps	Goals
VfL Wolfsburg II	2010–11	Regionalliga Nord	1	0	—		0	0	1	0
VfL Wolfsburg II	2011–12	Regionalliga Nord	1	0	—		0	0	1	0
VfL Wolfsburg II	Total		2	0	0	0	0	0	2	0
Werder Bremen II	2011–12	3. Liga	10	0	—		0	0	10	0
Werder Bremen II	2012–13	Regionalliga Nord	18	1	—		0	0	18	1
Werder Bremen II	Total		28	1	0	0	0	0	28	1
Werder Bremen	2011–12	Bundesliga	10	0	0	0	0	0	10	0
Werder Bremen	2012–13	Bundesliga	0	0	0	0	0	0	0	0
Werder Bremen	2013–14	Bundesliga	0	0	1	0	0	0	1	0
Werder Bremen	Total		10	0	1	0	0	0	11	0
SC Paderborn	2013–14	2. Bundesliga	11	0	1	0	0	0	12	0
SC Paderborn	2014–15	Bundesliga	10	0	1	0	0	0	11	0
SC Paderborn	2015–16	2. Bundesliga	25	1	1	0	0	0	26	1
SC Paderborn	Total		46	1	3	0	0	0	49	1
Arminia Bielefeld	2016–17	2. Bundesliga	25	0	2	0	0	0	27	0
Arminia Bielefeld	2017–18	2. Bundesliga	33	3	1	0	0	0	34	3
Arminia Bielefeld	2018–19	2. Bundesliga	26	1	2	0	0	0	28	1
Arminia Bielefeld	2019–20	2. Bundesliga	32	0	1	0	0	0	33	0
Arminia Bielefeld	Total		116	4	6	0	0	0	122	4
Fortuna Düsseldorf	2020–21	2. Bundesliga	12	0	1	0	0	0	13	0
Fortuna Düsseldorf	2021–22	2. Bundesliga	20	1	2	0	0	0	22	1
Fortuna Düsseldorf	Total		32	1	3	0	0	0	35	1
Fortuna Düsseldorf II	2020–21	Regionalliga West	1	1	—		0	0	1	1
Maccabi Netanya	2022–23	Israeli Premier League	8	0	0	0	3 (Note: Two appearances in UEFA Conference League, one appearance in Toto Cup)	0	11	0
Podbeskidzie Bielsko-Biała	2022–23	I liga	15	1	0	0	0	0	15	1
Miedź Legnica	2023–24	I liga	14	0	0	0	0	0	14	0
Miedź Legnica	2024–25	I liga	30	3	2	0	1 (Note: Appearance(s) in I liga promotion play-offs)	0	33	3
Miedź Legnica	2025–26	I liga	1	0	0	0	0	0	1	0
Miedź Legnica	Total		45	3	2	0	1	0	48	3
FC Koper	2025–26	Slovenian PrvaLiga	16	0	1	0	0	0	17	0
FC Koper	2026–27	Slovenian PrvaLiga	2	0	0	0	2 (Note: Appearances in UEFA Conference League)	0	4	0
FC Koper	Total		18	0	1	0	2	0	21	0
Career total			306	12	16	0	6	0	328	12
