= Shinta Appelkamp =

German footballer (born 2000)

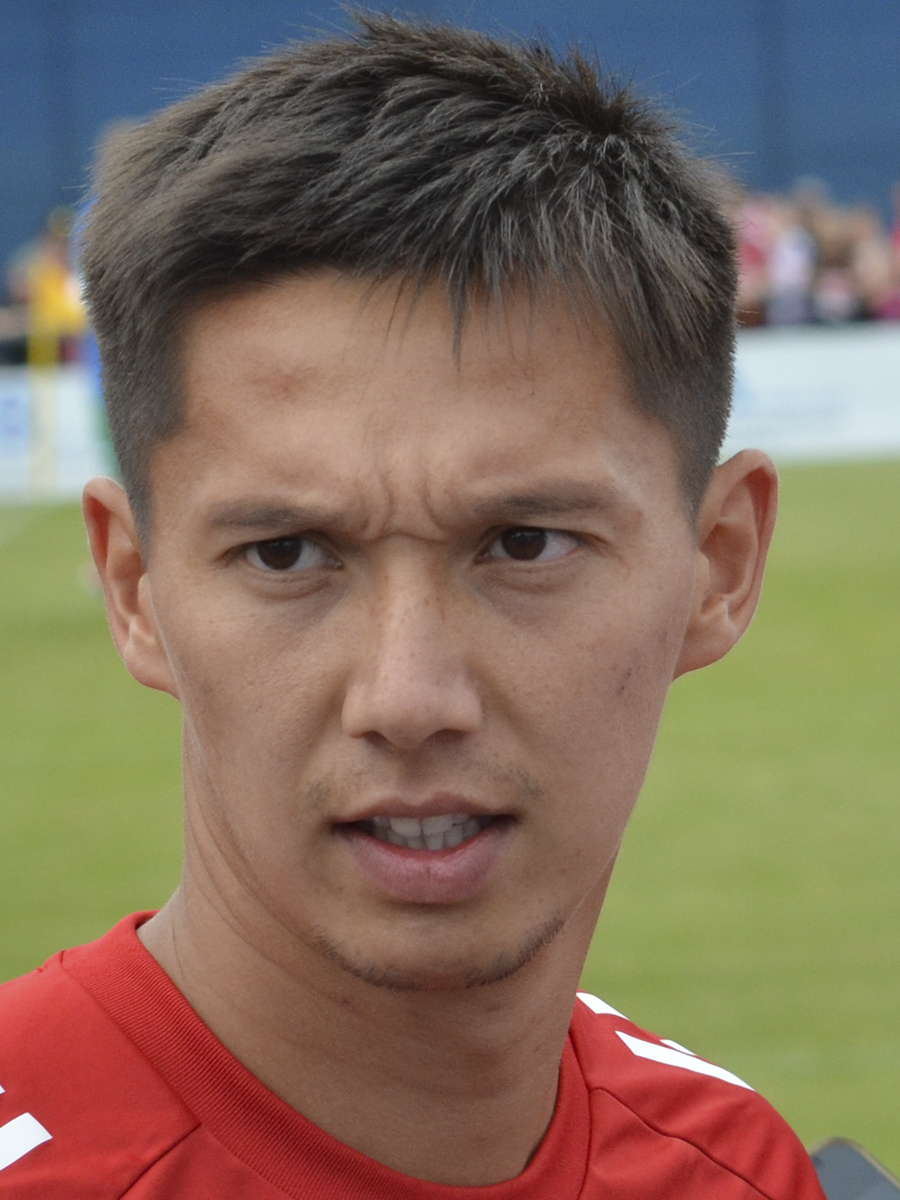

Personal information
- Full name: Shinta Karl Appelkamp
- Date of birth: 1 November 2000 (age 26)
- Place of birth: Setagaya, Tokyo, Japan
- Height: 1.75 m (5 ft 9 in)
- Position: Midfielder

Team information
- Current team: Greuther Fürth
- Number: 8

Youth career
- –2015: Mitsubishi Yowa
- 2015–2019: Fortuna Düsseldorf

Senior career*
Years	Team	Apps	(Gls)
2019–2020	Fortuna Düsseldorf II	24	(8)
2020–2026	Fortuna Düsseldorf	159	(21)
2026–	Greuther Fürth	0	(0)

International career^{‡}
2017	Japan U17	3	(0)
2018	Japan U18	2	(0)
2021	Germany U21	2	(0)
Medal record
Men's football
Representing Germany
UEFA European Under-21 Championship
Winner	2021
- * Club domestic league appearances and goals as of 18 May 2026 ‡ National team caps and goals as of 2 September 2021

Shinta Karl Appelkamp (アペルカンプ 真大 カール, Aperukanpu Shinta Kāru; born 1 November 2000) is a German professional footballer who plays as a midfielder for 2. Bundesliga club Greuther Fürth. Born in Japan, Appelkamp was a youth international for Japan before switching to represent Germany.

== Club career ==
Appelkamp made his professional debut for Fortuna Düsseldorf in the 2. Bundesliga on 26 September 2020, coming on as a substitute in 62nd minute of the team's 1–0 home win against Würzburger Kickers.

On 17 June 2026, following Fortuna's relegation to the 3. Liga, Appelkamp signed for Greuther Fürth.

== International career ==
Appelkamp was born in Japan to a German father and Japanese mother. He was a youth international for Japan, switching to Germany in 2021.

== Career statistics ==
As of 28 May 2023

Appearances and goals by club, season and competition
Club	Season	League			DFB-Pokal		Europe		Other		Total	
Club	Season	Division	Apps	Goals	Apps	Goals	Apps	Goals	Apps	Goals	Apps	Goals
Fortuna Düsseldorf II	2018–19	Regionalliga West	5	1	—		—		—		5	1
Fortuna Düsseldorf II	2019–20	Regionalliga West	19	8	—		—		—		19	8
Fortuna Düsseldorf II	Total		24	9	—		—		—		24	9
Fortuna Düsseldorf	2019–20	Bundesliga	0	0	0	0	—		—		0	0
Fortuna Düsseldorf	2020–21	2. Bundesliga	21	6	1	0	—		—		22	6
Fortuna Düsseldorf	2021–22	2. Bundesliga	26	3	1	0	—		—		27	3
Fortuna Düsseldorf	2022–23	2. Bundesliga	33	6	3	0	—		—		36	6
Fortuna Düsseldorf	2023–24	2. Bundesliga					—					
Fortuna Düsseldorf	Total		80	15	5	0	—		—		85	15
Career total			104	24	5	0	—		—		109	24
