= Christoph Klarer =

Austrian footballer

Personal information
- Full name: Christoph Klarer
- Date of birth: 14 June 2000 (age 26)
- Place of birth: Böheimkirchen, Austria
- Height: 1.91 m (6 ft 3 in)
- Position: Centre back

Team information
- Current team: Birmingham City
- Number: 4

Youth career
- –2011: SV Böheimkirchen
- 2011–2016: Rapid Wien
- 2016–2020: Southampton

Senior career*
Years	Team	Apps	(Gls)
2020	Southampton	0	(0)
2020	→ St. Pölten (loan)	13	(0)
2020–2023	Fortuna Düsseldorf	74	(5)
2023–2024	Darmstadt 98	30	(2)
2024–	Birmingham City	97	(5)

International career
2014–2015	Austria U15	3	(0)
2015–2016	Austria U16	6	(1)
2016–2017	Austria U17	11	(1)
2017	Austria U18	3	(0)
2018	Austria U19	4	(0)
2020–2022	Austria U21	12	(0)
- * Club domestic league appearances and goals as of 17:10, 13 December 2025 (UTC)

Christoph Klarer (born 14 June 2000) is an Austrian professional footballer who plays as a centre back for EFL Championship club Birmingham City, whom he captains.

== Career ==
=== Southampton ===
On 8 July 2016, Southampton confirmed that they had signed Klarer on a professional contract from Rapid Wien. Klarer started for the club's U18 squad. In April 2019, he signed a new contract until the summer 2021.

On 7 January 2020, Klarer joined Austrian club SKN St. Pölten on loan for the 2019–20 season. In February, he made his debut in the match against Admira Wacker Mödling.

=== Fortuna Düsseldorf ===
On 5 October 2020, Klarer moved into German football with Fortuna Düsseldorf, newly relegated from the Bundesliga, on a contract until 30 June 2024.

=== Darmstadt 98 ===
On 18 July 2023, Klarer signed a four-year contract with newly promoted Bundesliga club Darmstadt 98. Darmstadt were relegated again after one season.

=== Birmingham City ===
On 20 July 2024, a year after joining Darmstadt 98, Klarer returned to English football on a three-year contract with EFL League One club Birmingham City. He was an unused substitute for the opening match of the league season, and made an "extremely comfortable" debut in the starting eleven for the next fixture, a 1–0 away to Charlton Athletic on 13 August. His performances in Birmingham's 2024–25 promotion season earned him a place in the PFA League One Team of the Year. The club earned triple-digit points and Klarer was one of their seven members to be selected.

== Career statistics ==
As of 13 December 2025

Appearances and goals by club, season and competition
Club	Season	League			National cup (Note: Includes Austrian Cup, DFB-Pokal, FA Cup)		League cup (Note: Includes EFL Cup)		Europe		Other		Total	
Club	Season	Division	Apps	Goals	Apps	Goals	Apps	Goals	Apps	Goals	Apps	Goals	Apps	Goals
Southampton U21	2017–18	—			—		—		—		0	0	0	0
Southampton U21	2018–19	—			—		—		—		1 (Note: Appearances in EFL Trophy)	0	1	0
Southampton U21	2019–20	—			—		—		—		2	0	2	0
Southampton U21	Total		—		—		—		—		3	0	3	0
Southampton	2019–20	Premier League	0	0	0	0	0	0	—		—		0	0
St. Pölten (loan)	2019–20	Austrian Bundesliga	13	0	1	0	—		—		—		14	0
Fortuna Düsseldorf	2020–21	2. Bundesliga	13	0	1	0	—		—		—		14	0
Fortuna Düsseldorf	2021–22	2. Bundesliga	31	3	2	0	—		—		—		33	3
Fortuna Düsseldorf	2022–23	2. Bundesliga	30	2	3	0	—		—		—		33	2
Fortuna Düsseldorf	Total		74	5	6	0	—		—		—		80	5
Darmstadt	2023–24	Bundesliga	30	2	1	0	—		—		—		31	2
Birmingham City	2024–25	League One	43	1	3	0	2	0	—		6	1	54	2
Birmingham City	2025–26	Championship	43	3	2	0	1	0	—		—		46	3
Birmingham City	Total		64	3	3	0	3	0	—		6	1	100	5
Career total			181	10	11	0	3	0	0	0	9	1	204	11

== Honours ==
Birmingham City

- EFL League One: 2024–25
- EFL Trophy runner-up: 2024–25

Individual

- EFL League One Team of the Season: 2024–25
- PFA Team of the Year: 2024–25 League One
