= Rouwen Hennings =

German footballer (born 1987)

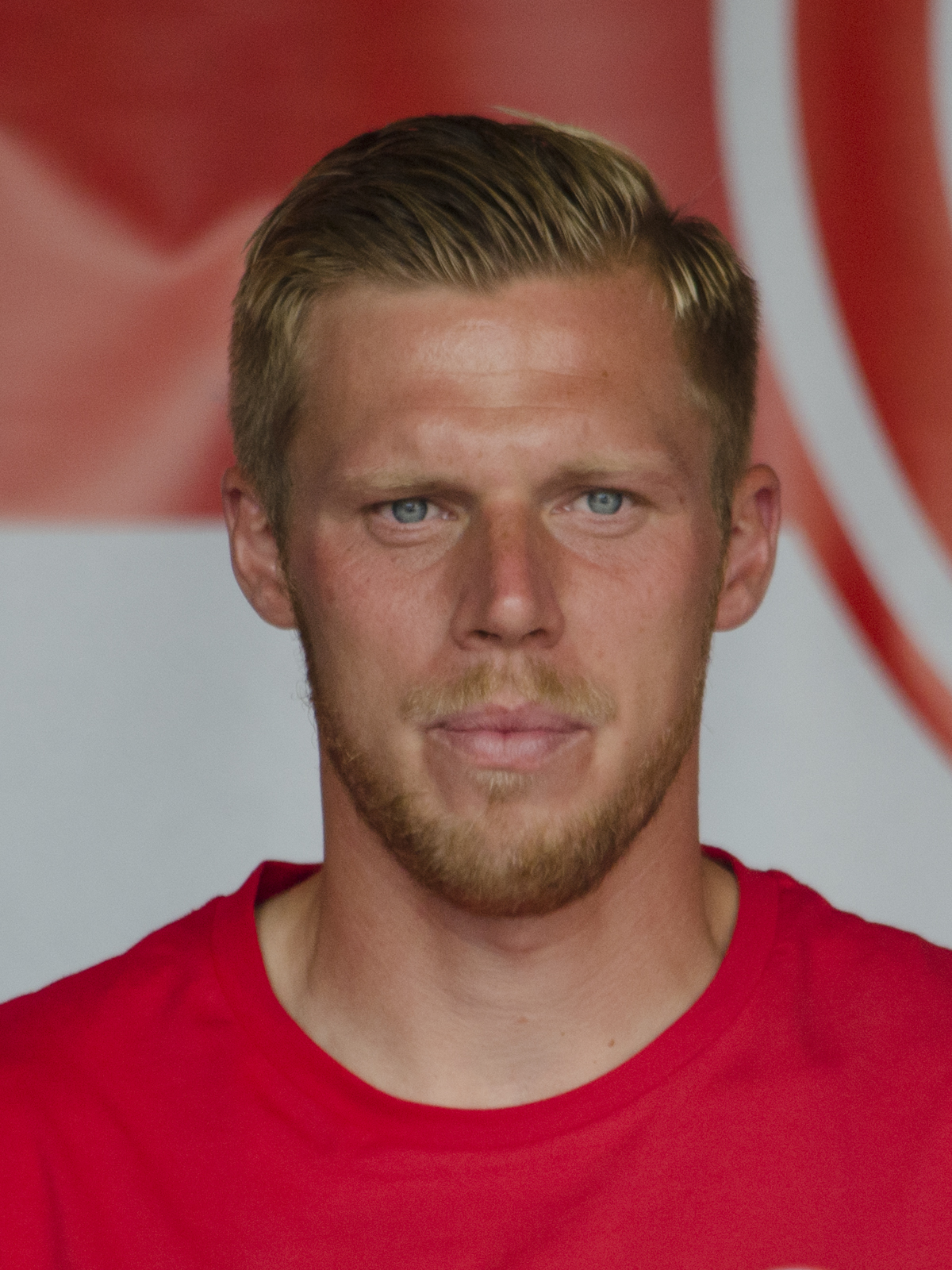
- Hennings with Fortuna Düsseldorf in 2019

Personal information
- Full name: Rouwen Hennings
- Date of birth: 28 August 1987 (age 39)
- Place of birth: Bad Oldesloe, West Germany
- Height: 1.80 m (5 ft 11 in)
- Position: Forward

Youth career
- –2001: VfL Oldesloe
- 2001–2005: Hamburger SV

Senior career*
Years	Team	Apps	(Gls)
2005–2007	Hamburger SV II	51	(11)
2006–2009	Hamburger SV	0	(0)
2007–2008	→ VfL Osnabrück (loan)	29	(2)
2008–2009	→ FC St. Pauli (loan)	21	(2)
2009–2012	FC St. Pauli	52	(10)
2011	FC St. Pauli II	3	(3)
2012	→ VfL Osnabrück (loan)	17	(5)
2012–2015	Karlsruher SC	95	(36)
2015–2016	Burnley	26	(1)
2016–2023	Fortuna Düsseldorf	213	(72)
2023–2024	SV Sandhausen	14	(6)

International career
2005–2006	Germany U19	5	(2)
2007	Germany U20	3	(2)
2007–2009	Germany U21	21	(13)
- * Club domestic league appearances and goals as of 10:30, 11 August 2025 (UTC)

Rouwen Hennings (born 28 August 1987) is a German professional footballer who plays as a forward.

Hennings has previously played for Hamburger SV, VfL Osnabrück, FC St. Pauli, and Karlsruher SC in the Bundesliga, 2. Bundesliga, and 3. Liga. He has played international football for Germany's under-19, under-20, and under-21 level, making 21 caps and scoring 13 goals for the latter.

== Club career ==
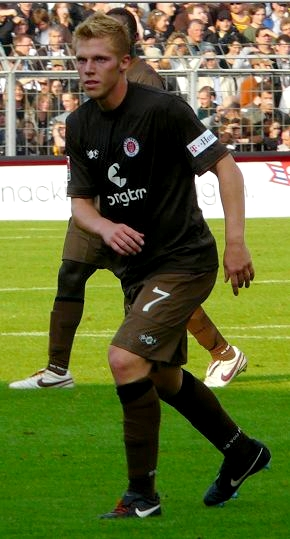
Hennings playing for FC St. Pauli in 2008

Hennings started his career with local junior side VfL Oldesloe before signing for Hamburger SV in 2001. He progressed through the junior sides to be promoted to the first team in 2005. He featured mainly for the second side in the Regionalliga Nord, making 22 appearances in the 2005–06 season and 29 appearances in the 2006–07 season, before joining 2. Bundesliga side VfL Osnabrück on a season-long loan in July 2007. He struggled to score goals for Osnabrück, only scoring 2 goals in 30 appearances as the club finished in mid-table. In the summer of 2008 he was again sent out on a season-long loan to 2. Bundesliga side FC St. Pauli. He again struggled for goals, only scoring twice in 21 appearances as the side finished in 8th position, however, St. Pauli made the move permanent at the end of the season in July 2009 for €200,000.

He spent three years at St. Pauli as a permanent player winning promotion to the Bundesliga in the 2009–10 season as the side finished runners-up in the 2. Bundesliga, with Hennings scoring 9 goals in 29 appearances. St. Pauli only lasted one season in the Bundesliga, finishing in last place and Hennings struggled to make an impact, only making 16 appearances. During the 2011–12 season back in the 2. Bundesliga, Hennings struggled to break into the first team, making only seven appearances, and in January 2012 he was sent out on loan to former club VfL Osnabrück in the 3. Liga. He found some goalscoring form at Osnabrück scoring five in seventeen.

In June 2012, he signed for 3. Liga side Karlsruher SC for €50,000 and won promotion to 2. Bundesliga in his first season with the club as they finished as champions. Karlsruher SC made a good return to the second division finishing in 5th place as Hennings scored 10 goals in 31 appearances. In his final season with the club he finished as top scorer in the league with 17 goals as Karlsruher SC narrowly missed out on automatic promotion and finished in third position, qualifying for the play-offs. Hennings went on to score once more in the 3–2 aggregate play-off defeat to his former club Hamburger SV. He made a total of 102 appearances for Karlsruher SC scoring 37 goals.

In the summer of 2015 he was in high demand across Europe, being linked with a move back for former club Hamburger SV and also to SV Werder Bremen, whilst there was also an offer from Greek side PAOK FC, where Frank Arnesen was sporting director. In July 2015, Football League Championship side Sheffield Wednesday had a bid rejected for Hennings, but in August 2015 fellow Championship side Burnley signed him on a three-year contract for an undisclosed fee. Hennings scored his first goal for the club in a 2–2 draw with Cardiff City on 28 November 2015.

Despite having made regular substitute appearances during Burnley's Championship-winning campaign in 2015–16, he did not feature in the Premier League the following season. Instead, he was loaned out for the duration of the 2016–17 season, returning to his homeland to play for Fortuna Düsseldorf. Hennings made 30 appearances and scored nine goals as the club finished 11th in the 2. Bundesliga. On 7 July 2017, it was announced that he had returned to Düsseldorf on a permanent basis after being granted a free transfer by Burnley.

At Fortuna Düsseldorf for the 2017–18 season, he played a key role in helping them gain promotion to the Bundesliga.

Hennings signed for SV Sandhausen for the 2023–24 season.

== International career ==
Hennings has represented Germany at under-19, under-20 and under-21 level. He first represented Germany at under-19 level in October 2005 whilst playing in the qualifiers for the 2006 UEFA European Under-19 Championship. He gained five caps at this level scoring twice in a 3–2 victory over Greece as Germany failed to qualify for the main tournament. Hennings also gained three caps at under-20 level in 2007, scoring in friendly international victories over Switzerland and Austria. He made his debut for the under-21 side in February 2007, replacing Marcel Heller as a substitute in the 0–0 draw with Italy. He featured heavily in the qualification for the 2009 UEFA European Under-21 Championship, finishing as joint top scorer in the qualifiers with seven goals. He scored braces against Israel and Luxembourg, and also scored against Northern Ireland and Moldova. Despite being top goalscorer, Hennings could not force himself into the squad for the final tournament and finished his under-21 career with 21 appearances and 13 goals.

== Career statistics ==
As of match played 4 July 2024

Appearances and goals by club, season and competition
Club	Season	League			Cup (Note: Appearances in DFB-Pokal and FA Cup)		Other		Total		Ref.
Club	Season	Division	Apps	Goals	Apps	Goals	Apps	Goals	Apps	Goals	Ref.
Hamburger SV II	2005–06	Regionalliga Nord	22	3	—		—		22	3	
Hamburger SV II	2006–07	Regionalliga Nord	29	8	—		—		29	8	
Hamburger SV II	Total		51	11	—		—		51	11	—
VfL Osnabrück (loan)	2007–08	2. Bundesliga	29	2	1	0	—		30	2	
FC St. Pauli (loan)	2008–09	2. Bundesliga	21	2	1	0	—		22	2	
FC St. Pauli	2009–10	2. Bundesliga	29	9	2	0	—		31	9	
FC St. Pauli	2010–11	Bundesliga	16	1	1	0	—		17	1	
FC St. Pauli	2011–12	2. Bundesliga	7	0	1	0	—		8	0	
FC St. Pauli	Total		73	12	5	0	—		78	12	—
FC St. Pauli II	2011–12	Regionalliga Nord	3	3	—		—		3	3	
VfL Osnabrück (loan)	2011–12	3. Liga	17	5	0	0	—		17	5	
Karlsruher SC	2012–13	3. Liga	35	9	3	0	—		38	9	
Karlsruher SC	2013–14	2. Bundesliga	31	10	—		—		31	10	
Karlsruher SC	2014–15	2. Bundesliga	27	17	1	0	2 (Note: Appearances in Bundesliga relegation playoff)	1	30	18	
Karlsruher SC	2015–16	2. Bundesliga	2	0	1	0	—		3	0	
Karlsruher SC	Total		95	36	5	0	2	1	102	37	—
Burnley	2015–16	Championship	26	1	2	1	—		28	2	
Fortuna Düsseldorf (loan)	2016–17	2. Bundesliga	30	9	0	0	—		30	9	
Fortuna Düsseldorf	2017–18	2. Bundesliga	33	13	2	2	—		35	15	
Fortuna Düsseldorf	2018–19	Bundesliga	29	7	3	2	—		32	9	
Fortuna Düsseldorf	2019–20	Bundesliga	32	15	4	4	—		36	19	
Fortuna Düsseldorf	2020–21	2. Bundesliga	33	9	2	2	0	0	35	11	
Fortuna Düsseldorf	2021–22	2. Bundesliga	30	13	2	2	—		32	15	
Fortuna Düsseldorf	2022–23	2. Bundesliga	26	6	3	0	—		29	6	
Fortuna Düsseldorf	Total		213	73	16	12	0	0	229	85	—
SV Sandhausen	2023–24	3. Liga	14	6	2	1	—		16	7	
Career total			521	148	31	14	2	1	554	163	—

== Honours ==
FC St. Pauli

- 2. Bundesliga runner-up: 2009–10

Karlsruher SC

- 3. Liga: 2012–13

Burnley

- Football League Championship: 2015–16

Fortuna Düsseldorf

- 2. Bundesliga: 2017–18

Individual

- 2. Bundesliga top goalscorer: 2014–15
