= Florian Kastenmeier =

German footballer

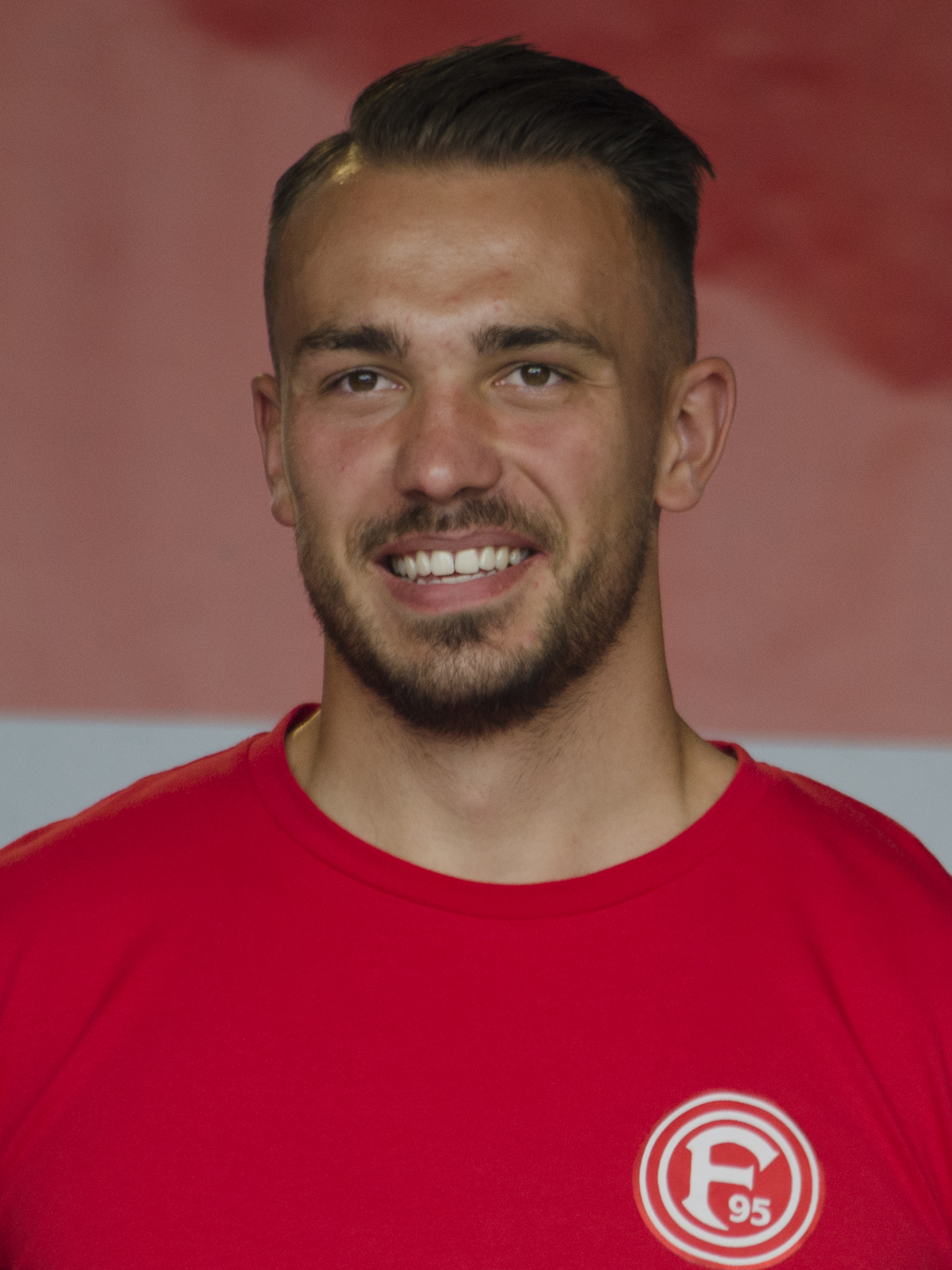

Personal information
- Date of birth: 28 June 1997 (age 29)
- Place of birth: Regensburg, Germany
- Height: 1.92 m (6 ft 4 in)
- Position: Goalkeeper

Team information
- Current team: Feyenoord
- Number: 33

Youth career
- –2006: SC Sinzing
- 2006–2012: Jahn Regensburg
- 2012–2013: SV Burgweinting
- 2013–2015: FC Augsburg

Senior career*
Years	Team	Apps	(Gls)
2015–2017	FC Augsburg II	28	(0)
2017–2019	VfB Stuttgart II	57	(0)
2019–2026	Fortuna Düsseldorf	211	(0)
2026–	Feyenoord	0	(0)

International career
2014	Germany U18	1	(0)
- * Club domestic league appearances and goals as of 1 September 2026

Florian Kastenmeier (born 28 June 1997) is a German professional footballer who plays as a goalkeeper for Eredivisie club Feyenoord.

== Club career ==
=== Early career ===
Kastenmeier is from Regensburg and grew up as a Jahn Regensburg supporter, also working as a ballboy for the club. He joined Jahn Regensburg's academy in 2006, having previously played youth football with SC Sinzing. He played youth football with SV Burgweinting and FC Augsburg before in the 2015–16 season, moving to Augsburg's reserve team. He made 6 appearances in the 2015–16 season and 22 appearances in 2016–17.

In February 2017, it was announced that Kastenmeier had agreed to sign for VfB Stuttgart II from summer 2017. He played 57 times across two seasons for the team.

=== Fortuna Düsseldorf ===
In May 2019, it was announced that Kastenmeier had signed for Fortuna Düsseldorf on a contract until 2022. Kastenmeier made his professional debut with Fortuna Düsseldorf in a 2–1 DFB-Pokal win over Erzgebirge Aue on 30 October 2019. An injury to first-choice goalkeeper Zack Steffen allowed Kastenmeier to make his Bundesliga debut against Werder Bremen on 18 January 2020, though Kastenmeier scored an own goal as Fortuna lost 1–0. Kastenmeier retained his place in the first team nonetheless, starting every remaining Bundesliga game for Fortuna in the 2019–20 season, though Fortuna Düsseldorf would be relegated after finishing 17th.

In September 2020, manager Uwe Rösler confirmed that Kastenmeier would retain his status of first-choice goalkeeper for the upcoming season. On 28 January 2021, it was announced that Kastenmeier had extended his contract with Fortuna until summer 2024. Kastenmeier made 33 league starts across the 2020–21 season.

In August 2023, Kastenmeier's contract with Fortuna Düsseldorf was extended until summer 2026.

=== Feyenoord ===
In September 2026, Kastenmeier signed a 1+1 year deal with Dutch side Feyenoord.

== International career ==
Kastenmeier made one appearance for the Germany national under-18 team in a 3–2 win over the United States in December 2014.

== Style of play ==
Kastenmeier is 1.92 metres tall. He played as a striker until he signed for Augsburg, being noted for his aerial ability. He has been praised for his play in possession, with Kastenmeier suggesting this comes from his experience playing outfield, and he has been noted for the quality of his long balls in particular. Whilst initially unimpressive for Fortuna Düsseldorf in shot-stopping and one-on-one defending, he was later praised for his ability and development in these areas.

== Personal life ==
Kastenmeier has a daughter, Mila, born in April 2020.

== Career statistics ==
As of match played 17 May 2026

Appearances and goals by club, season and competition
Club	Season	League			National cup		Other		Total	
Club	Season	Division	Apps	Goals	Apps	Goals	Apps	Goals	Apps	Goals
FC Augsburg II	2015–16	Regionalliga Bayern	6	0	—		—		6	0
FC Augsburg II	2016–17	Regionalliga Bayern	22	0	—		—		22	0
FC Augsburg II	Total		28	0	—		—		28	0
VfB Stuttgart II	2017–18	Regionalliga Südwest	26	0	—		—		26	0
VfB Stuttgart II	2018–19	Regionalliga Südwest	31	0	—		—		31	0
VfB Stuttgart II	Total		57	0	—		—		57	0
Fortuna Düsseldorf	2019–20	Bundesliga	17	0	3	0	—		20	0
Fortuna Düsseldorf	2020–21	2. Bundesliga	33	0	1	0	—		34	0
Fortuna Düsseldorf	2021–22	2. Bundesliga	28	0	2	0	—		30	0
Fortuna Düsseldorf	2022–23	2. Bundesliga	34	0	3	0	—		37	0
Fortuna Düsseldorf	2023–24	2. Bundesliga	33	0	3	0	2	0	38	0
Fortuna Düsseldorf	2024–25	2. Bundesliga	34	0	1	0	—		35	0
Fortuna Düsseldorf	2025–26	2. Bundesliga	32	0	2	0	—		34	0
Fortuna Düsseldorf	Total		211	0	15	0	2	0	228	0
Feyenoord	2026–27	Eredivisie	0	0	0	0	0	0	0	0
Career total			296	0	15	0	2	0	313	0
