= Marcel Sobottka =

German footballer

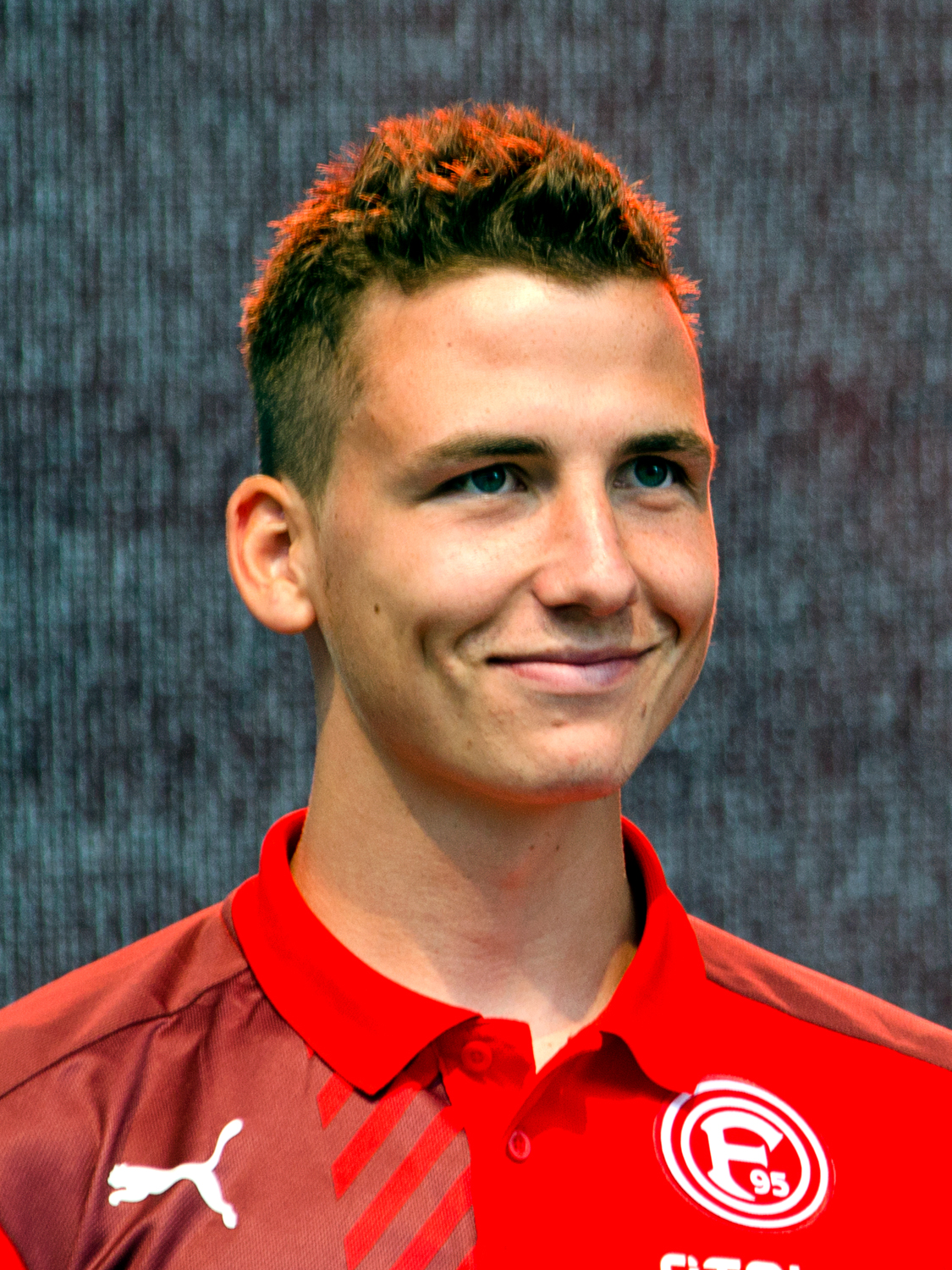
- Sobottka with Fortuna Düsseldorf in 2015

Personal information
- Date of birth: 25 April 1994 (age 32)
- Place of birth: Gelsenkirchen, Germany
- Height: 1.85 m (6 ft 1 in)
- Positions: Defender; defensive midfielder

Youth career
- –2013: Schalke 04

Senior career*
Years	Team	Apps	(Gls)
2013–2015	Schalke 04 II	41	(1)
2015	Fortuna Düsseldorf II	7	(0)
2015–2025	Fortuna Düsseldorf	210	(14)
2024	Fortuna Düsseldorf II	1	(0)
2026	VfL Bochum	2	(0)

International career
2013	Germany U20	1	(0)
- * Club domestic league appearances and goals as of 15 February 2026

Marcel Sobottka (born 25 April 1994) is a German professional footballer who plays as a defender or defensive midfielder.

== Club career ==
Sobottka joined Fortuna Düsseldorf in 2015 from Schalke 04. He made his 2. Bundesliga debut on 22 August 2015 against SC Freiburg in a 2–1 home defeat replacing Julian Koch after 45 minutes.

In June 2017, he agreed to new five-year contract until 2022.

On 15 January 2026, Sobottka signed a contract with VfL Bochum in 2. Bundesliga until the end of the 2025–26 season.

== International career ==
Sobottka played one cap for the Germany U20 national team in a friendly against the Poland U20.

== Career statistics ==
As of 15 February 2026

Appearances and goals by club, season and competition
Club	Season	League			DFB-Pokal		Other		Total	
Club	Season	Division	Apps	Goals	Apps	Goals	Apps	Goals	Apps	Goals
Schalke 04 II	2013–14	Regionalliga West	27	0	—		—		27	0
Schalke 04 II	2014–15	Regionalliga West	14	1	—		—		14	1
Schalke 04 II	Total		41	1	—		—		41	1
Fortuna Düsseldorf	2015–16	2. Bundesliga	15	0	1	0	—		16	0
Fortuna Düsseldorf	2016–17	2. Bundesliga	28	3	2	2	—		30	5
Fortuna Düsseldorf	2017–18	2. Bundesliga	32	4	2	0	—		34	4
Fortuna Düsseldorf	2018–19	Bundesliga	14	0	1	0	—		15	0
Fortuna Düsseldorf	2019–20	Bundesliga	18	0	3	0	—		21	0
Fortuna Düsseldorf	2020–21	2. Bundesliga	32	5	2	0	—		34	5
Fortuna Düsseldorf	2021–22	2. Bundesliga	23	0	1	0	—		24	0
Fortuna Düsseldorf	2022–23	2. Bundesliga	25	2	3	0	—		28	2
Fortuna Düsseldorf	2023–24	2. Bundesliga	13	0	3	0	2	0	18	0
Fortuna Düsseldorf	2024–25	2. Bundesliga	10	0	1	0	—		11	0
Fortuna Düsseldorf	Total		210	14	19	2	2	0	231	16
Fortuna Düsseldorf II	2015–16	Regionalliga West	7	0	—		—		7	0
VfL Bochum	2025–26	2. Bundesliga	2	0	—		—		2	0
Career total			260	15	19	2	2	0	281	17
