= Dawid Kownacki =

Polish footballer (born 1997)

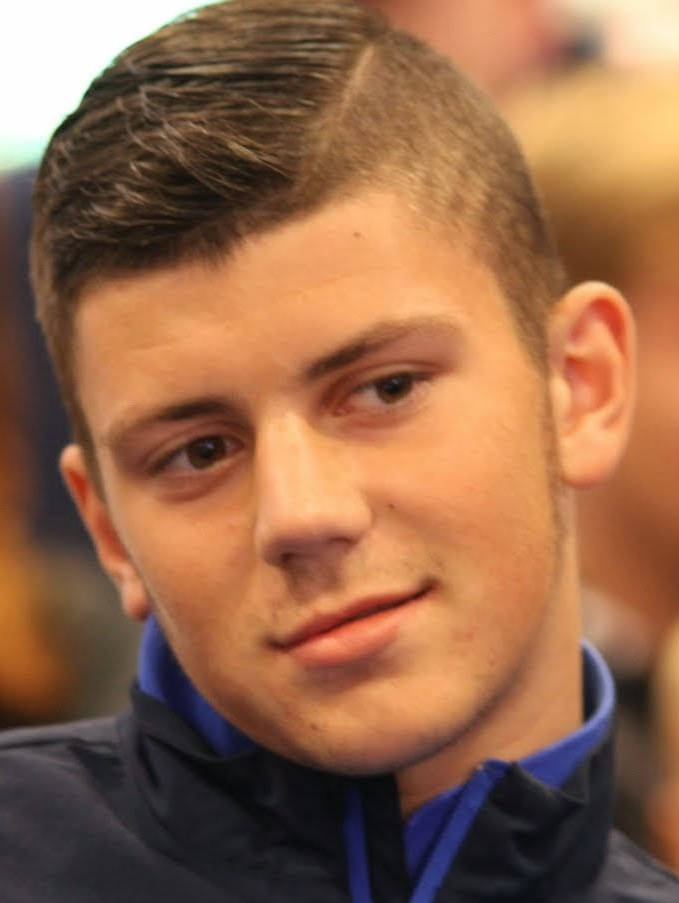
- Kownacki in 2014

Personal information
- Full name: Dawid Igor Kownacki
- Date of birth: 14 March 1997 (age 29)
- Place of birth: Gorzów Wielkopolski, Poland
- Height: 1.85 m (6 ft 1 in)
- Position: Forward

Youth career
- GKP Gorzów Wielkopolski
- 2005–2013: Lech Poznań

Senior career*
Years	Team	Apps	(Gls)
2013–2016	Lech Poznań II	8	(5)
2013–2017	Lech Poznań	94	(21)
2017–2020	Sampdoria	35	(6)
2019–2020	→ Fortuna Düsseldorf (loan)	25	(4)
2020–2023	Fortuna Düsseldorf	71	(21)
2021–2022	→ Lech Poznań (loan)	14	(4)
2023–2026	Werder Bremen	22	(0)
2024–2025	→ Fortuna Düsseldorf (loan)	29	(13)
2025–2026	→ Hertha BSC (loan)	21	(5)

International career
2011	Poland U15	4	(7)
2012	Poland U16	2	(1)
2012–2014	Poland U17	10	(8)
2014–2016	Poland U19	4	(0)
2015–2019	Poland U21	23	(15)
2018–2021	Poland	7	(1)
- * Club domestic league appearances and goals as of 1 July 2026

Dawid Igor Kownacki (['david kɔvˈnat͡ski]; born 14 March 1997) is a Polish professional footballer who plays as a forward. Besides Poland, he has played in Italy and Germany.

== Club career ==
=== Lech Poznań ===
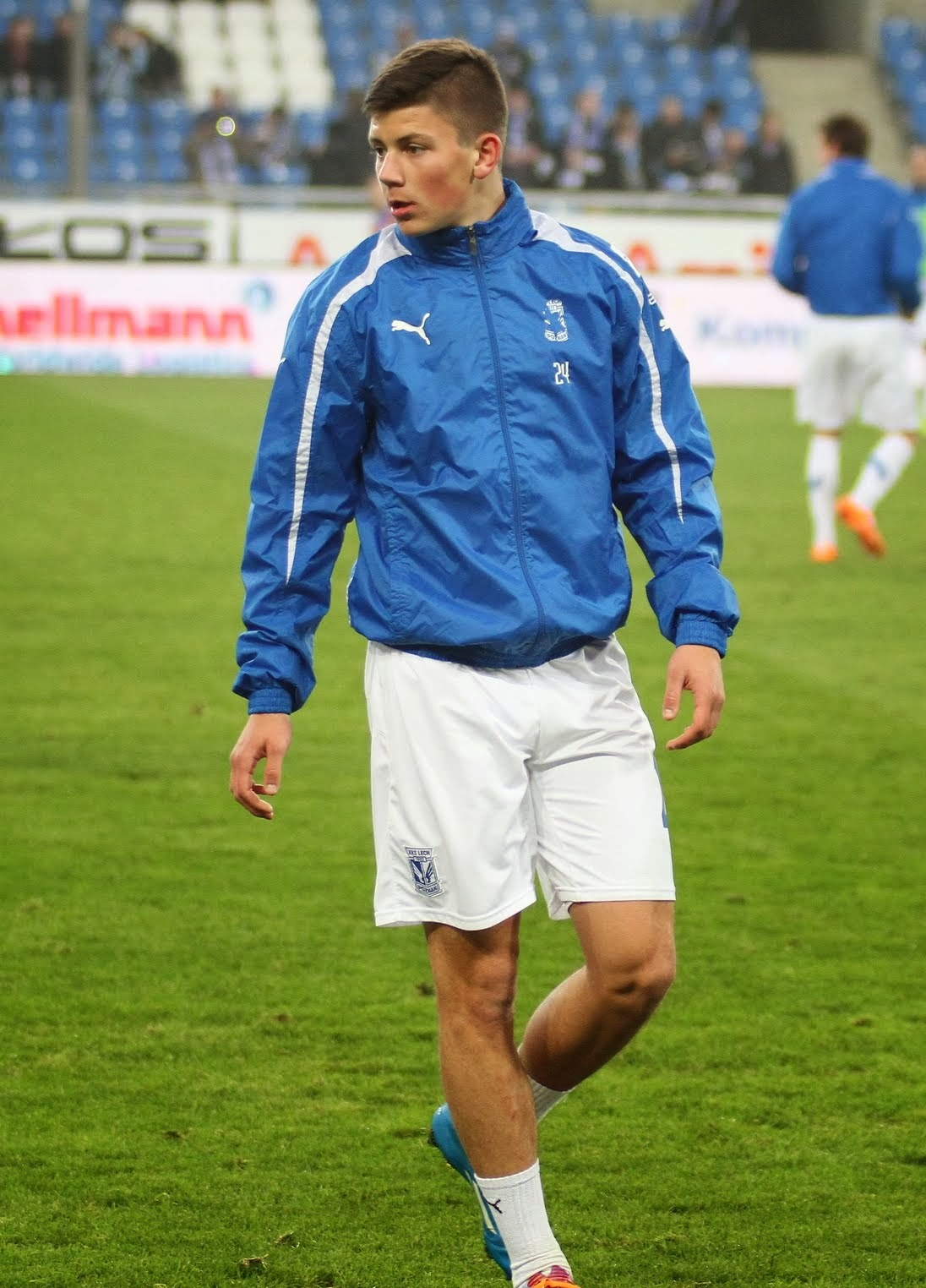
Kownacki during training with Lech Poznań

Having started out at local side GKP Gorzów Wielkopolski, Kownacki joined Lech Poznań in 2005, coming through the youth ranks and making it to the first team in December 2013. He scored his first Ekstraklasa goal in February 2014 in a 5–1 loss at Pogoń Szczecin, becoming one of only five players aged under 17 to have registered in Poland's top flight. He won his first league title the following season. In 2017 he commented: "At 16, people were calling me 'the new Lewandowski' which was tough to handle, but I changed my attitude, grew up and am now much better at not taking to heart what people say. Of course, I still have big dreams".

=== Sampdoria ===
On 11 July 2017, Kownacki signed a five-year contract with Italian side Sampdoria.

In November, he scored a brace and assisted another goal in Sampdoria's 4–1 Coppa Italia win against Delfino Pescara in the fourth round.

=== Fortuna Düsseldorf and loan to Lech Poznań ===
On 31 January 2019, Kownacki joined Bundesliga club Fortuna Düsseldorf on loan with an option to buy. On 30 June 2019, he rejoined Fortuna on another loan with an obligation to buy, which was fulfilled in January 2020.

On 2 February 2022, Kownacki returned to Lech Poznań on loan until the end of the season.

=== Werder Bremen ===
On 22 May 2023, Bundesliga club Werder Bremen announced the signing of Kownacki on a free transfer from Fortuna for the 2023–24 season.

He re-joined former club Fortuna Düsseldorf of the 2. Bundesliga for the 2024–25 season. Düsseldorf secured an option to sign him permanently.

On 21 July 2025, Kownacki returned to 2. Bundesliga on another loan, joining Hertha BSC.

On 30 September 2026, Kownacki and Werder agreed to terminate his contract by mutual consent.

== International career ==
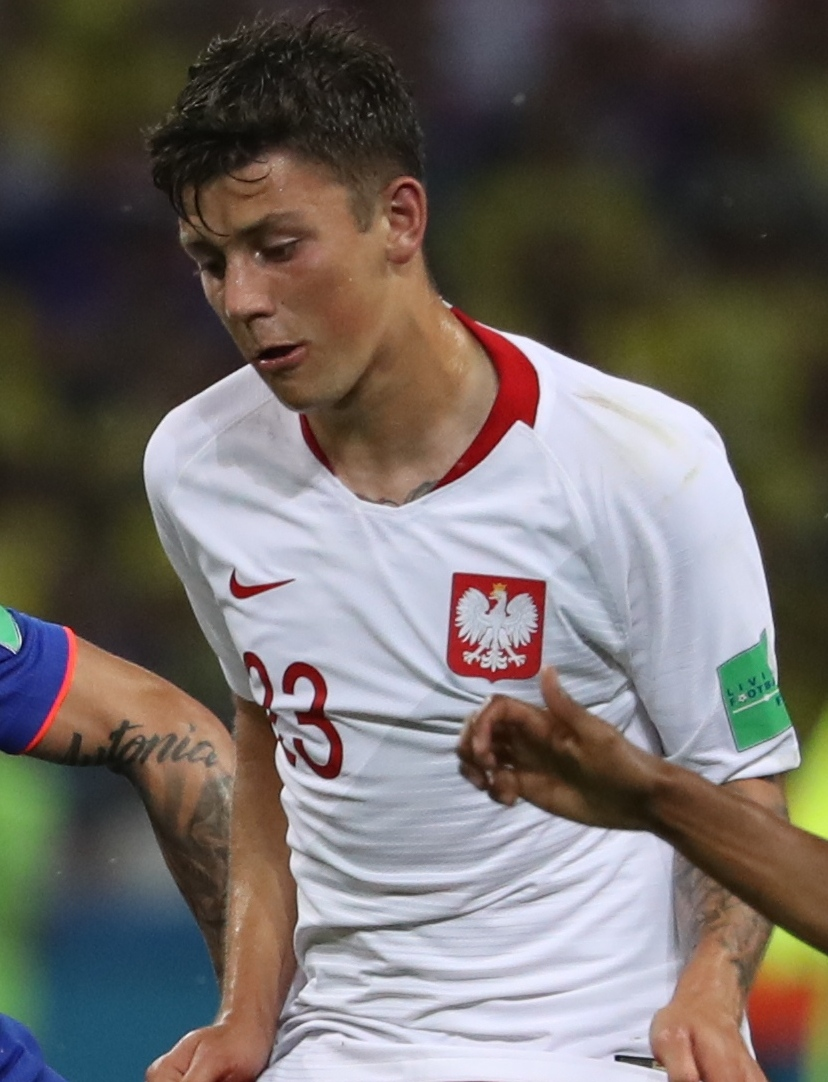
Kownacki with Poland at the 2018 FIFA World Cup

Kownacki represented Poland at various youth levels ranging from U16 until U21, earning 46 appearances and scoring 31 goals. He received his first call-up to the senior squad for matches against Georgia and Greece in June 2015. On 23 March 2018, Kownacki debuted in a friendly match against Nigeria, playing 72 minutes.

Kownacki was named in Poland's 23-man squad for the 2018 FIFA World Cup in Russia, and was considered back-up to Robert Lewandowski.

== Career statistics ==
=== Club ===
As of match played 1 July 2026

Appearances and goals by club, season and competition
Club	Season	League			National cup (Note: Includes Polish Cup, Coppa Italia, DFB-Pokal)		Europe		Other		Total	
Club	Season	Division	Apps	Goals	Apps	Goals	Apps	Goals	Apps	Goals	Apps	Goals
Lech Poznań II	2013–14	III liga, gr. C	6	3	—		—		—		6	3
Lech Poznań II	2014–15	III liga, gr. C	1	1	—		—		—		1	1
Lech Poznań II	2016–17	III liga, gr. II	1	1	—		—		—		1	1
Lech Poznań II	Total		8	5	—		—		—		8	5
Lech Poznań	2013–14	Ekstraklasa	13	2	—		—		—		13	2
Lech Poznań	2014–15	Ekstraklasa	30	4	5	2	3 (Note: Appearances in UEFA Europa League)	1	—		38	7
Lech Poznań	2015–16	Ekstraklasa	24	6	4	0	5 (Note: One appearance in UEFA Champions League, four appearances and one goal in UEFA Europa League)	1	1 (Note: Appearance in Polish Super Cup)	0	34	7
Lech Poznań	2016–17	Ekstraklasa	27	9	5	2	—		0	0	32	11
Lech Poznań	Total		94	21	14	4	8	2	1	0	117	27
Sampdoria	2017–18	Serie A	22	5	2	3	—		—		24	8
Sampdoria	2018–19	Serie A	13	1	3	1	—		—		16	2
Sampdoria	Total		35	6	5	4	—		—		40	10
Fortuna Düsseldorf	2018–19	Bundesliga	10	4	1	0	—		–		11	4
Fortuna Düsseldorf	2019–20	Bundesliga	20	0	1	0	—		—		21	0
Fortuna Düsseldorf	2020–21	2. Bundesliga	27	7	—		—		—		27	7
Fortuna Düsseldorf	2021–22	2. Bundesliga	7	0	1	1	—		—		8	1
Fortuna Düsseldorf	2022–23	2. Bundesliga	32	14	3	2	—		—		35	16
Fortuna Düsseldorf	Total		96	25	6	3	—		—		102	28
Lech Poznań (loan)	2021–22	Ekstraklasa	14	4	3	1	—		—		17	5
Werder Bremen	2023–24	Bundesliga	22	0	0	0	—		–		22	0
Werder Bremen	2026–27	Bundesliga	0	0	0	0	—		–		0	0
Werder Bremen	Total		22	0	0	0	—		—		22	0
Fortuna Düsseldorf (loan)	2024–25	2. Bundesliga	29	13	0	0	—		—		29	13
Hertha BSC (loan)	2025–26	2. Bundesliga	21	5	3	1	—		—		24	6
Career total			319	79	31	13	8	2	1	0	359	94

=== International ===
Appearances and goals by national team and year
National team	Year	Apps	Goals
Poland	2018	4	1
Poland	2019	2	0
Poland	2021	1	0
Total		7	1

Scores and results list Poland's goal tally first, score column indicates score after each Kownacki goal.

List of international goals scored by Dawid Kownacki
No.	Date	Venue	Opponent	Score	Result	Competition
1	12 June 2018	Stadion Narodowy, Warsaw, Poland	Lithuania	3–0	4–0	Friendly

== Honours ==
Lech Poznań

- Ekstraklasa: 2014–15, 2021–22
- Polish Super Cup: 2015

Individual

- Ekstraklasa Player of the Month: February 2017
