= Paul-Janes-Stadion =

Association football stadium in Düsseldorf, Germany

Coordinates: 51°13′30″N 6°49′38″E

- Flinger Broich
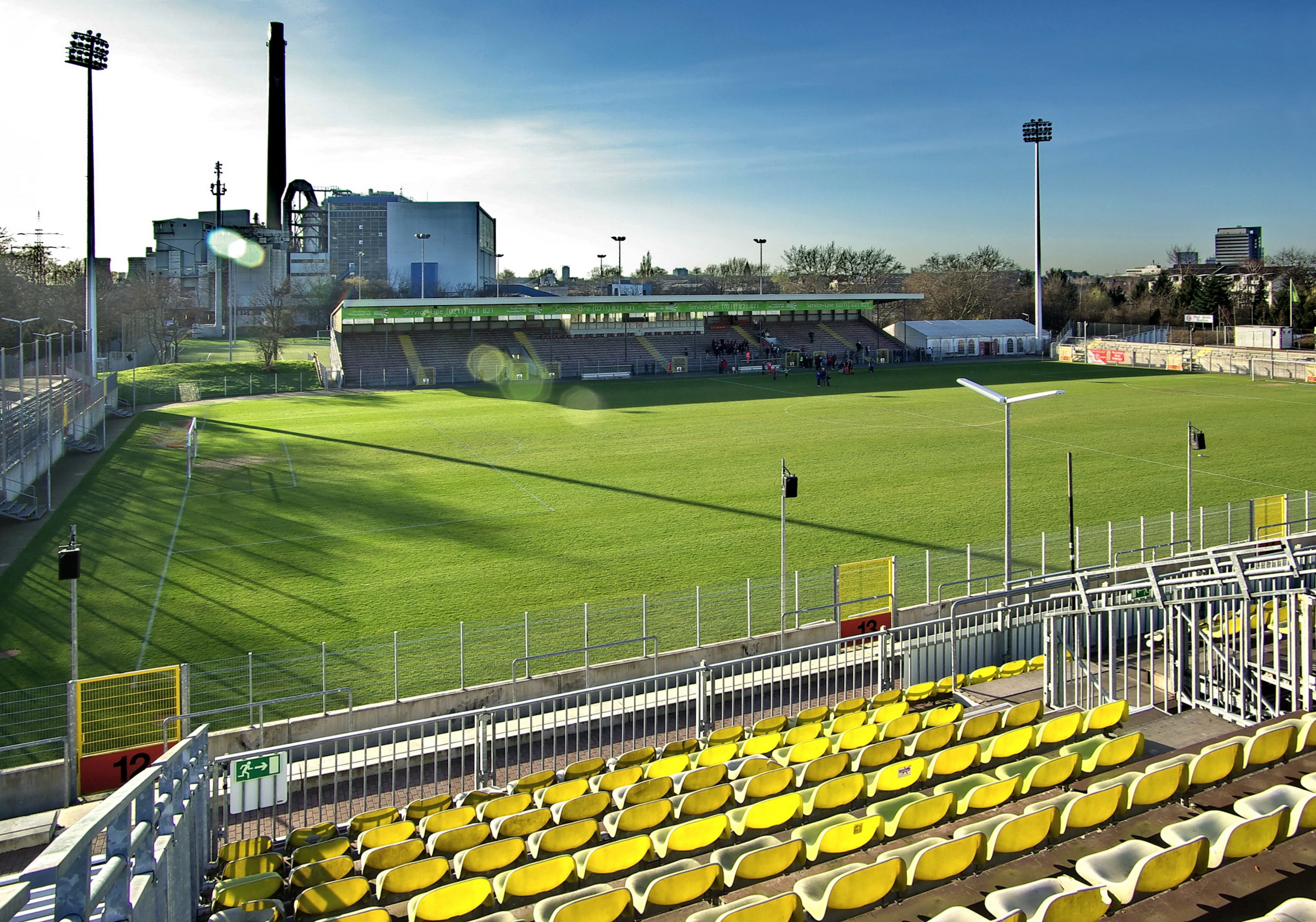
- Paul-Janes-Stadion in 2007
- Interactive map of Paul-Janes-Stadion
- Former names: Flinger Broich, Fortunaplatz
- Location: Düsseldorf, Germany
- Owner: City of Düsseldorf
- Capacity: 7,200
- Surface: Grass

Construction
- Opened: 1930
- Renovated: 1970, 2002

Tenant
- Fortuna Düsseldorf

The Paul-Janes-Stadion in Düsseldorf-Flingern is one of the home grounds of Fortuna Düsseldorf (1930–1972, early 2002-2005). It is located at 87 Flinger Broich, to the east of the city centre in the Nord Flingern district.

The stadium was built in 1930 by the team; now city-owned, it has been named since 1990 after the long-standing Düsseldorf and national football player Paul Janes. Before 1990 was it called "Flinger Broich" or "Fortunaplatz".

After World War II, the British army took over the stadium. A storm in 1958 destroyed the corrugated iron roof. In 1967 Fortuna Düsseldorf's clubhouse was built on the grounds.

While the Rheinstadion was under renovation in the 1970s, the Paul-Janes-Stadion was a Bundesliga ground, and appropriate floodlighting was therefore installed.

In 2001–02, the stadium was further renovated, to provide Fortuna with a satisfactory ground after the demolition of the Rheinstadion. New terraces were built and the grandstand was renovated. The renovations, financed by the City of Düsseldorf, cost €5 million. After the completion of the LTU Arena (now Esprit Arena), Fortuna Düsseldorf continued to play up to three home matches a year in Paul-Janes-Stadion, playing the remainder in the modern arena, until the 2007/2008 season, since when no further league matches have been played by the first eleven in the older stadium; it is now used exclusively for test, friendly, and cup matches and for all matches of the second eleven (Fortuna Düsseldorf II) and youth affiliate matches.

During the 2006 FIFA World Cup, the stadium was the venue for the biggest "Public Viewing" showing in a non-World Cup city in Germany. In addition to 12,600 seats for the fans in the stadium, there was a promenade around the stadium and an entertainment programme, particularly for children.

== Capacity ==
- 7,200 spectators
- Seats: 2,280 (roofed)
- Standing room Home: 3,550 (unroofed)
- Standing room Guests: 1,370 (unroofed)
- Record attendance: 36,000 (1950, against FC Schalke 04; 2:3)
