= Matthias Zimmermann (footballer, born 1992) =

German footballer

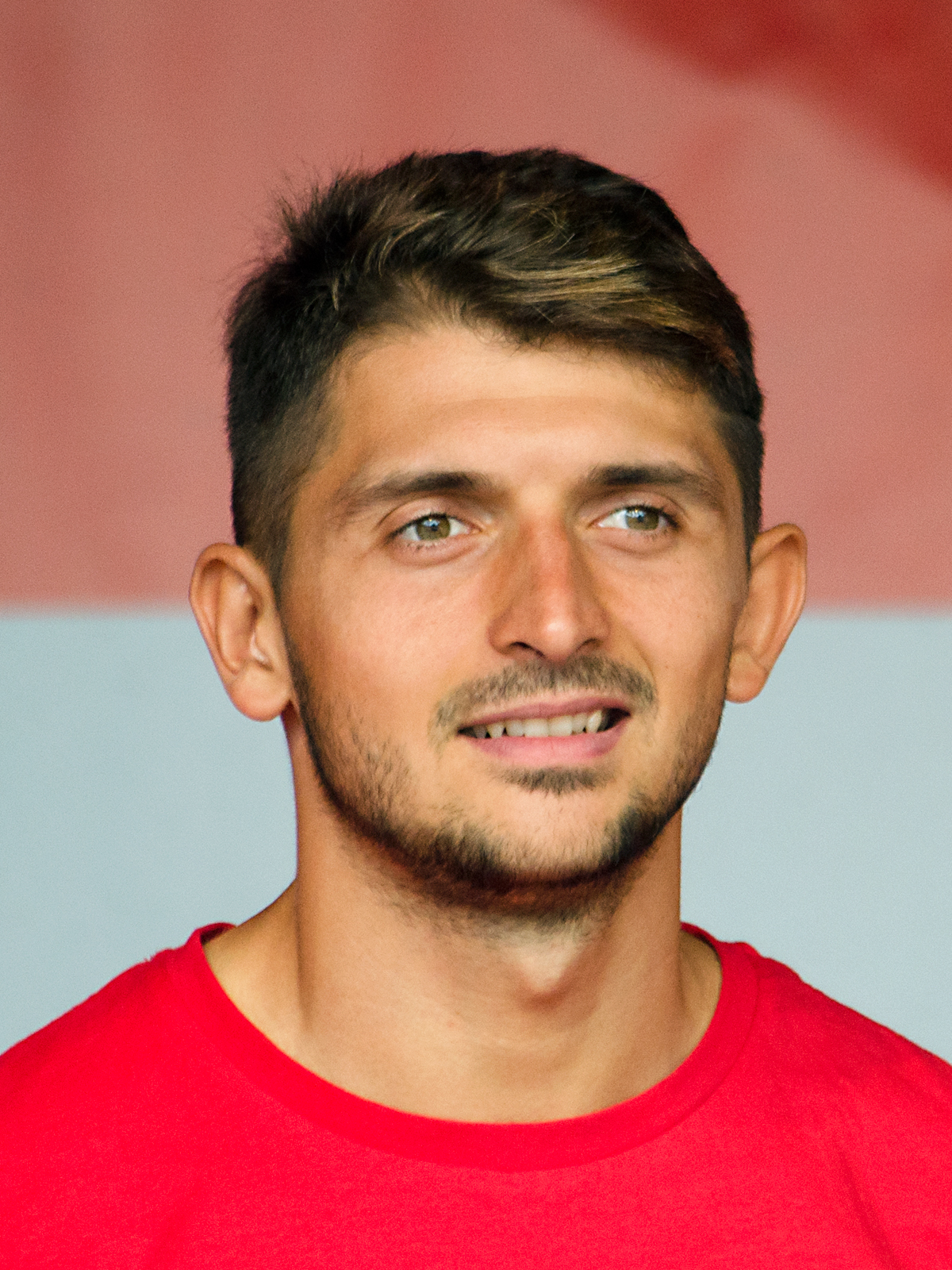
- Zimmermann in 2019

Personal information
- Full name: Matthias Jürgen Zimmermann
- Date of birth: 16 June 1992 (age 34)
- Place of birth: Pforzheim, Germany
- Height: 1.77 m (5 ft 10 in)
- Position: Defender

Team information
- Current team: Fortuna Düsseldorf
- Number: 25

Youth career
- VfB Grötzingen
- 2002–2009: Karlsruher SC

Senior career*
Years	Team	Apps	(Gls)
2009–2010	Karlsruher SC II	10	(1)
2009–2011	Karlsruher SC	50	(1)
2011–2015	Borussia Mönchengladbach II	63	(5)
2011–2015	Borussia Mönchengladbach	1	(0)
2013	→ Greuther Fürth (loan)	15	(1)
2013–2014	→ SV Sandhausen (loan)	19	(0)
2015–2018	VfB Stuttgart II	38	(1)
2016–2018	VfB Stuttgart	32	(1)
2018–	Fortuna Düsseldorf	234	(14)

International career^{‡}
2007–2008	Germany U15	2	(1)
2008	Germany U16	7	(0)
2008–2009	Germany U17	19	(0)
2009–2010	Germany U18	2	(0)
2010–2011	Germany U19	12	(0)
2011–2013	Germany U20	4	(0)
- * Club domestic league appearances and goals as of 18 May 2026 ‡ National team caps and goals as of 09:54, 11 September 2018 (UTC)

Matthias Jürgen Zimmermann (German pronunciation: [maˈtiːas ˈtsɪmɐman]; born 16 June 1992) is a German professional footballer who plays as a defender for Fortuna Düsseldorf.

== Career ==
Zimmermann started his footballing career in VfB Grötzingen's youth categories. In 2008, he moved to Karlsruher SC. He made his debut for Karlsruhe on 6 December 2009, in a 3–1 away victory against Rot Weiss Ahlen, after coming off the bench to replace Lars Stindl in the 90th minute.

On 18 June 2011, Zimmermann joined Borussia Mönchengladbach, signing a three-year contract with the new club, lasting until 2014. In January 2013, Zimmermann was loaned to SpVgg Greuther Fürth.

=== SV Sandhausen ===
On 27 June 2013, he signed a season long loan deal with SV Sandhausen.

=== VfB Stuttgart ===
For the 2015–16 season Zimmermann moved to VfB Stuttgart II. On 2 May 2016, he made his debut for the first team of VfB Stuttgart against Werder Bremen. Zimmermann extended his contract with the Bundesliga team of Stuttgart on 20 December 2017 until June 2019.

=== Fortuna Düsseldorf ===
On 16 July 2018, it was announced that Zimmermann would join Fortuna Düsseldorf on a two-year contract.
