= Krutscheider Bach =

River in Germany

Location
- Country: Germany
- States: North Rhine-Westphalia

Physical characteristics
- Mouth
  - location: Kleine Düssel
  - coordinates: 51.2201°N 7.0235°E

Basin features
- Progression: Kleine Düssel→ Düssel→ Rhine→ North Sea

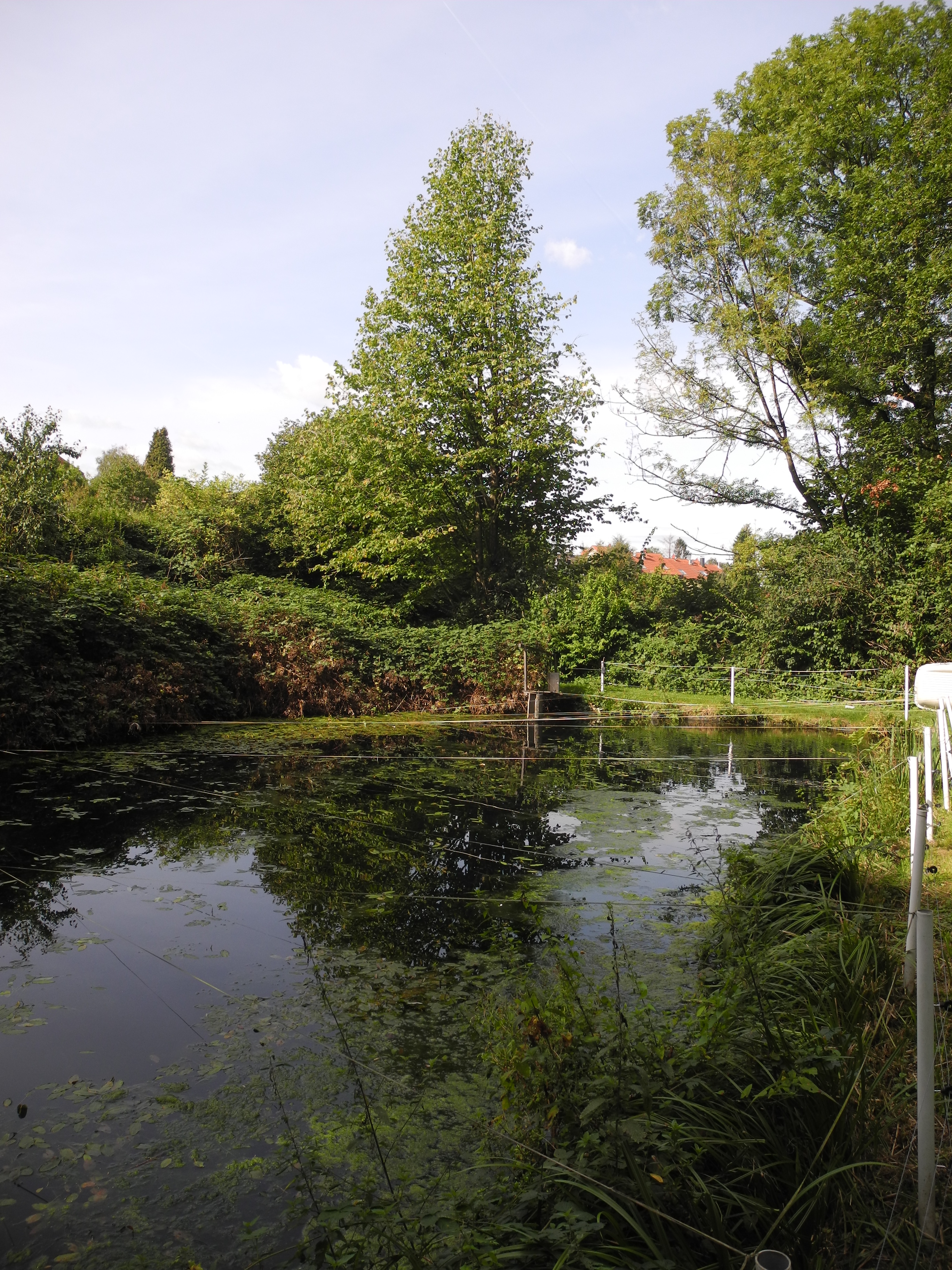

Krutscheider Bach is a small river of North Rhine-Westphalia, Germany. It is 4 km long and flows into the Kleine Düssel as a right tributary near Gruiten.

== See also ==
- List of rivers of North Rhine-Westphalia
