= Golden Bridge =

Golden Bridge may also refer to:

- Golden Bridge (India) (Narmada Bridge) is a bridge in India
- Golden Bridge (Germany) (Goldene Brücke), heritage-protected pedestrian bridge in Düsseldorf (Hofgarten)
- Golden Bridge (Vietnam) (Cầu Vàng), pedestrian bridge near Da Nang, Vietnam
- Golden Bridge (Russia) (Zolotoy Bridge), traffic bridge in Vladivostok, Russia
- The Golden Bridge (German: Die goldene Brücke), West German drama film

== See also ==
- Goldenbridge (disambiguation)
- Golden Gate Bridge
- Goldens Bridge, New York

- Goldens Bridge station

- Gold Bridge, an unincorporated community in Bridge River Country, British Columbia, Canada
