= Kleine Düssel =

River in Germany

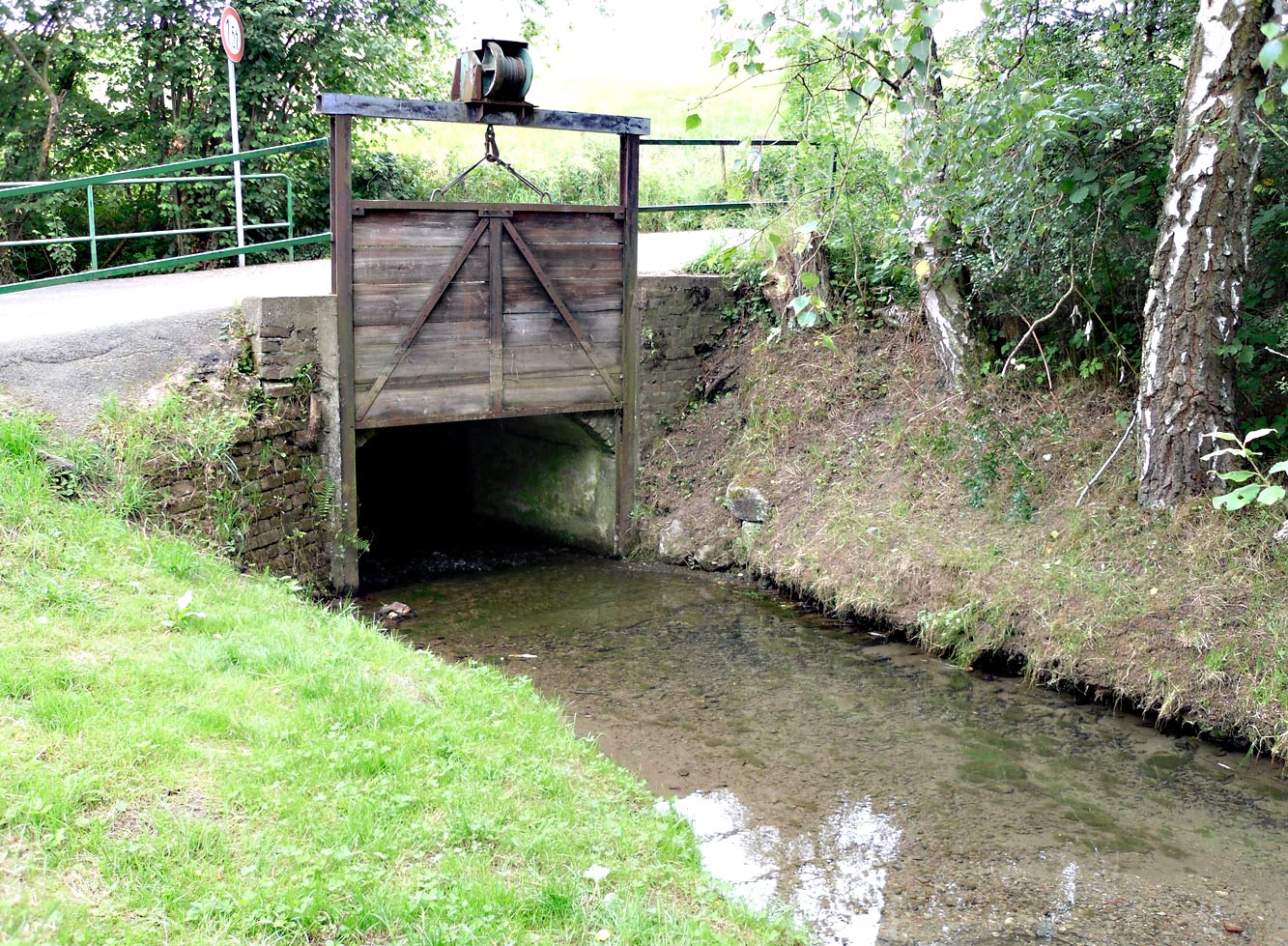

Location
- Country: Germany
- States: North Rhine-Westphalia

Physical characteristics
- Mouth
  - location: Düssel
  - coordinates: 51.2268°N 7.0090°E

Basin features
- Progression: Düssel→ Rhine→ North Sea

Kleine Düssel is a small river of North Rhine-Westphalia, Germany. It is 4.8 km long and flows into the Düssel as a left tributary near Gruiten.

== See also ==
- List of rivers of North Rhine-Westphalia
