= Jonas Carls =

German footballer

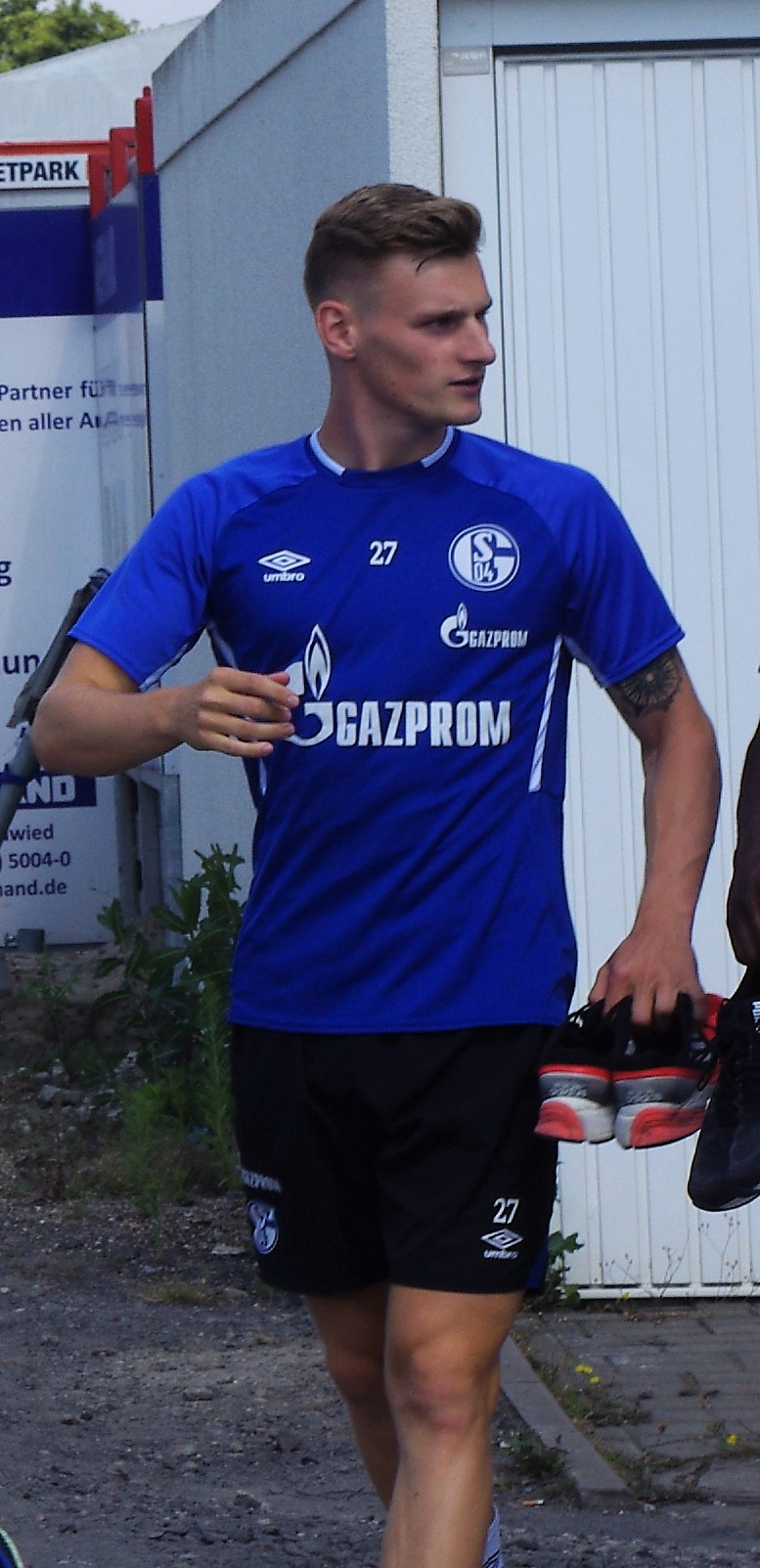
- Carls with Schalke 04 in 2019

Personal information
- Date of birth: 25 March 1997 (age 29)
- Place of birth: Haan, Germany
- Height: 1.79 m (5 ft 10 in)
- Position: Left-back

Team information
- Current team: 1. FC Bocholt
- Number: 28

Youth career
- –2005: 1. FC Wülfrath
- 2005–2016: Bayer Leverkusen

Senior career*
Years	Team	Apps	(Gls)
2016–2017	1. FC Nürnberg II	16	(0)
2017–2019	Schalke 04 II	65	(1)
2019–2021	Schalke 04	1	(0)
2020	→ Viktoria Köln (loan)	17	(2)
2020–2021	→ Vitória Guimarães (loan)	1	(0)
2021–2023	SC Paderborn	25	(1)
2023–2024	Waldhof Mannheim	26	(0)
2024–2025	SV Sandhausen	7	(0)
2025–	1. FC Bocholt	22	(2)
- * Club domestic league appearances and goals as of 24 June 2026

Jonas Carls (born 25 March 1997) is a German professional footballer who plays as a left-back for Regionalliga West club 1. FC Bocholt.

== Career ==
Carls made his professional debut for Schalke 04 in the Bundesliga on 20 April 2019, starting in the home match against 1899 Hoffenheim.

On 30 August 2024, Carls signed with SV Sandhausen.

== Career statistics ==
As of 1 July 2021

Appearances and goals by club, season and competition
Club	Season	League			Cup		Europe		Total	
Club	Season	Division	Apps	Goals	Apps	Goals	Apps	Goals	Apps	Goals
1. FC Nürnberg II	2016–17	Regionalliga Bayern	16	0	—		—		16	0
Schalke 04 II	2017–18	Oberliga Westfalen	31	1	—		—		31	1
Schalke 04 II	2018–19	Oberliga Westfalen	22	0	—		—		22	0
Schalke 04 II	2019–20	Regionalliga West	12	0	—		—		12	0
Schalke 04 II	Total		65	1	—		—		65	1
Schalke 04	2018–19	Bundesliga	1	0	0	0	0	0	1	0
Schalke 04	2019–20	Bundesliga	0	0	0	0	—		0	0
Schalke 04	Total		1	0	0	0	0	0	1	0
Viktoria Köln (loan)	2019–20	3. Liga	17	2	—		—		17	2
Vitória Guimarães (loan)	2020–21	Primeira Liga	1	0	0	0	—		1	0
SC Paderborn	2021–22	2. Bundesliga	0	0	0	0	—		0	0
Career total			100	3	0	0	0	0	100	3
