= Schloss Jägerhof =

German castle

Coordinates: 51°13′51.50″N 06°47′16″E

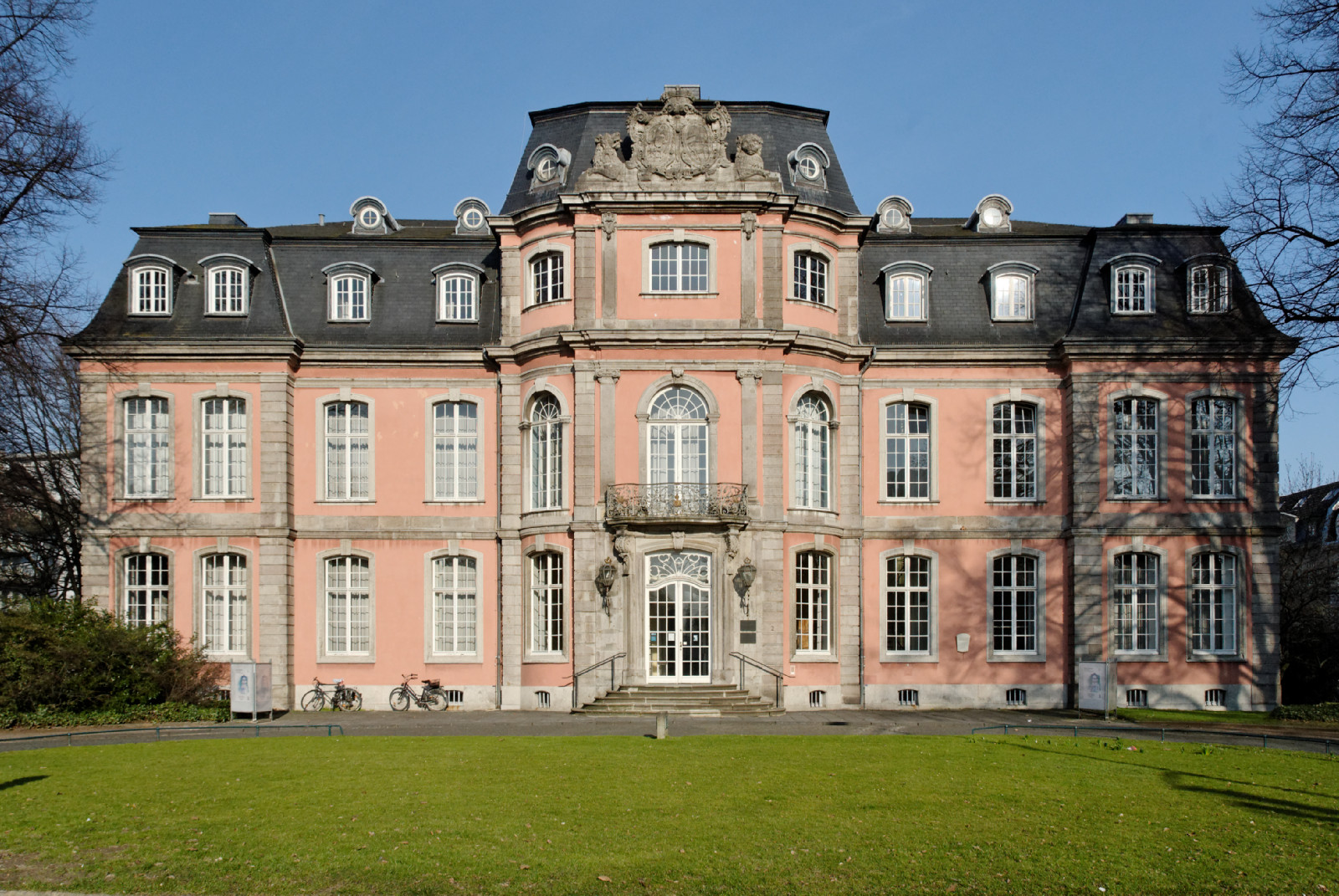
Schloss Jägerhof in 2011

The Schloss Jägerhof, formerly also called die Vénerie (French for hunting), is located at Jacobistraße 2 in Düsseldorf-Pempelfort, near the city centre. It was built between 1752 and 1763 by order of the Prince-elector Karl Theodor. At that time, the castle was still located outside the city gates. The palace is a point de vue of the Hofgarten riding avenue and the Jägerhofstraße. Since 1987, the castle has housed the Goethe-Museum and the Ernst Schneider Foundation.

== History ==
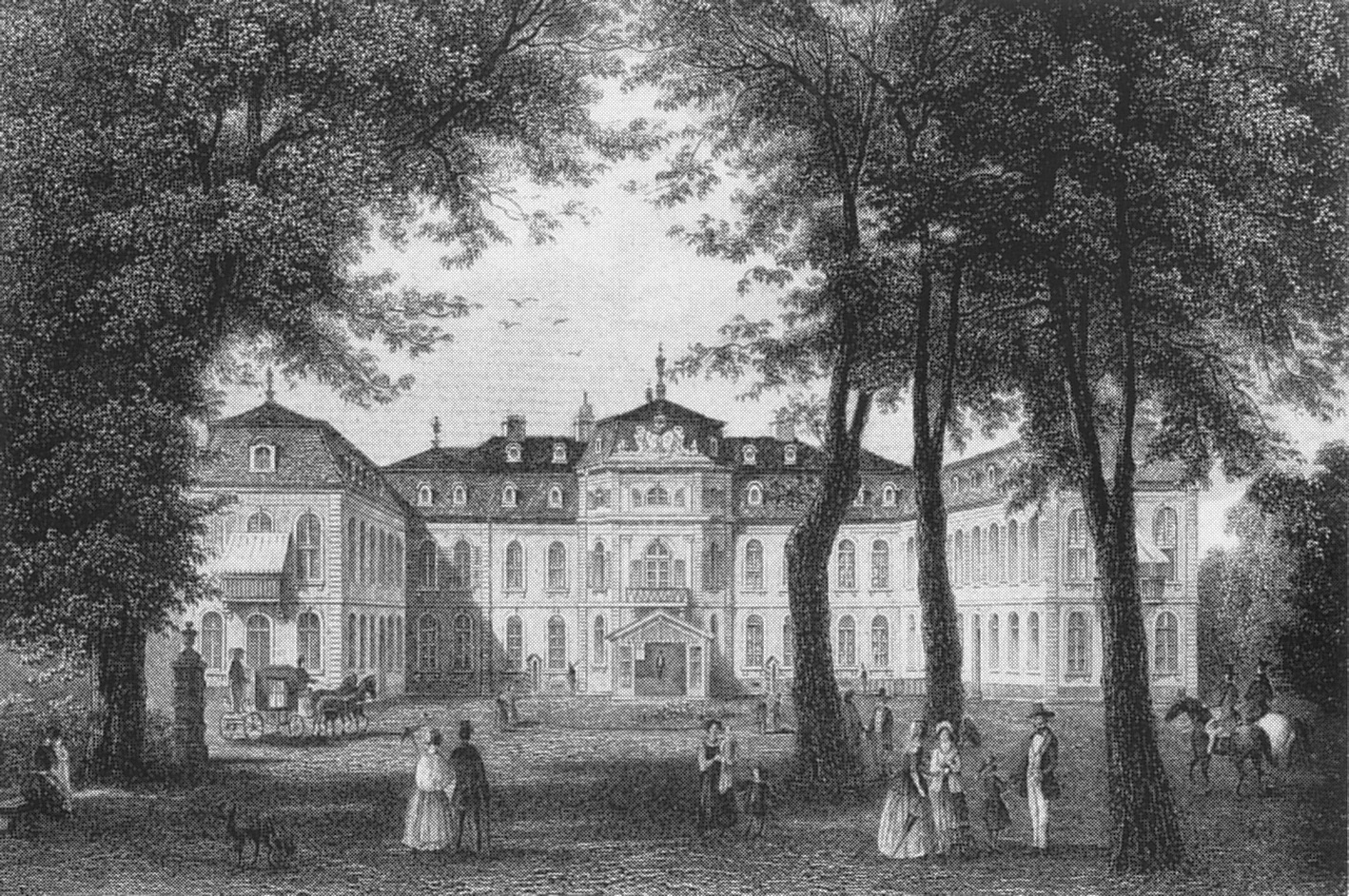
Schloss Jägerhof, steel engraving around 1860

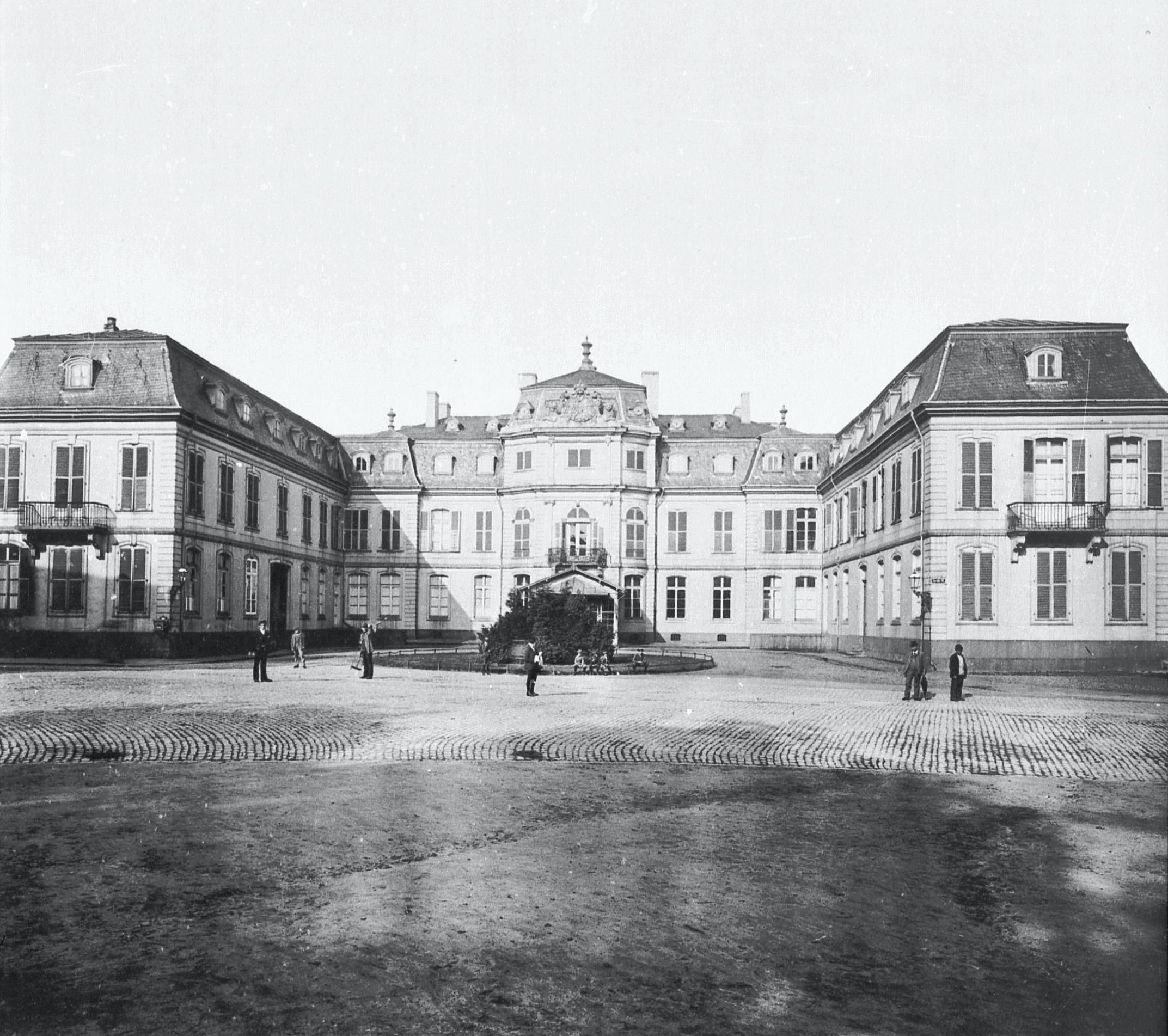
Schloss Jägerhof around 1900 (still with the cour d'honneur and building wings)

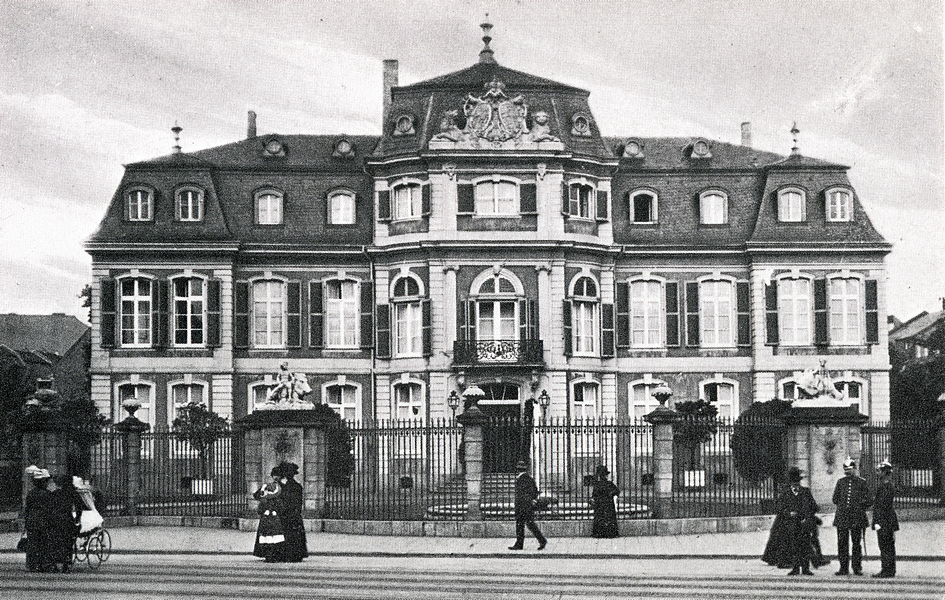
Schloss Jägerhof, main façade ca. 1910

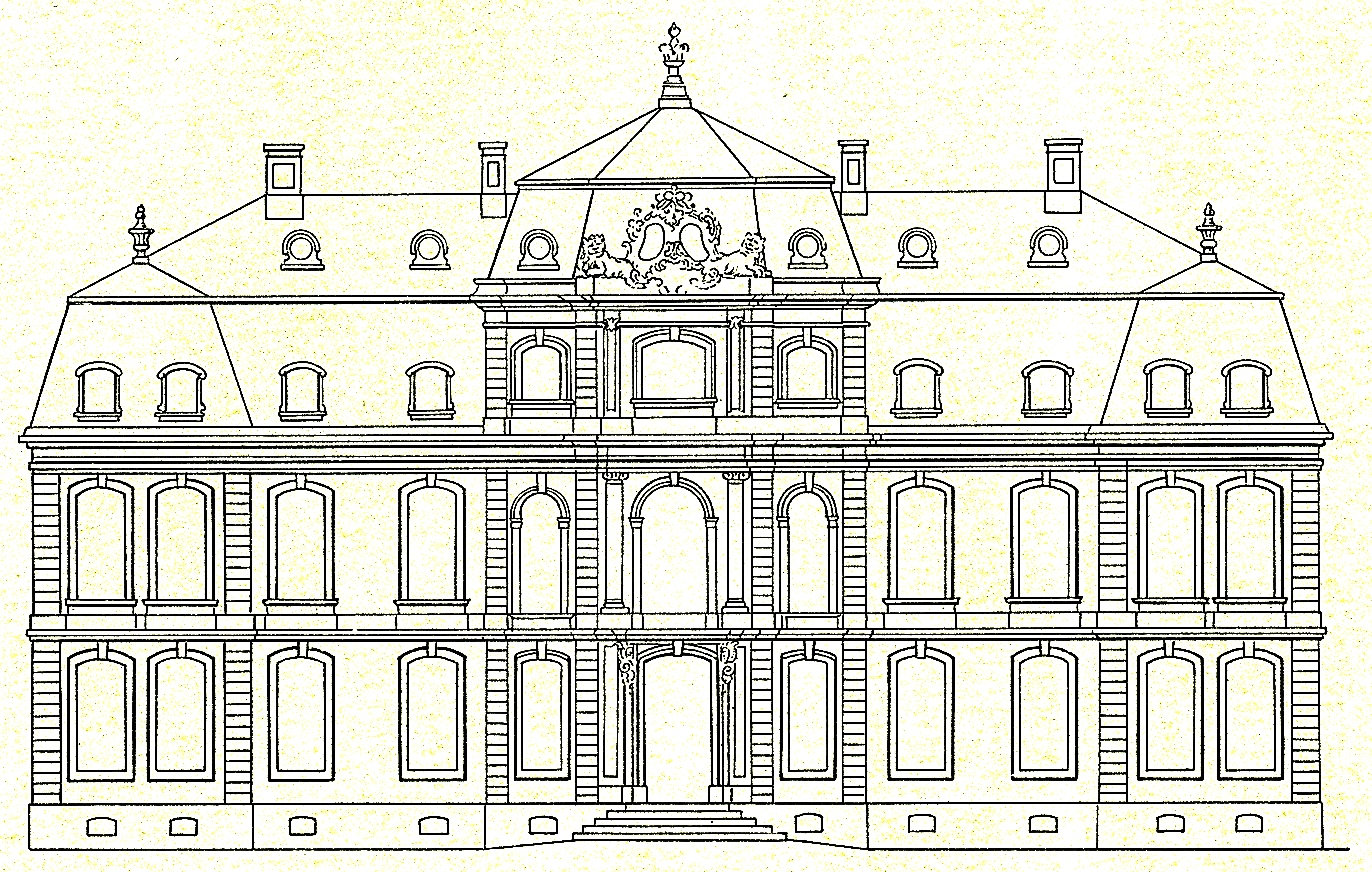
Schloss Jägerhof, design carried out, 1751

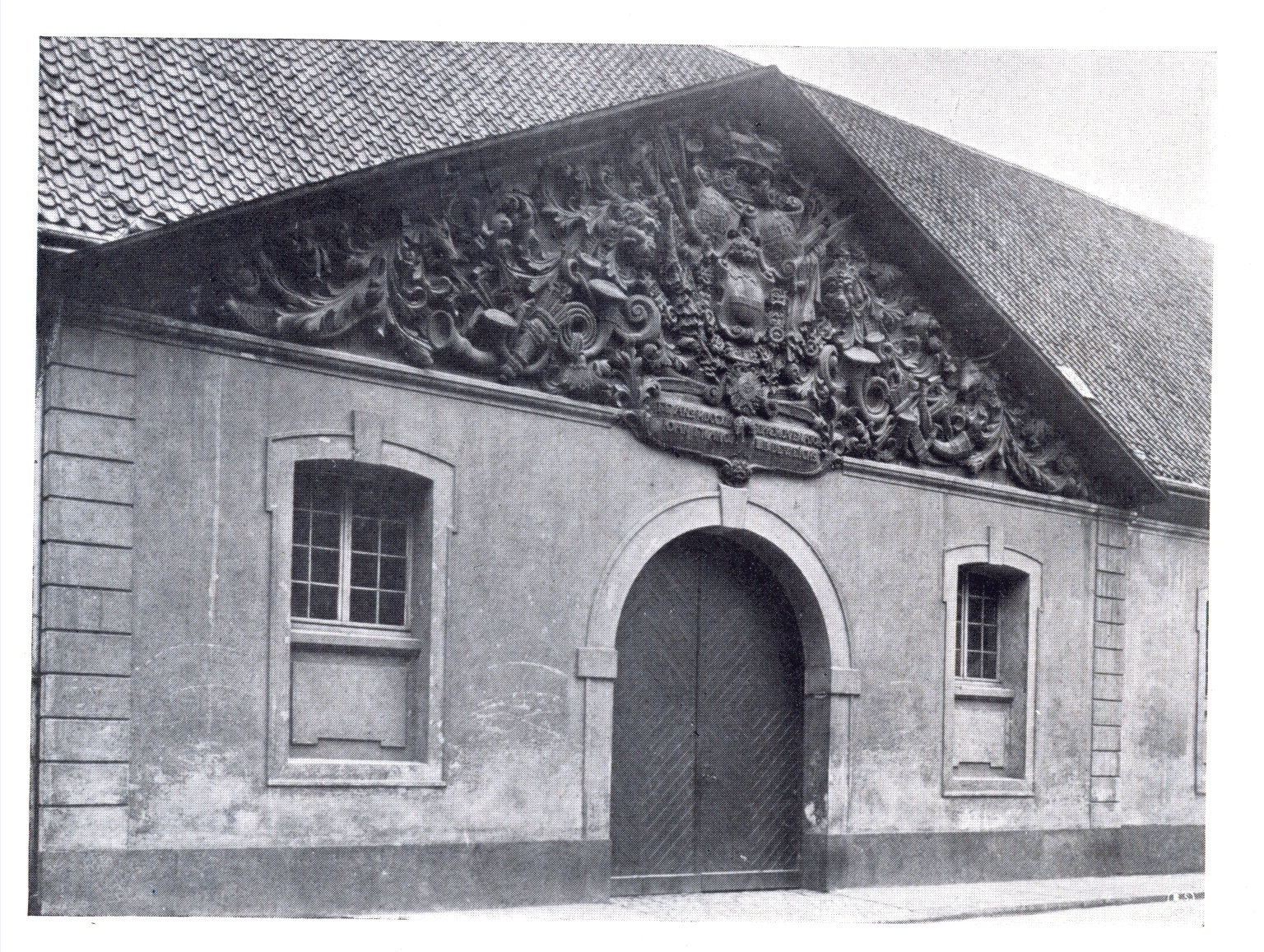
Former mews with gable from the workshop of Gabriel de Grupello (photo ca. 1909

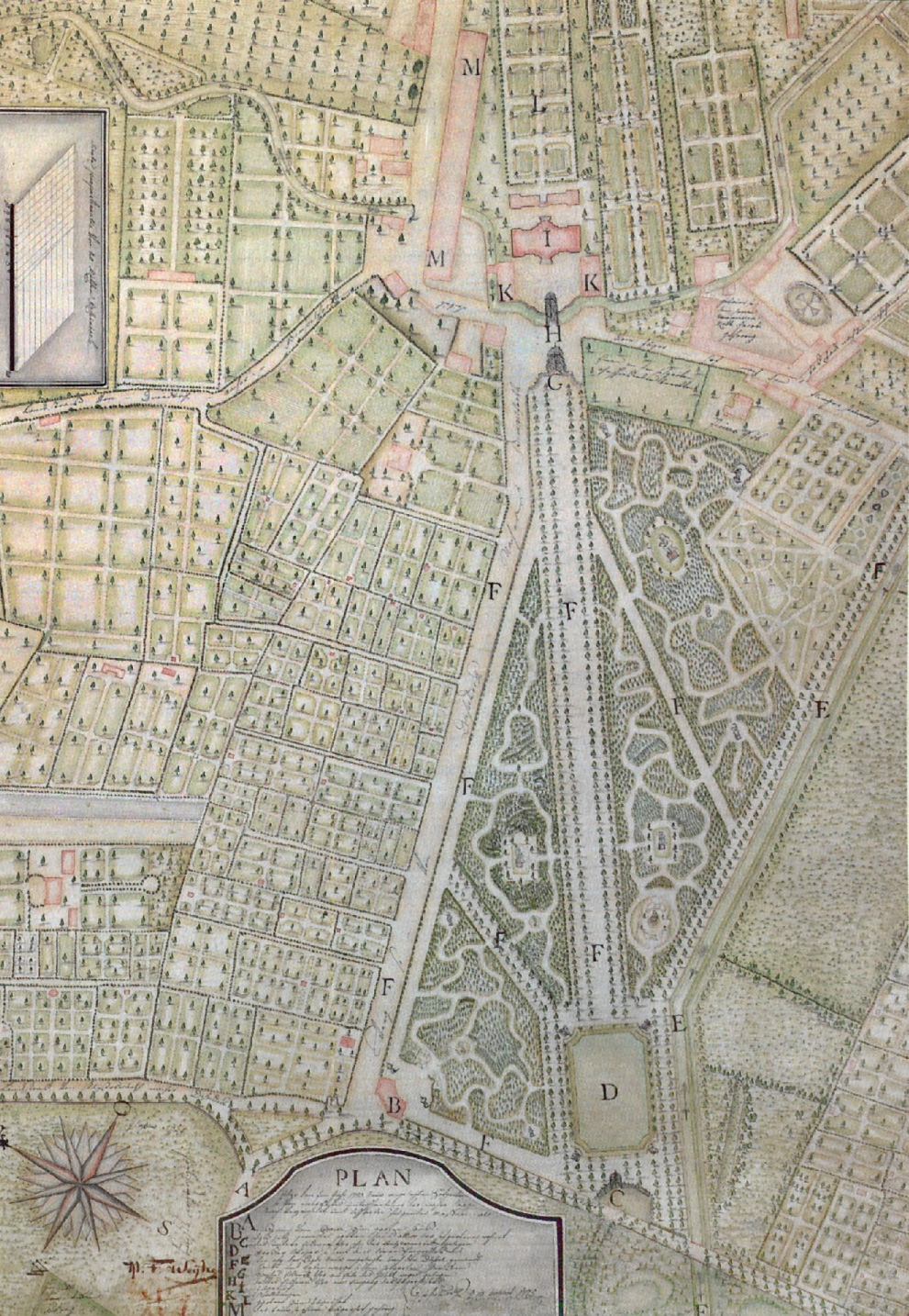
Plan of the Hofgartens in 1775: The Schloss Jägerhof (I) and (K) is a point de vue the main axis of the Hofgartens (F), the mews (M)

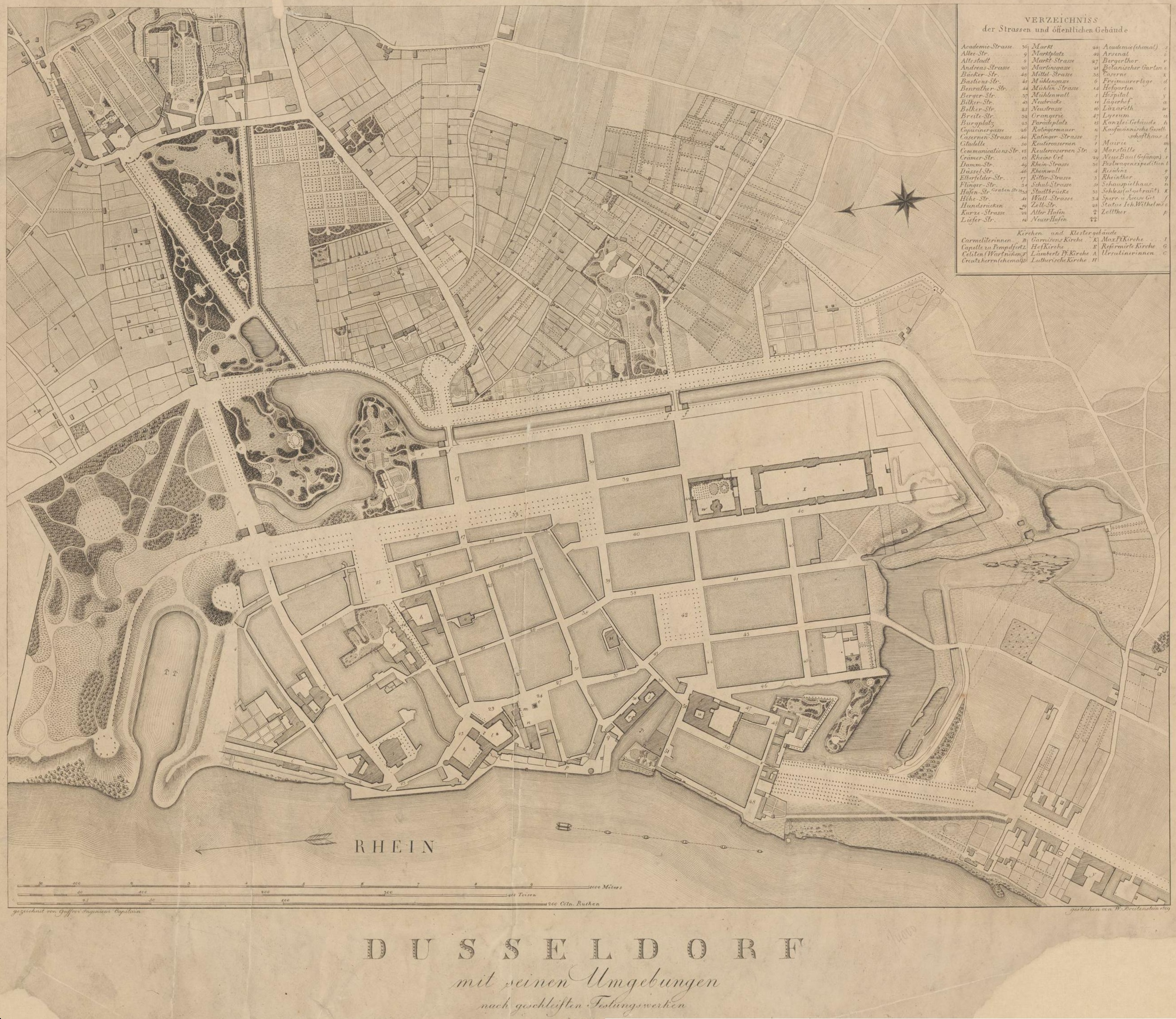
City map of 1809 – the Jägerhof Palace in the context of the courtyard garden, which was redesigned and expanded into an English landscape garden

A first Jägerhof is documented as early as the mid-17th century. This building is said to have been located in the middle of an animal garden roughly near the present-day palace and to have served as the seat of the electoral forestry administration from 1694.

With the death of Johann Wilhelm, Elector Palatine in 1716 and the departure of his widow on 10 September 1717, Düsseldorf lost its status as a residential city. As a result, the buildings fell into disrepair and the entire site initially remained unused for many decades. It was not until the "baroque Baulust" Charles Theodore, Elector of Bavaria, who ruled the Duchy of Jülich-Berg with its capital Düsseldorf as a Nebenland, but harboured great plans, it was revived in the mid-18th century. Karl Theodor commissioned his master builder Johann Joseph Couven to plan and realise a more representative Jägerhof in the style of a Lustschloss of the Rococo.

A first design by Couven from 1749 envisaged a two storey building with a central tower and wing buildings, around which the Düssel river was to be channelled. However, the chief building director Nicolas de Pigage only implemented part of the originally planned construction measures. Thus, the building was completed in 1762 without a side wing. Until 1795, it served as the seat of the supreme huntsmen.

Under the auspices of the electoral governor Johann Ludwig Franz von Goltstein, the older part of the Hofgarten and the Reitallee were converted into public parks in a kind of job creation scheme. This was intended to alleviate the poverty caused by several misharvests in the years 1769–1771. The court gardener's house with a restaurant was also built in 1770.

During the Coalition Wars, the Jägerhof and the Hofgärtnerhaus were almost blown up by the French Revolutionary troops in 1795. However, it did not escape looting by the French troops in that year. The Court Garden was also severely cleared because of its timber stock. During this time, the Jägerhof then served as a lazaret and night camp for the French and remained in a deplorable state until Napoleon's visit in 1811. To this end, everything was hastily renovated and furnished so that the Emperor and his wife Marie Louise could feel at home during their four-day visit. An initially unrealised conversion plan by the classicist architect Adolph von Vagedes is known from this year. In a letter to his wife, Secretary of State count Pierre Louis Roederer described the city of Düsseldorf, which had been prepared for Napoleon's visit, as a "Little Paris".

In 1815, after the Congress of Vienna, the Rhineland fell to Prussia. The family of the division commander Prince Frederick of Prussia, who resided in the Jägerhof Palace from 1821 onwards, found the rooms too small, and so the old plans by Johann Joseph Couven and Adolph von Vagedes were brought out again and the side wings were added under the construction management of Anton Schnitzler. In the 1850s, the family of Karl Anton, Prince of Hohenzollern resided in the palace until the prince became Prussian prime minister in 1858 and moved his residence to Berlin. The palace remained a residence of the House of Hohenzollern until 1885.

Since even the palace, which had been extended with side wings, was considered too small and inappropriate as a residence for a member of the Prussian royal family, the state sold it, including the garden at the rear, to the city of Düsseldorf in 1909. The sale is said to have been made "grudgingly" because otherwise the palace would even have fallen to an outside interested party. The city then tried to sell the site as a building land, but this failed due to protests from many Düsseldorfers. Nevertheless, the garden and side wings were removed from the former official residence, and from 1910 onwards the Jägerhof consisted only of the central wing with a small, fenced-in forecourt. The wing buildings were demolished because they protruded 1.7 m beyond the new alignment line of the widened Jacobistraße.

During the French occupation in 1925, the building was confiscated and used as the headquarters of the commandant's office. In 1934, the consistory of the Evangelical Church in the Rhineland moved into the building. However, the existing lease was unlawfully terminated due to considerable pressure from the NSDAP Gauleiter Friedrich Karl Florian in the Gau Düsseldorf, so that on 30 January 1937 the Gauleitung could be established in the building. It sat here until the heavy air raid on 12 June 1943, during which the castle was severely damaged; it then moved to the building of the Oberlandesgericht Düsseldorf. The palace was not rebuilt until 1950 by Helmut Hentrich. Some receptions of the young Federal Republic took place here.

== Museum ==
Jägerhof Palace has been used as a museum since 1955. Initially by the Stadtmuseum Landeshauptstadt Düsseldorf, later by the Kunstsammlung Nordrhein-Westfalen, which then moved to the new building on Grabbeplatz in 1986. Since 1987, the Goethe Museum has been located in the Jägerhof together with the Ernst Schneider Foundation and, in addition to the comprehensive permanent exhibition on Goethe's life and work, offers changing exhibitions with themes related to the history of the humanities and literature. The Bremen-born publisher Anton Kippenberg was head of the Leipzig Insel Verlag during his lifetime and an important Goethe collector. His daughter brought the private collection into the independent Anton and Katharina Kippenberg Foundation based in Düsseldorf. In the foundation contract of 13 February 1953, the State capital of Düsseldorf undertook to furnish, maintain and develop the collection. Goethe himself stayed in 1774 and 1792 not far from Jägerhof Palace in the house of the philosopher Friedrich Heinrich Jacobi, where the artists' association, Malkasten, has had their headquarters, Malkasten-Haus, since 1861.

== Garden ==
In the garden were the figures The Seasons, which the Düsseldorf professor of sculpture Josef Bäumgen had created in 1774.

== Mews ==
In 1713, Elector Jan Wellem had a hunting lodge, decorated with three gables from the workshop of Gabriël Grupello, built to the north of Jägerhof Palace. After the property of Schloss Jägerhof became the property of the city by purchase in 1909, the old Marstallgebäude standing at the corner of Pempelforter- and Jacobistraße (today Alt-Pempelfort) was demolished, and an orangery was built in its place. The rich wood carvings, three hunting pieces, were reattached to the gables of the new building. During the Second World War, in 1943, the building, on which the carvings were permanently mounted, was completely destroyed. Parts of two gable fields could be saved and stored. The baroque main gable with the Arms of alliance and the east gable, the latter only fragmentary, densely packed with hunting scenes and hunting symbols. In 2012, the building was entered in the list of monuments as a movable monument. In 2014, the gables were taken to the Restoration Centre Düsseldorf, Ehrenhof 3a, where Alexander Diczig carried out the wood sculpting and carving work.
