= 2019–20 FC Schalke 04 season =

Schalke 04
2019–20 season
- President: Clemens Tönnies
- Manager: David Wagner
- Stadium: Veltins-Arena
- Bundesliga: 12th
- DFB-Pokal: Quarter-finals
- Top goalscorer: League: Suat Serdar (7); All: Amine Harit; Benito Raman; Suat Serdar (7 each)
Home colours	Away colours	Third colours

The 2019–20 FC Schalke 04 season was the 116th season in the football club's history and 29th consecutive and 52nd overall season in the top flight of German football, the Bundesliga, having been promoted from the 2. Bundesliga in 1991. In addition to the domestic league, Schalke 04 also were participating in this season's editions of the domestic cup, the DFB-Pokal. This was the 19th season for Schalke in the Veltins-Arena, located in Gelsenkirchen, North Rhine-Westphalia. The season covered a period from 1 July 2019 to 30 June 2020. As a result of the COVID-19 pandemic, Schalke 04 did not play a match between 7 March and 16 May 2020, and their last nine Bundesliga games were played behind closed doors.

== Players ==
Note: Players' appearances and goals only in their Schalke career.

As of end of 2019–2020 season.

No.	Player	Nat.	Pos.	Age	Contract		Bundesliga		Total	
No.	Player	Nat.	Pos.	Age	began	ends	Apps	Goals	Apps	Goals
Goalkeepers				Age						
23	Markus Schubert	(Germany)	GK	22	07/2019	06/2023	9	0	10	0
34	Michael Langer	(Austria)	GK	35	08/2017	06/2021	0	0	0	0
35	Alexander Nübel	(Germany)	GK	23	08/2015	06/2020	46	0	53	0
Defenders
3	Juan Miranda	(Spain)	DF	20	08/2019	06/2021	11	0	12	0
4	Ozan Kabak	(Turkey)	DF	20	07/2019	06/2024	26	3	28	3
5	Matija Nastasić	(Serbia)	DF	27	01/2015	06/2022	107	1	139	2
17	Benjamin Stambouli	(France)	DF	29	08/2016	06/2020	81	0	106	0
20	Jonjoe Kenny	(England)	DF	23	07/2019	06/2020	31	2	34	2
21	Jean-Clair Todibo	(France)	DF	20	01/2020	06/2020	8	0	10	0
24	Bastian Oczipka	(Germany)	DF	31	07/2017	06/2023	84	1	96	1
26	Salif Sané	(Senegal)	DF	29	07/2018	06/2022	45	4	56	6
Midfielders
2	Weston McKennie	(United States)	MF	21	07/2017	06/2024	75	4	91	5
6	Omar Mascarell (captain)	(Spain)	MF	27	07/2018	06/2022	37	0	45	0
8	Suat Serdar	(Germany)	MF	23	07/2018	06/2022	46	9	57	9
16	Nassim Boujellab	(Morocco)	MF	21	04/2019	06/2022	18	0	21	0
18	Daniel Caligiuri	(Germany)	MF	32	01/2017	06/2020	108	17	130	21
25	Amine Harit	(Morocco)	MF	23	07/2017	06/2024	74	10	88	11
28	Alessandro Schöpf	(Austria)	MF	26	01/2016	06/2021	93	10	122	14
37	Levent Mercan	(Germany)	MF	19	08/2019	06/2023	5	0	6	1
Forwards
9	Benito Raman	(Belgium)	FW	25	07/2019	06/2024	25	4	28	7
11	Michael Gregoritsch	(Austria)	FW	26	01/2020	06/2020	14	1	16	1
14	Rabbi Matondo	(Wales)	FW	19	01/2019	06/2023	27	2	29	2
15	Ahmed Kutucu	(Turkey)	FW	20	02/2019	06/2022	38	5	44	6
19	Guido Burgstaller	(Austria)	FW	31	01/2017	06/2022	95	24	119	32

== Transfers ==
=== In ===
Pos	Player	From	Type	Window	Ends	Fee in €	Ref.
DF	(France) Jean-Clair Todibo	(Spain) Barcelona	Loan	Winter	2020	1,500,000	
FW	(Austria) Michael Gregoritsch	(Germany) FC Augsburg	Loan	Winter	2020	500,000	
DF	(Turkey) Ozan Kabak	(Germany) VfB Stuttgart	Transfer	Summer	2024	15,000,000	
FW	(Belgium) Benito Raman	(Germany) Fortuna Düsseldorf	Transfer	Summer	2024	6,500,000	
FW	(Ghana) Bernard Tekpetey	(Germany) SC Paderborn	Buy-back clause	Summer	2022	2,500,000	
GK	(Germany) Markus Schubert	(Germany) Dynamo Dresden	End of contract	Summer	2023	—	
DF	(England) Jonjoe Kenny	(England) Everton	Loan	Summer	2020	1,000,000	
DF	(Spain) Juan Miranda	(Spain) Barcelona	Loan	Summer	2021	Free	
MF	(Germany) Levent Mercan	(Germany) Schalke 04 U19	Promoted	Summer	2023	—	
DF	(Germany) Jonas Carls	(Germany) Schalke 04 II	Promoted	Summer	2022	—	
DF	(Spain) Pablo Insua	(Spain) SD Huesca	End of loan	Summer	2021	—	—
FW	(Germany) Fabian Reese	(Germany) Greuther Fürth	End of loan	Summer	2020	—	—

=== Out ===
Pos	Player	To	Type	Window	Fee in €	Ref.
GK	(Germany) Ralf Fährmann	(Norway) SK Brann	Loan	Season (Matchday 25)	Free	
FW	(Germany) Fabian Reese	(Germany) Holstein Kiel	Transfer	Winter	100,000	
MF	(Algeria) Nabil Bentaleb	(England) Newcastle United	Loan	Winter	1,000,000	
FW	(Germany) Steven Skrzybski	(Germany) Fortuna Düsseldorf	Loan	Winter	200,000	
DF	(Germany) Jonas Carls	(Germany) Viktoria Köln	Loan	Winter	Free	
FW	(Germany) Mark Uth	(Germany) 1. FC Köln	Loan	Winter	Free	
FW	(Switzerland) Breel Embolo	(Germany) Borussia Mönchengladbach	Transfer	Summer	10,000,000	
MF	(Ukraine) Yevhen Konoplyanka	(Ukraine) Shakhtar Donetsk	Transfer	Summer	1,800,000	
MF	(Germany) Benjamin Goller	(Germany) Werder Bremen	End of contract	Summer	—	—
GK	(Germany) Ralf Fährmann	(England) Norwich City	Loan	Summer	3,000,000	
FW	(Ghana) Bernard Tekpetey	(Germany) Fortuna Düsseldorf	Loan	Summer	1,000,000	
MF	(Germany) Sebastian Rudy	(Germany) 1899 Hoffenheim	Loan	Summer	850,000	
DF	(Morocco) Hamza Mendyl	(France) Dijon	Loan	Summer	500,000	
FW	(Germany) Cedric Teuchert	(Germany) Hannover 96	Loan	Summer	200,000	
DF	(Spain) Pablo Insua	(Spain) Huesca	Loan	Summer	Free	
DF	(Netherlands) Jeffrey Bruma	(Germany) VfL Wolfsburg	End of loan	Summer	—	—
DF	(Germany) Sascha Riether	—	Retired	Summer	—	—

== Club ==
=== Kit ===
Supplier: Umbro / Sponsor: Gazprom

Home	Home alt.	Away	Away alt.	Third

== Friendly matches ==
Win Draw Loss

7 July 2019 1	Rot-Weiß Oberhausen	1–3	Schalke 04	Oberhausen, Germany
18:00 CEST (UTC+2)	März 78'	Report	Matondo 13'; Kutucu 46', 87'	Stadium: Niederrheinstadion; Attendance: 6,000

12 July 2019 2	Bottrop Town XI	1–20	Schalke 04	Bottrop, Germany
18:00 CEST (UTC+2)	Nastasić 30' (o.g.)	Report	Skrzybski 2', 31', 33'; Burgstaller 5', 10', 15', 36', 45', 54'; Albert 16' (o.g.); Raman 41'; Rudy 39' (pen.), 61'; Harit 58' (pen.), 73'; Ceka 64'; Carls 81', 83'; Can 85'; Kutucu 87'	Stadium: Jahnstadion; Attendance: 4,000

14 July 2019 3	Wattenscheid 09	2–2	Schalke 04	Bochum-Wattenscheid, Germany
17:00 CEST (UTC+2)	Buckmaier 56'; Kaya 69'	Report	Kutucu 4'; Skrzybski 55'	Stadium: Lohrheidestadion; Attendance: 8,000

19 July 2019 4	Schalke 04	1–2	Norwich City	Lotte, Germany
18:30 CEST (UTC+2)	Matondo 48'	Report	Pukki 13'; Leitner 59'	Stadium: Sportpark am Lotter Kreuz; Attendance: 3,500

23 July 2019 5	Twente	1–1	Schalke 04	Enschede, Netherlands
19:00 CEST (UTC+2)	Laukart 79'	Report	Firat 82'	Stadium: De Grolsch Veste; Attendance: 19,000

29 July 2019 6	Schalke 04	2–3	Bologna	Kitzbühel, Austria
18:00 CEST (UTC+2)	Reese 9'; Boujellab 88'	Report	Poli 37'; Sansone 45+1'; Palacio 59'	Stadium: Sportplatz Langau; Attendance: 1,521; Referee: Walter Altmann (Austria)

2 August 2019 7	Schalke 04	2–0	Alanyaspor	Mittersill, Austria
14:00 CEST (UTC+2)	Skrzybski 18'; Reese 57'	Report		Stadium: Waldstadion; Attendance: 1,200; Referee: Thomas Steinbeck (Austria)

2 August 2019 8	Schalke 04	3–1	Villarreal	Saalfelden, Austria
18:00 CEST (UTC+2)	Burgstaller 22'; Boujellab 48'; Oczipka 87'	Report	Iborra 35'	Stadium: SaalfeldenArena; Attendance: 1,500; Referee: Stefan Eder (Austria)

6 September 2019 9	Schalke 04	2–4	Viktoria Köln	Bottrop, Germany
18:00 CEST (UTC+2)	Uth 33'; Matondo 39'	Report	Dietz 5'; Serdar 19' (o.g.); Handle 83'; Carratala Jimenez 84'	Stadium: Jahnstadion; Attendance: 1,500

7 January 2020 10	Schalke 04	0–1	Sint-Truiden	San Pedro del Pinatar, Spain
17:00 CET (UTC+1)		Report	Suzuki 28'	Stadium: Pinatar Arena; Attendance: 1,000

10 January 2020 11	Hamburger SV	0–4	Schalke 04	Hamburg, Germany
18:00 CET (UTC+1)		Report	Gregoritsch 18'; Raman 58'; Schöpf 64'; Matondo 87'	Stadium: Volksparkstadion; Attendance: 11,918; Referee: Pascal Müller (Germany)

18 January 2020 12	Schalke 04	2–0	Preußen Münster	Gelsenkirchen, Germany
	Burgstaller 51'; Becker 54'	Report		Stadium: Training Ground 3 Attendance: not public Referee: Florian Exner (Germany)

== Competitions ==
Win Draw Loss

=== Overview ===
Competition	First match	Last match	Starting round	Final position	Record							
Competition	First match	Last match	Starting round	Final position	Pld	W	D	L	GF	GA	GD	Win %
Bundesliga	17 August 2019	27 June 2020	Matchday 1	12th	34	9	12	13	38	58	−20	26.47
DFB-Pokal	10 August 2019	3 March 2020	Round 1	Quarter-finals	4	3	0	1	11	5	+6	75.00
Total					38	12	12	14	49	63	−14	31.58

Last updated: 27 June 2020
Source: Competitions

=== Bundesliga ===
==== League table ====
Pos	Team	Pld	W	D	L	GF	GA	GD	Pts
10	Hertha BSC	34	11	8	15	48	59	−11	41
11	Union Berlin	34	12	5	17	41	58	−17	41
12	Schalke 04	34	9	12	13	38	58	−20	39
13	Mainz 05	34	11	4	19	44	65	−21	37
14	1. FC Köln	34	10	6	18	51	69	−18	36

Source: DFB
Rules for classification: 1) Points; 2) Goal difference; 3) Goals scored; 4) Head-to-head results; 5) Head-to-head away goals scored; 6) Away goals scored; 7) Play-off.

==== Results summary ====
Overall								Home						Away					
Pld	W	D	L	GF	GA	GD	Pts	W	D	L	GF	GA	GD	W	D	L	GF	GA	GD
34	9	12	13	38	58	−20	39	5	7	5	20	27	−7	4	5	8	18	31	−13

Last updated: 27 June 2020.
Source: Bundesliga

==== Results by round ====
Round	1	2	3	4	5	6	7	8	9	10	11	12	13	14	15	16	17	18	19	20	21	22	23	24	25	26	27	28	29	30	31	32	33	34
Ground	A	H	H	A	H	A	H	A	H	A	H	A	H	A	H	A	H	H	A	A	H	A	H	A	H	A	H	A	H	A	H	A	H	A
Result	D	L	W	W	W	W	D	L	D	W	D	W	W	L	W	D	D	W	L	D	D	D	L	L	D	L	L	L	L	D	D	L	L	L
Position	10	12	9	6	5	4	6	7	7	6	7	5	3	4	4	5	5	5	6	6	6	6	6	6	6	8	8	9	10	10	9	10	11	12

Updated to match(es) played on 27 June 2020. Source: DFB
A = Away; H = Home; W = Win; D = Draw; L = Loss

==== Matches ====
The Bundesliga schedule was announced on 28 June 2019.

17 August 2019 1	Borussia Mönchengladbach	0–0	Schalke 04	Mönchengladbach
18:30 CEST (UTC+2)	Nehaus (yellow card) 15'; Bénes (yellow card) 57'; Lainer (yellow card) 89'	Report	Stambouli (yellow card) 16'; Caligiuri (yellow card) 63'	Stadium: Borussia-Park; Attendance: 54,022; Referee: Felix Brych

24 August 2019 2	Schalke 04	0–3	Bayern Munich	Gelsenkirchen
18:30 CEST (UTC+2)		Report	Lewandowski 20' (pen.), 50', 75'	Stadium: Veltins-Arena; Attendance: 62,271; Referee: Marco Fritz

31 August 2019 3	Schalke 04	3–0	Hertha BSC	Gelsenkirchen
15:30 CEST (UTC+2)	Stark 38' (o.g.); Rekik 48' (o.g.); Mascarell (yellow card) 52'; Kenny 85'	Report	Ibišević (yellow card) 40'	Stadium: Veltins-Arena; Attendance: 58,875; Referee: Tobias Stieler

15 September 2019 4	SC Paderborn	1–5	Schalke 04	Paderborn
18:00 CEST (UTC+2)	Cauly 8'; Michel (yellow card) 41'; Gjasula (yellow card) 73'	Report	Sané 33'; Kenny (yellow card) 38'; Serdar 49'; Harit 71', 85'; Kutucu 83'	Stadium: Benteler-Arena; Attendance: 15,000; Referee: Robert Schröder

20 September 2019 5	Schalke 04	2–1	Mainz 05	Gelsenkirchen
20:30 CEST (UTC+2)	Serdar 36'; McKennie (yellow card) 47'; Harit 89'	Report	Brosinski (yellow card) 65'; Onisiwo 75'	Stadium: Veltins-Arena; Attendance: 58,687; Referee: Daniel Schlager

28 September 2019 6	RB Leipzig	1–3	Schalke 04	Leipzig
15:30 CEST (UTC+2)	Halstenberg (yellow card) 45+5'; Forsberg 83'	Report	Sané 29'; Harit 43' (pen.); Matondo 58'; Caligiuri (yellow card) 86'	Stadium: Red Bull Arena; Attendance: 42,146; Referee: Manuel Gräfe

5 October 2019 7	Schalke 04	1–1	1. FC Köln	Gelsenkirchen
18:30 CEST (UTC+2)	Kenny (yellow card) 20'; Serdar (yellow card) 36', (goal) 72'; Sané (yellow card) 45+1'; Oczipka (yellow card) 64'	Report	Katterbach (yellow card) 22'; Ehizibue (yellow card) 40'; Terodde (yellow card) 67'; Hector 90+1'; Modeste (yellow card) 90+3'	Stadium: Veltins-Arena; Attendance: 61,883; Referee: Tobias Welz

20 October 2019 8	1899 Hoffenheim	2–0	Schalke 04	Sinsheim
18:00 CEST (UTC+2)	Geiger (yellow card) 37'; Posch (yellow card) 68'; Kramarić 72'; Bebou 85'	Report	Harit (yellow card) 80'; Sané (yellow card) 83'	Stadium: Rhein-Neckar-Arena; Attendance: 29,477; Referee: Robert Hartmann

26 October 2019 9	Schalke 04	0–0	Borussia Dortmund	Gelsenkirchen
15:30 CEST (UTC+2)	Stambouli (yellow card) 20'; Sané (yellow card) 83'; Kutucu (yellow card) 90'	Report	Weigl (yellow card) 18'; Hazard (yellow card) 70'	Stadium: Veltins-Arena; Attendance: 61,873; Referee: Felix Brych

3 November 2019 10	FC Augsburg	2–3	Schalke 04	Augsburg
18:00 CET (UTC+1)	Baier 38', (yellow card) 70'; Finnbogason 60' (pen.); Khedira (yellow card) 90'; Vargas (yellow card) 90+5'	Report	Caligiuri (yellow card) 23'; Mascarell (yellow card) 35'; Lichtsteiner 45+1' (o.g.); McKennie (yellow card) 57'; Kabak 71'; Harit 82'; Schöpf (yellow card) 90+3'; Nübel (yellow card) 90+5'	Stadium: WWK Arena; Attendance: 30,361; Referee: Patrick Ittrich

9 November 2019 11	Schalke 04	3–3	Fortuna Düsseldorf	Gelsenkirchen
15:30 CET (UTC+1)	Caligiuri 33'; McKennie (yellow card) 62'; Kabak 67'; Serdar 79', (yellow card) 80'	Report	Morales (yellow card) 53'; Hennings 62' (pen.), 74', 85'; Fink (yellow card) 76'; Hoffmann (yellow card) 89'; Ayhan (yellow card) 90+1'	Stadium: Veltins-Arena; Attendance: 61,831; Referee: Robert Hartmann

23 November 2019 12	Werder Bremen	1–2	Schalke 04	Bremen
15:30 CET (UTC+1)	Eggestein (yellow card) 51'; Langkamp (yellow card) 55'; Bargfrede (yellow card) 70'; Osako 80'	Report	Harit 43'; Raman 53'; Nastasić (yellow card) 72'; Mascarell (yellow card) 87'	Stadium: Weser-Stadion; Attendance: 42,100; Referee: Benjamin Cortus

29 November 2019 13	Schalke 04	2–1	Union Berlin	Gelsenkirchen
20:30 CET (UTC+1)	Raman 23'; Serdar 86'; McKennie (yellow card) 90'	Report	Schlotterbeck (yellow card) 22'; Ingvartsen 36' (pen.); Andersson (yellow card) 38'; Hübner (yellow card) 42'; Friedrich (yellow card) 69'	Stadium: Veltins-Arena; Attendance: 61,837; Referee: Daniel Schlager

7 December 2019 14	Bayer Leverkusen	2–1	Schalke 04	Leverkusen
18:30 CET (UTC+1)	Alario 15', 81', (yellow card) 83'; Wendell (yellow card) 43'	Report	Caligiuri (yellow card) 29'; Raman (yellow card) 53', (goal) 82'	Stadium: BayArena; Attendance: 30,210; Referee: Harm Osmers

15 December 2019 15	Schalke 04	1–0	Eintracht Frankfurt	Gelsenkirchen
18:00 CET (UTC+1)	Harit (yellow card) 50'; Raman 53'; Nübel (red card) 67'	Report	Rode (yellow card) 34'; Kostić (yellow card) 57'; Torró (yellow card) 62'; Ndicka (yellow card) 90+2'	Stadium: Veltins-Arena; Attendance: 60,811; Referee: Felix Zwayer

18 December 2019 16	VfL Wolfsburg	1–1	Schalke 04	Wolfsburg
20:30 CET (UTC+1)	Tisserand (yellow card) 60'; Mbabu 82'	Report	Kabak 51'; Burgstaller (yellow card) 90+3'	Stadium: Volkswagen Arena; Attendance: 24,651; Referee: Martin Petersen

21 December 2019 17	Schalke 04	2–2	SC Freiburg	Gelsenkirchen
15:30 CET (UTC+1)	Serdar 26'; Kenny (yellow card) 61'; Kutucu 80'	Report	Petersen 54' (pen.); Höfler (yellow card) 59'; Grifo 67' (pen.)	Stadium: Veltins-Arena; Attendance: 61,867; Referee: Felix Brych

17 January 2020 18	Schalke 04	2–0	Borussia Mönchengladbach	Gelsenkirchen
20:30 CET (UTC+1)	Kenny (yellow card) 19'; Serdar 48'; Gregoritsch 58'; Kabak (yellow card) 76'; Schöpf (yellow card) 79'	Report	Lainer (yellow card) 31'; Thuram (yellow card) 51'; Jantschke (yellow card) 80'; Stindl (yellow card) 90+2'	Stadium: Veltins-Arena; Attendance: 62,217; Referee: Deniz Aytekin

25 January 2020 19	Bayern Munich	5–0	Schalke 04	Munich
18:30 CET (UTC+1)	Lewandowski 6'; Müller 45+2'; Goretzka 6'; Thiago 58'; Gnabry 89'	Report		Stadium: Allianz Arena; Attendance: 75,000; Referee: Manuel Gräfe

31 January 2020 20	Hertha BSC	0–0	Schalke 04	Berlin
20:30 CET (UTC+1)	Mittelstädt (yellow card) 90+1'	Report	Oczipka (yellow card) 71'	Stadium: Olympiastadion; Attendance: 47,863; Referee: Sascha Stegemann

8 February 2020 21	Schalke 04	1–1	SC Paderborn	Gelsenkirchen
15:30 CET (UTC+1)	Nastasić (yellow card) 53'; Kutucu 63'; Mascarell (yellow card) 72'	Report	Mamba (yellow card) 72'; Gjasula 81'; Jans (yellow card) 84'; Zingerle (yellow card) 90+1'	Stadium: Veltins-Arena; Attendance: 61,614; Referee: Felix Brych

16 February 2020 22	Mainz 05	0–0	Schalke 04	Mainz
18:00 CET (UTC+1)	Bruma (yellow card) 33'; Brosinski (yellow card) 53'	Report	Todibo (yellow card) 58'; Kutucu (yellow card) 86'	Stadium: Opel Arena; Attendance: 27,482; Referee: Guido Winkmann

22 February 2020 23	Schalke 04	0–5	RB Leipzig	Gelsenkirchen
18:30 CET (UTC+1)	Raman (yellow card) 3'; Harit (yellow card) 43'	Report	Sabitzer 1'; Laimer (yellow card) 5'; Werner (yellow card) 57', (goal) 61'; Halstenberg 68'; Upamecano (yellow card) 78'; Angeliño 80'; Forsberg 89'	Stadium: Veltins-Arena; Attendance: 61,433; Referee: Sascha Stegemann

29 February 2020 24	1. FC Köln	3–0	Schalke 04	Cologne
18:30 CET (UTC+1)	Bornauw 9'; Córdoba (yellow card) 38', (goal) 39'; Nübel 75' (o.g.)	Report	Schöpf (yellow card) 66'; Burgstaller (yellow card) 80'	Stadium: RheinEnergieStadion; Attendance: 50,000; Referee: Manuel Gräfe

7 March 2020 25	Schalke 04	1–1	1899 Hoffenheim	Gelsenkirchen
15:30 CET (UTC+1)	McKennie 20'	Report	Baumgartner 69'; Posch (yellow card) 81'	Stadium: Veltins-Arena; Attendance: 58,324; Referee: Sven Jablonski

16 May 2020 26	Borussia Dortmund	4–0	Schalke 04	Dortmund
15:30 CEST (UTC+2)	Haaland 29'; Guerreiro 45', 63'; Hazard 48'; Delaney (yellow card) 53'; Piszczek (yellow card) 73'	Report	Sané (yellow card) 48'; Matondo (yellow card) 86'	Stadium: Signal Iduna Park; Attendance: 0 Referee: Deniz Aytekin
Note: The match was originally scheduled for 14 March 2020, but postponed due to the COVID-19 pandemic. For the same reason it was played behind closed doors.

24 May 2020 27	Schalke 04	0–3	FC Augsburg	Gelsenkirchen
13:30 CEST (UTC+2)		Report	Löwen 6'; Vargas (yellow card) 8'; Gruezo (yellow card) 60'; Sarenren Bazee 76'; Córdova 90+1'	Stadium: Veltins-Arena; Attendance: 0 Referee: Sascha Stegemann
Note: The match was originally scheduled for 21 March 2020, but postponed due to the COVID-19 pandemic. For the same reason it was played behind closed doors.

27 May 2020 28	Fortuna Düsseldorf	2–1	Schalke 04	Düsseldorf
20:30 CEST (UTC+2)	Sobottka (yellow card) 52'; Hennings 63'; Karaman 68'; Hoffmann (yellow card) 80'; Bodzek (yellow card) 90+3'	Report	Burgstaller (yellow card) 18'; Kabak (yellow card) 45'; McKennie 53'	Stadium: Merkur Spiel-Arena; Attendance: 0 Referee: Tobias Welz
Note: The match was originally scheduled for 5 April 2020, but postponed due to the COVID-19 pandemic. For the same reason it was played behind closed doors.

30 May 2020 29	Schalke 04	0–1	Werder Bremen	Gelsenkirchen
15:30 CEST (UTC+2)	Gregoritsch (yellow card) 3'; Todibo (yellow card) 26'; McKennie (yellow card) 44'; Boujellab (yellow card) 83'; Kabak (yellow card) 90+3'	Report	Langkamp (yellow card) 20'; Bittencourt 32'; Osako (yellow card) 63'; Selke (yellow card) 90+3'	Stadium: Veltins-Arena; Attendance: 0 Referee: Felix Zwayer
Note: The match was originally scheduled for 11–13 April 2020, but postponed due to the COVID-19 pandemic. For the same reason it was played behind closed doors.

7 June 2020 30	Union Berlin	1–1	Schalke 04	Berlin
15:30 CEST (UTC+2)	Andrich 11', (yellow card) 37'; Trimmel (yellow card) 36'; Friedrich (yellow card) 73'	Report	Kenny 28'; Miranda (yellow card) 78'	Stadium: Stadion An der Alten Försterei; Attendance: 0 Referee: Tobias Stieler
Note: The match was originally scheduled for 17–20 April 2020, but postponed due to the COVID-19 pandemic. For the same reason it was played behind closed doors.

14 June 2020 31	Schalke 04	1–1	Bayer Leverkusen	Gelsenkirchen
18:00 CEST (UTC+2)	Kabak (yellow card) 9'; Miranda (yellow card) 35'; Caligiuri 51' (pen.), (yellow card) 60'; McKennie (yellow card) 61'	Report	Alario (yellow card) 59'; Miranda 81' (o.g.)	Stadium: Veltins-Arena; Attendance: 0 Referee: Daniel Siebert
Note: The match was originally scheduled for 24–27 April 2020, but postponed due to the COVID-19 pandemic. For the same reason it was played behind closed doors.

17 June 2020 32	Eintracht Frankfurt	2–1	Schalke 04	Frankfurt
18:30 CEST (UTC+2)	Silva 28'; Kamada (yellow card) 37'; Abraham 50'; Trapp (yellow card) 90+1'; Dost (yellow card) 90+2'	Report	McKennie (yellow card) 37', (goal) 59'; Oczipka (yellow card) 54'; Bozdogan (yellow card) 56' (yellow-red card) 77'; Boujellab (yellow card) 74'	Stadium: Commerzbank-Arena; Attendance: 0 Referee: Guido Winkmann
Note: The match was originally scheduled for 2–4 May 2020, but postponed due to the COVID-19 pandemic. For the same reason it was played behind closed doors.

20 June 2020 33	Schalke 04	1–4	VfL Wolfsburg	Gelsenkirchen
15:30 CEST (UTC+2)	Oczipka (yellow card) 30'; Gregoritsch (yellow card) 35'; Kenny (yellow card) 38'; McKennie (yellow card) 58'; Matondo 70'	Report	Steffen (yellow card) 11'; Weghorst 16', 56'; Mbabu 59', (yellow card) 81'; João Victor 69'; Roussillon (yellow card) 87'	Stadium: Veltins-Arena; Attendance: 0 Referee: Sascha Stegemann
Note: The match was originally scheduled for 9 May 2020, but postponed due to the COVID-19 pandemic. For the same reason it was played behind closed doors.

27 June 2020 34	SC Freiburg	4–0	Schalke 04	Freiburg
15:30 CEST (UTC+2)	Waldschmidt 20', 57'; Schmid 38'; Höler 46'; Lienhart (yellow card) 60'	Report		Stadium: Schwarzwald-Stadion; Attendance: 0 Referee: Martin Petersen
Note: The match was originally scheduled for 16 May 2020, but postponed due to the COVID-19 pandemic. For the same reason it was played behind closed doors.

=== DFB-Pokal ===
10 August 2019 First round	SV Drochtersen/Assel	0–5	Schalke 04	Drochtersen
15:30 CEST (UTC+2)	Ioannou (yellow card) 14'; Andrijanić (yellow card) 39'; Elfers (yellow card) 49'	Report	Nastasić (yellow card) 23'; Skrzybski 44'; Burgstaller 61', 83'; Caligiuri 65' (pen.); Mercan 73'; Stambouli (yellow card) 78'	Stadium: Kehdinger Stadion; Attendance: 8,000; Referee: Michael Bacher

29 October 2019 Second round	Arminia Bielefeld	2–3	Schalke 04	Bielefeld
20:45 CET (UTC+1)	Klos 72'; Soukou 77'	Report	Schöpf 16'; Raman 25', 31'	Stadium: Bielefelder Alm; Attendance: 26,203; Referee: Manuel Gräfe

4 February 2020 Round of 16	Schalke 04	3–2 (a.e.t.)	Hertha BSC	Gelsenkirchen
20:45 CET (UTC+1)	Harit (yellow card) 65', (goal) 82'; Caligiuri 76'; Raman (yellow card) 80', (goal) 115'; Miranda (yellow card) 105+2'; Oczipka (yellow card) 111'	Report	Köpke 12'; Piątek 39'; Torunarigha (yellow card) 85' (yellow-red card) 100'; Skjelbred (yellow card) 103'	Stadium: Veltins-Arena; Attendance: 53,525; Referee: Harm Osmers

3 March 2020 Quarter-finals	Schalke 04	0–1	Bayern Munich	Gelsenkirchen
20:45 CET (UTC+1)	Nastasić (yellow card) 66'; Burgstaller (yellow card) 66'; McKennie (yellow card) 86'; Raman (yellow card) 90'	Report	Kimmich 40'	Stadium: Veltins-Arena; Attendance: 62,271; Referee: Tobias Stieler

== Statistics ==
As of end of 2019–2020 season

=== Squad statistics ===
No.	Player	Nat.	Pos.	Total					Bundesliga					DFB-Pokal				
No.	Player	Nat.	Pos.	Apps	St.	Goal	Booked	Sent off (straight red)	Apps	St.	Goal	Booked	Sent off (straight red)	Apps	St.	Goal	Booked	Sent off (straight red)
23	Markus Schubert	(Germany)	GK	10	9	0	0	0	9	8	0	0	0	1	1	0	0	0
34	Michael Langer	(Austria)	GK	0	0	0	0	0	0	0	0	0	0	0	0	0	0	0
35	Alexander Nübel	(Germany)	GK	29	29	0	1	1	26	26	0	1	1	3	3	0	0	0
3	Juan Miranda	(Spain)	DF	12	8	0	3	0	11	8	0	2	0	1	0	0	1	0
4	Ozan Kabak	(Turkey)	DF	28	22	3	4	0	26	21	3	4	0	2	1	0	0	0
5	Matija Nastasić	(Serbia)	DF	20	18	0	4	0	16	15	0	2	0	4	3	0	2	0
17	Benjamin Stambouli	(France)	DF	10	10	0	3	0	9	9	0	2	0	1	1	0	1	0
20	Jonjoe Kenny	(England)	DF	34	34	2	5	0	31	31	2	5	0	3	3	0	0	0
21	Jean-Clair Todibo	(France)	DF	10	6	0	2	0	8	4	0	2	0	2	2	0	0	0
24	Bastian Oczipka	(Germany)	DF	38	37	0	5	0	34	33	0	4	0	4	4	0	1	0
26	Salif Sané	(Senegal)	DF	16	14	2	4	0	15	13	2	4	0	1	1	0	0	0
31	Timo Becker (Note: Player from Schalke II)	(Germany)	DF	11	5	0	0	0	10	4	0	0	0	1	1	0	0	0
33	Malick Thiaw (Note: Player from Schalke U19)	(Finland)	DF	4	0	0	0	0	4	0	0	0	0	0	0	0	0	0
~~27~~	Jonas Carls (Note: Player transferred out during the season)	(Germany)	DF	0	0	0	0	0	0	0	0	0	0	0	0	0	0	0
2	Weston McKennie	(United States)	MF	32	26	3	9	0	28	24	3	8	0	4	2	0	1	0
6	Omar Mascarell	(Spain)	MF	26	26	0	4	0	23	23	0	4	0	3	3	0	0	0
8	Suat Serdar	(Germany)	MF	22	20	7	2	0	20	19	7	2	0	2	1	0	0	0
16	Nassim Boujellab	(Morocco)	MF	13	5	0	2	0	11	3	0	2	0	2	2	0	0	0
18	Daniel Caligiuri	(Germany)	MF	30	28	4	5	0	28	26	2	5	0	2	2	2	0	0
25	Amine Harit	(Morocco)	MF	28	27	7	4	0	25	24	6	3	0	3	3	1	1	0
28	Alessandro Schöpf	(Austria)	MF	25	18	1	3	0	22	15	0	3	0	3	3	1	0	0
37	Levent Mercan	(Germany)	MF	6	1	1	0	0	5	1	0	0	0	1	0	1	0	0
40	Can Bozdogan	(Germany)	MF	3	3	0	0	1	3	3	0	0	1	0	0	0	0	0
43	Jonas Hofmann	(Germany)	MF	1	0	0	0	0	1	0	0	0	0	0	0	0	0	0
~~10~~	Nabil Bentaleb	(Algeria)	MF	0	0	0	0	0	0	0	0	0	0	0	0	0	0	0
9	Benito Raman	(Belgium)	FW	28	20	7	4	0	25	19	4	2	0	3	1	3	2	0
11	Michael Gregoritsch	(Austria)	FW	16	11	1	2	0	14	10	1	2	0	2	1	0	0	0
14	Rabbi Matondo	(Wales)	FW	21	15	2	1	0	20	14	2	1	0	1	1	0	0	0
15	Ahmed Kutucu	(Turkey)	FW	28	4	3	2	0	25	3	3	2	0	3	1	0	0	0
19	Guido Burgstaller	(Austria)	FW	24	15	2	4	0	21	13	0	3	0	3	2	2	1	0
~~7~~	Mark Uth	(Germany)	FW	9	5	0	0	0	8	4	0	0	0	1	1	0	0	0
~~21~~	Fabian Reese	(Germany)	FW	2	1	0	0	0	2	1	0	0	0	0	0	0	0	0
~~22~~	Steven Skrzybski	(Germany)	FW	1	1	1	0	0	0	0	0	0	0	1	1	1	0	0
Total				38		47	73	2	34		36	63	2	4		11	10	0

=== Goalscorers ===
Rank	Pos.	Nat	Player	Bundesliga	DFB-Pokal	Total
1	MF	(Germany)	Suat Serdar	7	0	7
1	MF	(Morocco)	Amine Harit	6	1	7
1	FW	(Belgium)	Benito Raman	4	3	7
4	MF	(Germany)	Daniel Caligiuri	2	2	4
5	DF	(Turkey)	Ozan Kabak	3	0	3
5	FW	(Turkey)	Ahmed Kutucu	3	0	3
5	MF	(United States)	Weston McKennie	3	0	3
8	DF	(England)	Jonjoe Kenny	2	0	2
8	FW	(Wales)	Rabbi Matondo	2	0	2
8	DF	(Senegal)	Salif Sané	2	0	2
8	FW	(Austria)	Guido Burgstaller	0	2	2
12	FW	(Austria)	Michael Gregoritsch	1	0	1
12	MF	(Germany)	Levent Mercan	0	1	1
12	MF	(Austria)	Alessandro Schöpf	0	1	1
12	FW	(Germany)	Steven Skrzybski	0	1	1
Own goals				3	0	3
Total				37	11	48

=== Clean sheets ===
Rank	Player	Bundesliga	DFB-Pokal	Total
1	(Germany) Alexander Nübel	6	1	7
2	(Germany) Markus Schubert	2	0	2
