= Haan =

- Town
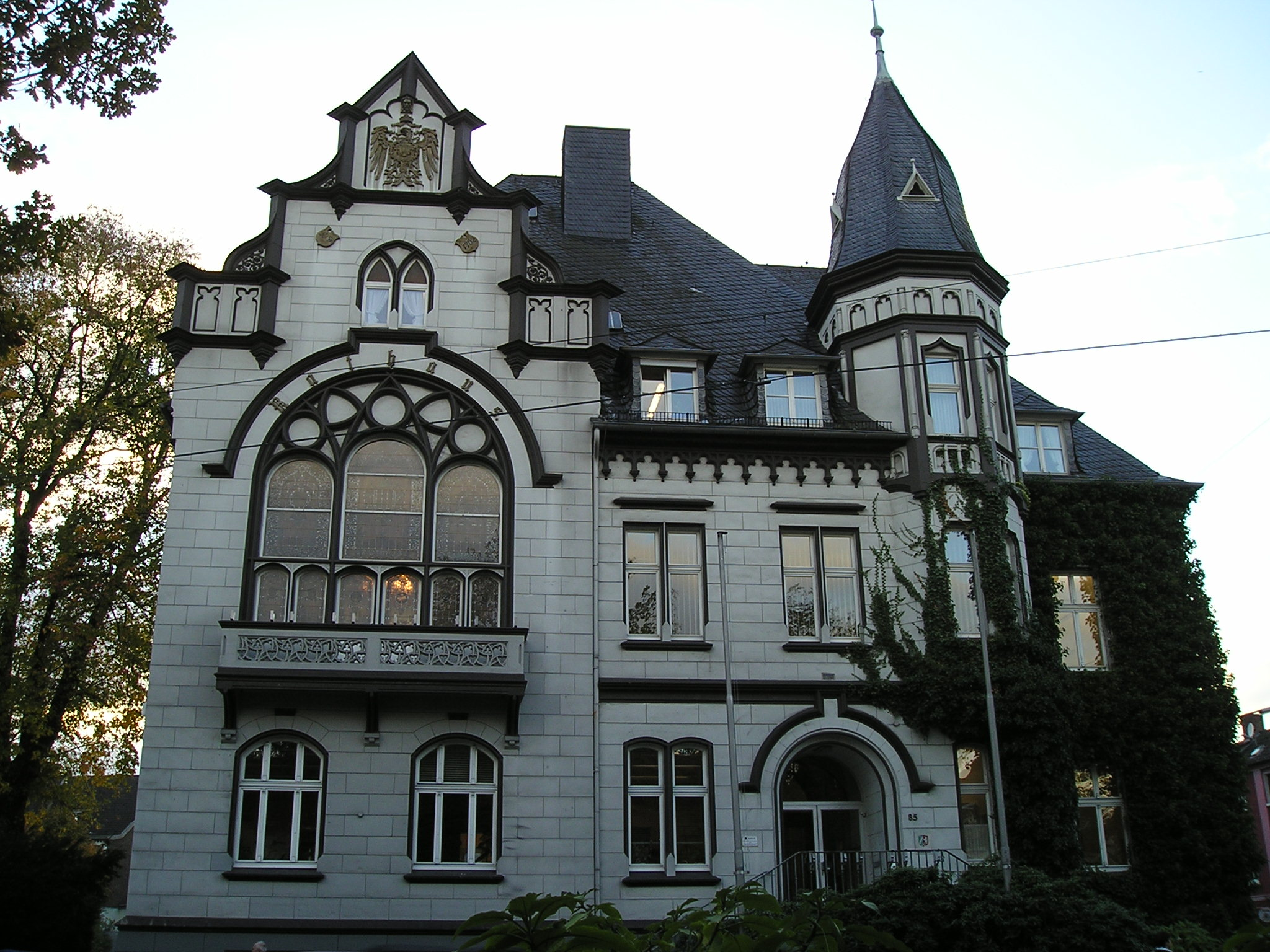
- Town hall

- Coat of arms

- Location of Haan within Mettmann district
- Interactive map of Haan
- Location within Germany Location within North Rhine-Westphalia
- Coordinates: 51°10′N 7°00′E
- Country: Germany
- State: North Rhine-Westphalia
- Admin. region: Düsseldorf
- District: Mettmann
- Subdivisions: 2

Government
  - Mayor (2025–30): Vincent Endereß (CDU)

Area
  - Total: 24.19 km^{2} (9.34 sq mi)
- Elevation: 160 m (520 ft)

Population (2025-12-31)
  - Total: 29,973
  - Density: 1,239/km^{2} (3,209/sq mi)
- Time zone: UTC+01:00 (CET)
  - Summer (DST): UTC+02:00 (CEST)
- Postal codes: 42781
- Dialling codes: 02129, 02104
- Vehicle registration: ME
- Website: www.haan.de

Haan (German pronunciation: [haːn]) is a town in the district of Mettmann, in North Rhine-Westphalia, Germany. It is situated at the western edge of the Bergisches Land, 12 km southwest of Wuppertal and 17 km east of Düsseldorf. In 1975, Gruiten was incorporated into Haan.

== History ==
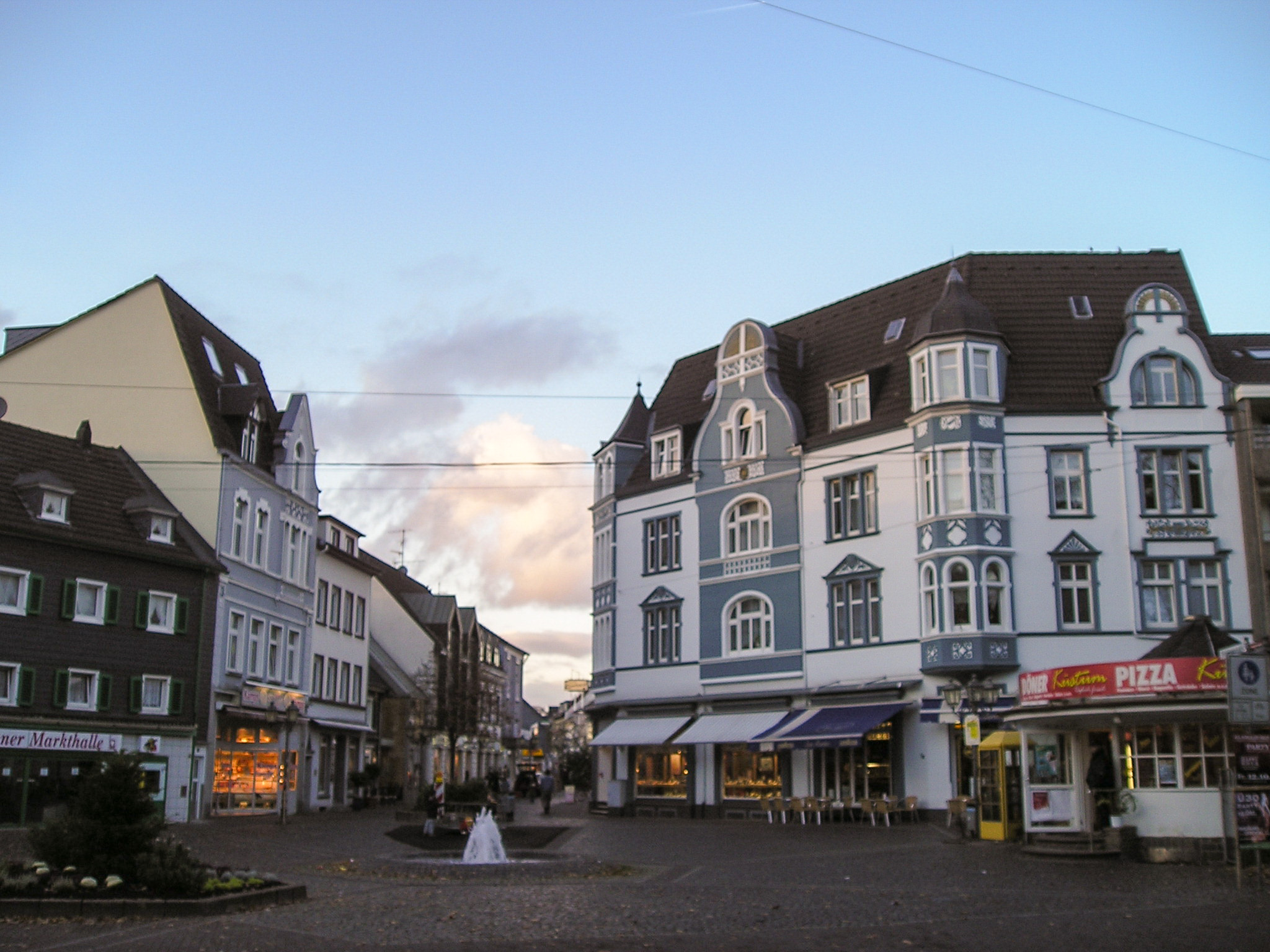
Old market

Haan's origins date back to around 2200 BC. At that time, a hail-shaped settlement was founded in today's city center, which is equipped with a rampart, palisade fence and hedging strips. Accordingly, the name "Haan" should be derived from Hagen, with a reorganization analogous to grove.

From 718 AD Haan was close to the Saxon-Franconian border running between Sonnborn and Elberfeld (both today in Wuppertal). Since today's Kaiserstrasse was a route for the Franconian troops to the east, a marketing system (sutlers) was created in Haan to supply the soldiers.

Even before the early High Middle Ages, Haan belonged to the Archdiocese of Cologne together with Hilden and, even after the formation of the county and later the Duchy of Berg, was initially one of the enclaves within this territorial area. Already around 850, a pre-Romanesque chapel or church was built on the old church square, which Archbishop Wichfried von Köln consecrated in 935. At that time this church was subordinate to the main church in Hilden.

In 1386 the road from Hilden via Haan to Elberfeld, today's federal road 228, was first mentioned in a document. The first evidence of the grinding and weaving trade, which was widespread in Haan until the 20th century, can be dated back to 1589 and 1724 respectively.

In the second half of the 16th century the church of Haan was reformed by the Evangelicals.

Until 1806, Haan, Obgruiten and Gruiten belonged to the Amt Solingen, Ellscheid to the Amt Mettmann within the Duchy of Berg. In 1808, the towns of Haan, Ellscheid, Millrath (today Erkrath), Gruiten, Schöller and Sonnborn (both today Wuppertal) came under French rule and were united to form "Mairie Haan". In 1815 this Mairie was placed under Prussian administration and rededicated to a Prussian mayor's office. [6] At that time, the Mayor's Office (no real office, in German: Bürgermeisterei) of Haan included the following seven special household parishes: Parish Haan, Honschaft Ellscheid, Honschaft Millrath, Honschaft Gruiten, Honschaft Schöller, Honschaft Obgruiten and Kirchspiel Sonnborn.

In 1841, with the completion of the Elberfeld — Gruiten — Düsseldorf railway line, Haan was connected to the ever-expanding rail network. Another connection followed in 1867 with the Ohligs-Gruiten line.

In the same year, Sonnborn retired from the Haan mayor's office (Bürgermeisterei). In 1894, Haan left the mayor's office and Millrath, Gruiten and Schöller henceforth formed the mayor's office which later included Amt Gruiten.

In 1899 Haan got connection to the tram connection from Benrath (today to Düsseldorf) via Hilden to Vohwinkel (today to Wuppertal). City rights were granted to Haan in 1921.

At the turn of 1944/1945, World War II left visible traces in the cityscape when residential areas in Upper and Middle Haan were bombed on New Year's and New Year's Day. 70 people were killed. On April 16, 1945, US-American troops entered Haan, which were replaced by British forces in July 1945.

In 1956, the Catholic parish replaced its neo-Gothic church from 1869 with the modern St. Chrysanthus and Daria church.

Since July 14, 2017, Haan has had the addition of the name "Garden City" to the state of North Rhine-Westphalia in accordance with section 13 (3) of the municipal code. The city had previously described itself as a “garden city”. In the 19th century, deep garden areas were assigned to the residential buildings; Seed trading played an important role in the urban economy.

=== Population ===
Historical population

Year	Pop.	±% p.a.
1965	23,729	—
1970	26,273	+2.06%
1975	27,257	+0.74%
1980	28,570	+0.95%
1985	27,722	−0.60%
1990	29,860	+1.50%
1995	29,888	+0.02%

Year	Pop.	±% p.a.
2000	29,677	−0.14%
2005	29,325	−0.24%
2010	29,149	−0.12%
2015	30,410	+0.85%
2020	30,263	−0.10%
2025	29,973	−0.19%

Source: Landesdatabank Nordrhein-Westfalen

== Twin towns – sister cities ==
Haan is twinned with:

- Eu, France (1967)
- Berwick-upon-Tweed, England, United Kingdom (1982)
- Bad Lauchstädt, Germany (1990)
- Dobrodzień, Poland (2004)

== Economy ==
=== Companies ===
- Emerson Electric Company
- Discher Technik GmbH
- Anlagenbau Stampfer
- Ostermann Furnitures
- Rockwell Automation
- Bohle Group
- Unipol Haan
- Daimler Truck AG
- Verder Scientific

== Notable people ==
- Günter Breithardt (born 1944), cardiologist, pioneer of catheter ablations, professor at University of Münster
- Jonas Carls (born 1997), footballer from FC Schalke 04
- Rahul Peter Das (born 1954), Indologist, professor for South Asian studies at University of Halle-Wittenberg
- Melanie Hoffmann (born 1974), former footballer for SGS Essen
- Walter Huppenkothen (1907–1978), lawyer, high-ranking Nazi official, SS member, SD staff
- Anna Kraft (born 1985), sport journalist and former athlete at TSV Bayer 04 Leverkusen
- Nicole Struse (born 1971), former table tennis player who won several national contests
