= Anna Kraft =

German television presenter

- Born: Anna Katharina Kraft; 3 October 1985 (age 40); Haan, North Rhine-Westphalia, Germany
- Occupation: Television presenter
- Years active: 2010–present (television)
- Website: anna-kraft.tv

Anna Katharina Kraft (born 3 October 1985) is a German television presenter and former athlete.

== Early life and education ==
Anna Kraft was born in Haan in the North Rhine-Westphalia and grew up in the town of Leverkusen where she graduated at the Landrat-Lucas-Gymnasium with her Abitur. During her youth, she was from 2000 to 2008 an athlete at the TSV Bayer 04 Leverkusen. During that time, she was with the multiple German sprint relay champion. By 2005, she studied sports science at the German Sport University Cologne with a degree in media and communication. In 2010, Kraft completed her studies in Cologne and graduated with a sports science diploma.

== Television career ==
Because many injuries prevented on continuing her career in athletics, Kraft already oriented herself during her studies with various internships and collaboration. among others in the sports editorial department of the radio station WDR 2, working in the sports journalism direction and as a television presenter.

In 2010, Kraft became part of the redaction of the football program ran on Sat.1, from where she then moved to Sky Deutschland in December 2011. There, Kraft worked as the youngest presenter on the channel Sky Sport News HD. On 3 July 2013, Kraft was announced at a press conference from Sport1 as the new presenter of the daily football program Bundesliga aktuell. On 19 August 2013, she presented for the last time the program on Sky Sport News HD, then joined the channel Sport1 from September 2013 to June 2015.

In summer 2015, Kraft joined the channel ZDF, where she presents the ZDF sports reportage as well as major sport events there and regularly at the UEFA Champions League and the Bundesliga.

In June 2017, she appeared in the German crime series Die Rosenheim-Cops in the episode "Ausgeritten" broadcast on ZDF.

== Personal life ==
Anna Kraft lives in Munich. She is in a relationship with football commentator Wolff-Christoph Fuss, who works mainly with Sky Deutschland. Her father Heinz-Jürgen played in the late 1950s for Fortuna Düsseldorf and later worked as a coach for VfL Leverkusen and VfB Hilden.

== Filmography ==
- Die Rosenheim-Cops (2017)
