= Golden Bridge (Germany) =

Coordinates: 51°13′41″N 6°46′44″E

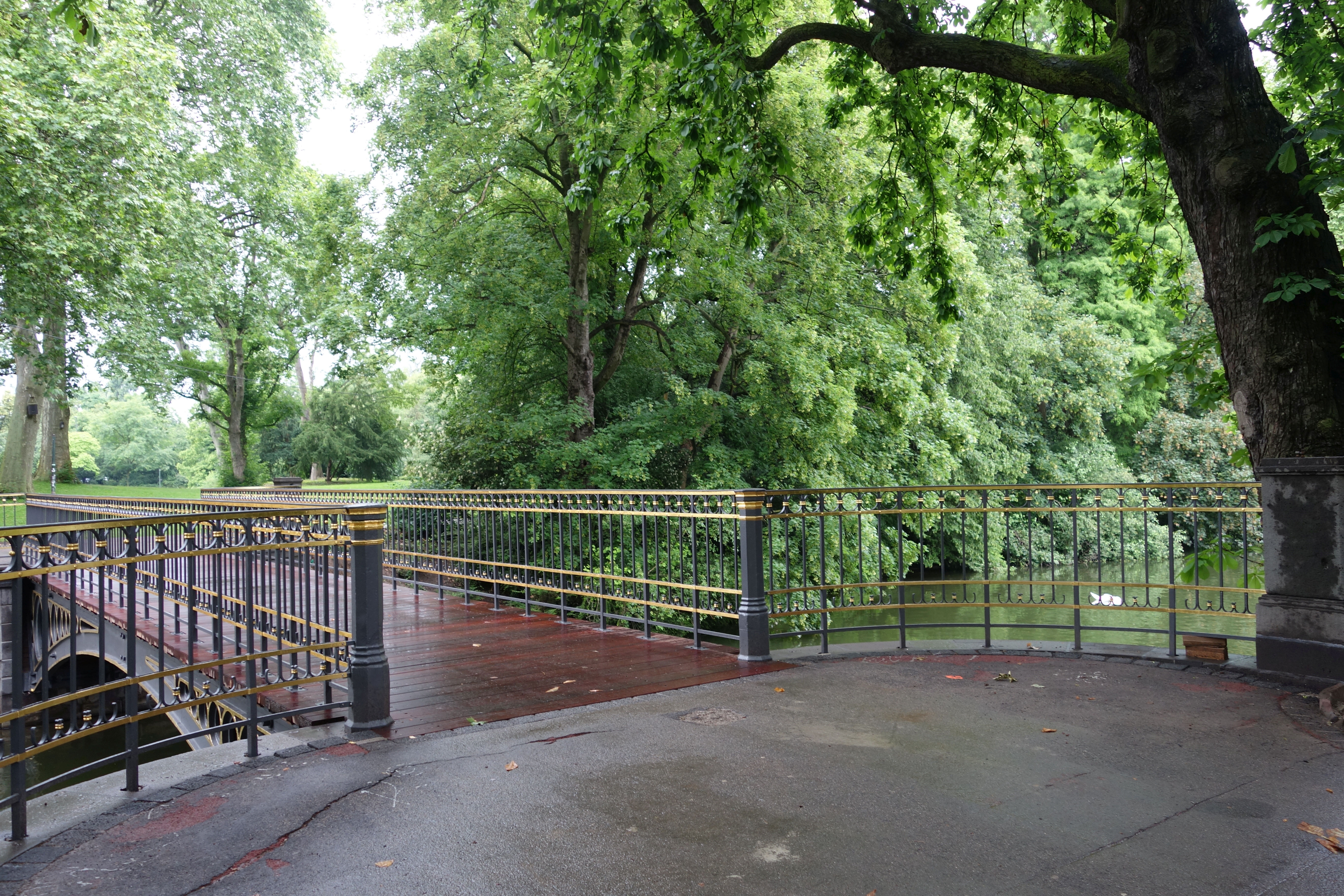
The Golden Bridge after its latest restoration seen in June 2016

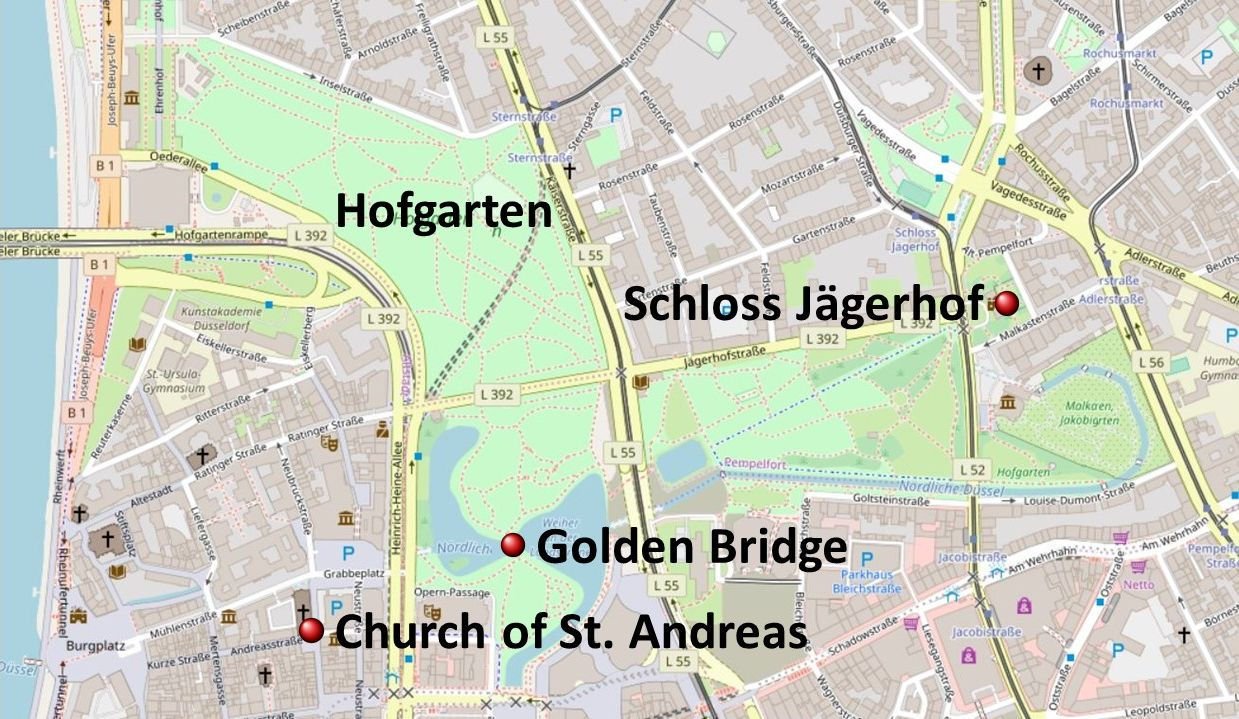
The Golden Bridge within the Hofgarten and the buildings at the end of the former sightline

The Golden Bridge (German: Goldene Brücke) is a 19th-century pedestrian bridge located in the Hofgarten in the borough Stadtmitte of Düsseldorf, Germany. The heritage-listed structure is the city's oldest pedestrian bridge. It bridges the Düssel dammed up there to ponds and crosses a sightline, which once extended over approximately 900 metres (3,000 ft) between Schloss Jägerhof and the Church of St. Andreas.

During the War of the First Coalition, Düsseldorf was occupied by French troops during 1795. The area of the old Hofgarten was occupied by the troops and fortifications built. In 1804, the landscape architect Maximilian Friedrich Weyhe developed a new layout for the area. This saw the Nördliche Düssel, which flows through the Hofgarten, being dammed forming two lakes. In 1809, the narrowing at the boundary of the two lakes was connected by an arched pedestrian bridge. In 1820, the handrails of this original bridge were painted with gold-bronze which gave the bridge its name.

In 1845, the original bridge was replaced with the current bridge, a flat-decked structure to a design by the architect Anton Schnitzler. The steel substructure is partially painted in gold in keeping with its name. The current handrail was installed in 1951. The Golden Bridge was last renovated in 2015. When work started, it was realised that a more complex renovation was needed than had been anticipated, which delayed the reopening to pedestrian and bicycle traffic until June 2016.
