= Goldenbridge =

Goldenbridge may refer to:

- St. Vincent's Industrial School, Goldenbridge, Dublin, Ireland
- Goldenbridge Cemetery, Dublin, Ireland
- Former name of Golden, County Tipperary

== See also ==
- Golden Bridge (disambiguation)
