= Gruiten =

Coordinates: 51°13′30″N 7°00′30″E

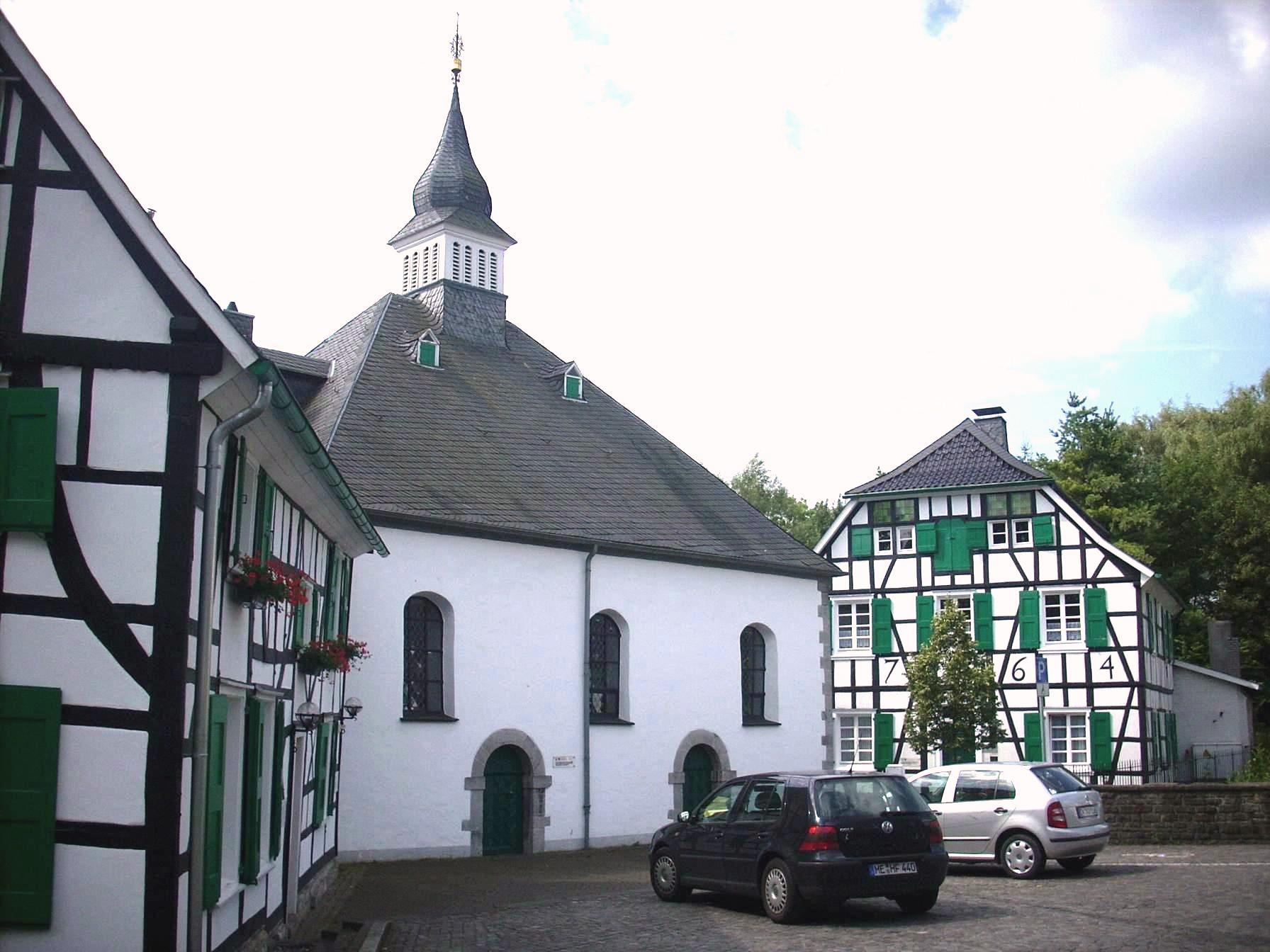
Protestant church with assembly house and preacher's house

Gruiten (German pronunciation: [ˈɡʁyːtn̩]) is a historical village in North Rhine-Westphalia, Germany. Since 1975 it has been part of the town Haan. The village is located on the river Düssel, between Wuppertal and Düsseldorf.
