= Düssel =

River in Germany

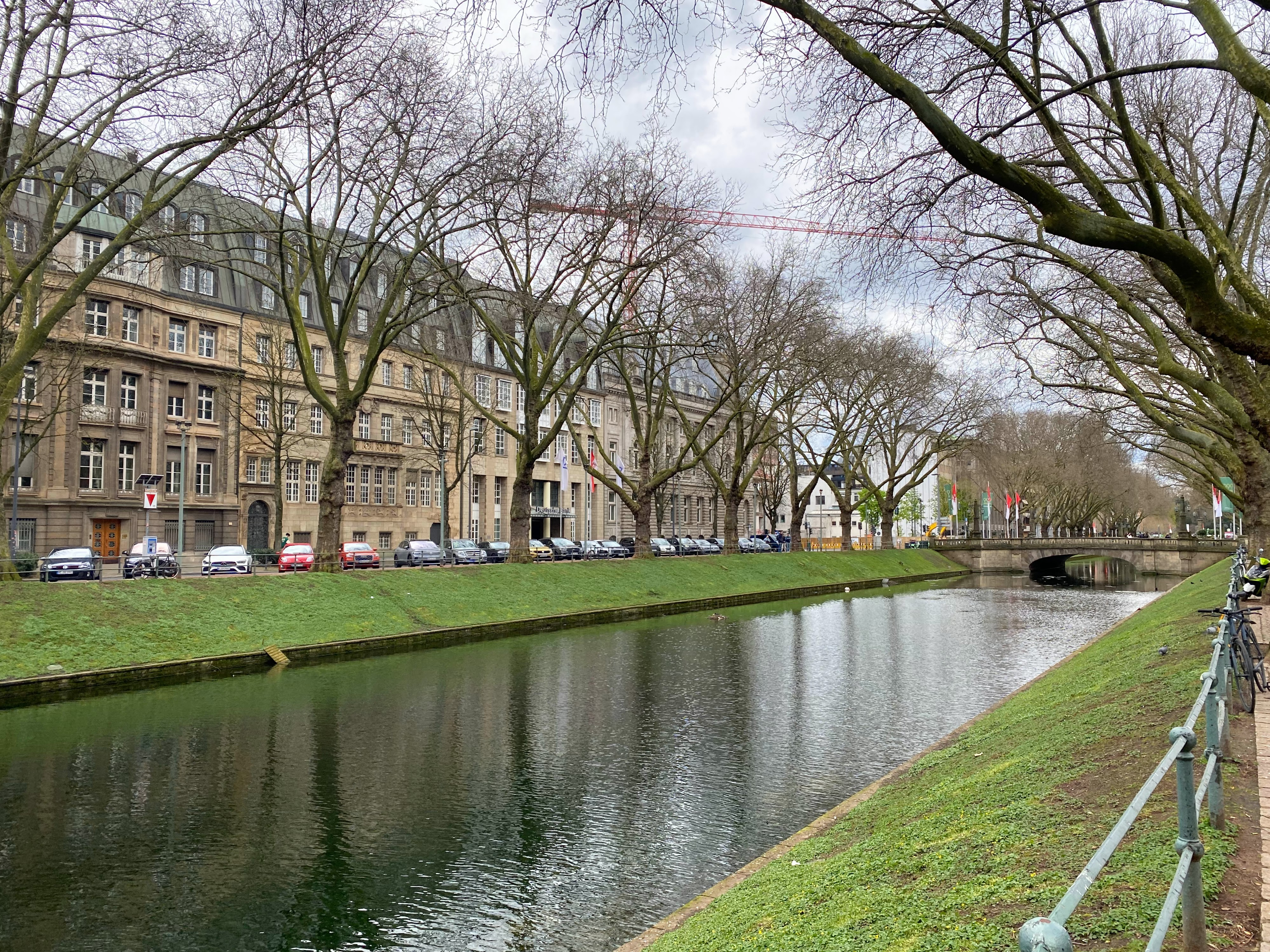
- Königsallee

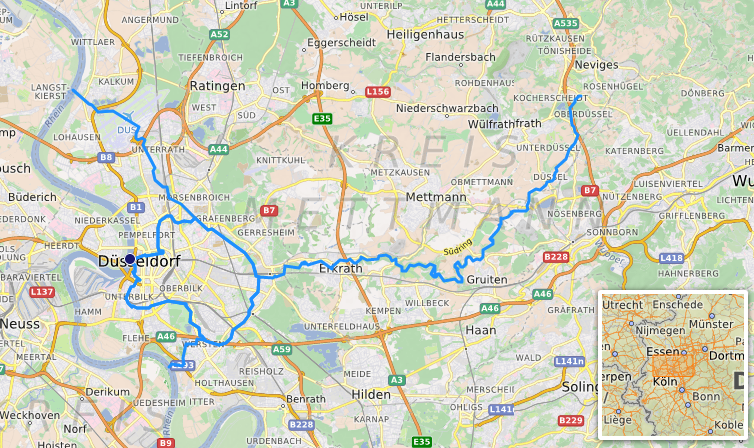
- Path of the Düssel

Location
- Country: Germany
- State: North Rhine-Westphalia

Physical characteristics
- Source
  - location: Bergisches Land
- Mouth
  - location: Rhine
  - coordinates: 51.2271°N 6.7704°E
- Length: 36.0 km (22.4 mi)
- Basin size: 163 km^{2} (63 sq mi)

Basin features
- Progression: Rhine→ North Sea

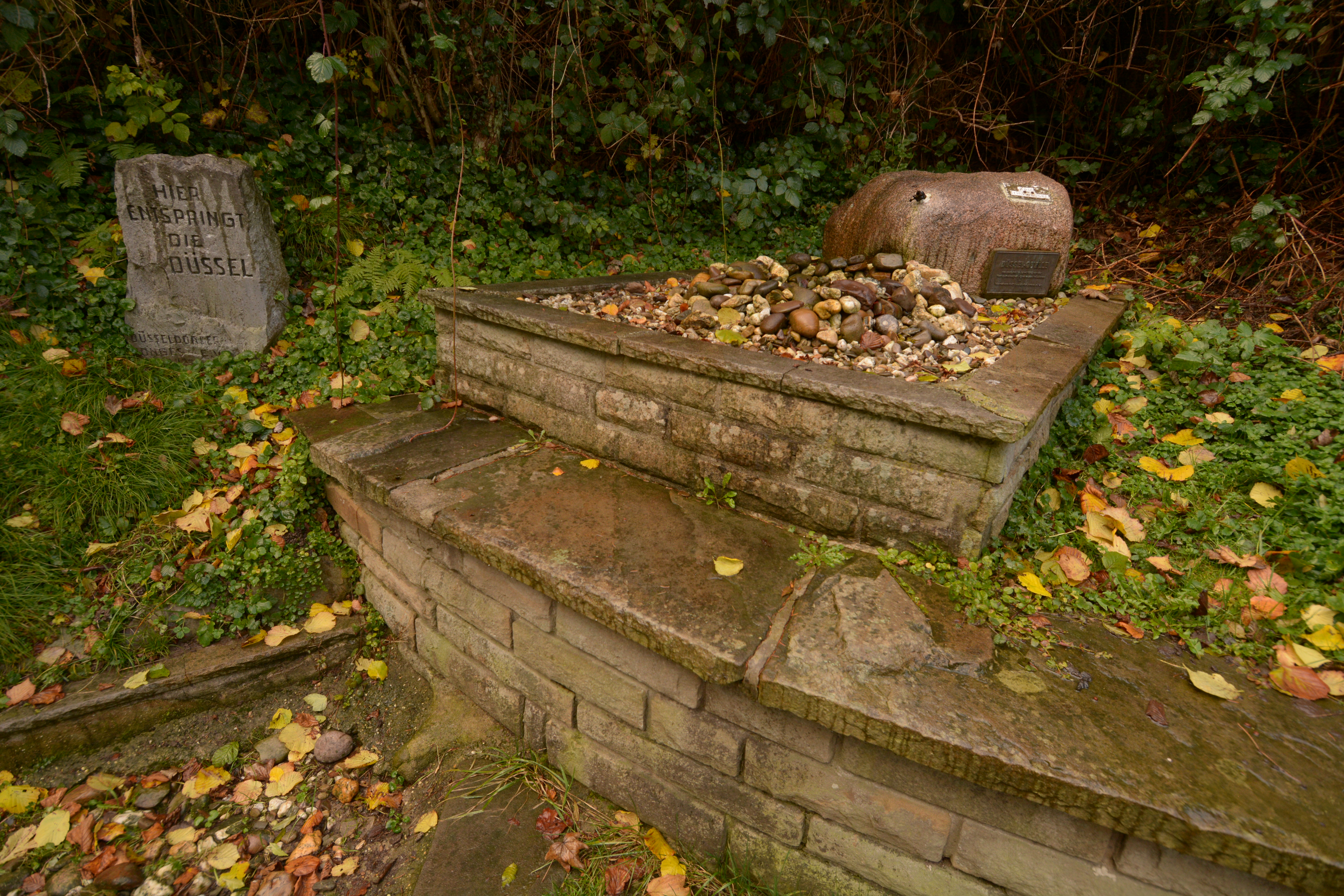
The source of the Düssel in Wülfrath

The Düssel is a small right tributary of the river Rhine in North Rhine Westphalia, Germany.

== River ==
Its source is east of Wülfrath. It flows westward through the Neander Valley where the fossils of the first known to be Neanderthal man were found in August 1856. At Düsseldorf it forms a river delta by splitting into four streams (Nördliche Düssel, Südliche Düssel, Kittelbach, Brückerbach), which all join the Rhine after a few kilometres. The Nördliche Düssel flows through the Hofgarten and passes under the Golden Bridge.

Düsseldorf takes its name from the Düssel: Düsseldorf means "the village of Düssel". The name Düssel itself probably dates back to the Germanic *thusila and means "roar" (Old High German dōsōn, German tosen).

== See also ==
- List of rivers of North Rhine-Westphalia
