= 2008–09 SV Werder Bremen season =

Werder Bremen
2008–09 season
- Head coach: Thomas Schaaf
- Stadium: Weserstadion; Bremen, Bremen
- Bundesliga: 10th
- DFB-Pokal: Winners
- UEFA Champions League: Group stage
- UEFA Cup: Runners-up
- Top goalscorer: League: Claudio Pizarro (17); All: Claudio Pizarro (28)
Home colours	Away colours	Third colours

During the 2008–09 SV Werder Bremen season, the club finished 10th in the Bundesliga, won the DFB-Pokal, and were eliminated in the Group Stage of Champions League, they also finished as runners-up in the final of this season's UEFA Cup, which was also the last competition season to use the UEFA Cup format, before it changed to UEFA Europa League the following season.

== Players ==
=== First-team squad ===
Squad at end of season

Note: Flags indicate national team as defined under FIFA eligibility rules; some limited exceptions apply. Players may hold more than one non-FIFA nationality.

No.	Pos.	Nation	Player
1	GK	GER	Tim Wiese
2	DF	GER	Sebastian Boenisch (Note: Boenisch was born in Gliwice, Poland, but was raised in Germany from the age of 1 and represented Germany at U-20 and U-21 level before making his international debut for Poland in September 2010.)
3	DF	FIN	Petri Pasanen
4	DF	BRA	Naldo
5	DF	SRB	Duško Tošić
6	MF	GER	Frank Baumann
7	MF	CRO	Jurica Vranješ
8	DF	GER	Clemens Fritz
9	FW	SWE	Markus Rosenberg
10	MF	BRA	Diego
11	MF	GER	Mesut Özil
14	MF	GER	Aaron Hunt
15	DF	AUT	Sebastian Prödl

No.	Pos.	Nation	Player
16	MF	GRE	Alexandros Tziolis (on loan from Panathinaikos)
20	MF	DEN	Daniel Jensen
22	MF	GER	Torsten Frings
23	FW	POR	Hugo Almeida
24	FW	PER	Claudio Pizarro (on loan from Chelsea)
25	MF	GER	Peter Niemeyer
27	DF	GER	Niklas Andersen
29	DF	GER	Per Mertesacker
33	GK	GER	Christian Vander
34	FW	AUT	Martin Harnik (Note: Harnik was born in Hamburg, West Germany (now Germany), but also qualified to represent Austria internationally through his father and represented Austria at U-19, U-20, and U-21 level before making his international debut for Austria in August 2007.)
40	GK	GER	Nico Pellatz
45	DF	GER	Timo Perthel
47	FW	GER	Torsten Oehrl

=== Left club during season ===
Note: Flags indicate national team as defined under FIFA eligibility rules; some limited exceptions apply. Players may hold more than one non-FIFA nationality.

No.	Pos.	Nation	Player
17	MF	BIH	Said Husejinović (on loan to Kaiserslautern)
18	FW	CIV	Boubacar Sanogo (on loan to Hoffenheim)

No.	Pos.	Nation	Player
41	DF	GER	Dennis Diekmeier (to Nürnberg)

=== Werder Bremen II ===
Note: Flags indicate national team as defined under FIFA eligibility rules; some limited exceptions apply. Players may hold more than one non-FIFA nationality.

No.	Pos.	Nation	Player
21	GK	GER	Sebastian Mielitz
30	FW	HUN	Márkó Futács
31	MF	GER	Kevin Artmann
32	MF	GER	José-Alex Ikeng (Note: Ikeng was born in Bafia, Cameroon, but also qualified to represent Germany internationally and represented Germany at U-18 level.)

No.	Pos.	Nation	Player
35	DF	FRA	Fabrice Begeorgi (on loan from Marseille)
36	FW	GER	Max Kruse
44	MF	GER	Philipp Bargfrede

== Bundesliga ==
=== Bundesliga results ===
MD	Date Kick–off	Venue	Opponent	Res. F–A	Att.	Goalscorers and disciplined players		Table			Ref.
MD	Date Kick–off	Venue	Opponent	Res. F–A	Att.	Werder Bremen	Opponent	Pos.	Pts.	GD	Ref.
1											
2											
3											
4											
5											
6											
7											
8											
9											
10											
11											
12											
13											
14											
15											
16											
17											
18											
19											
20											
21											
22											
23											
24											
25											
26											
27											
28											
29											
30											
31											
32											
33											
34											

=== Results summary ===
Overall								Home						Away					
Pld	W	D	L	GF	GA	GD	Pts	W	D	L	GF	GA	GD	W	D	L	GF	GA	GD
34	12	9	13	64	50	+14	45	10	4	3	43	22	+21	2	5	10	21	28	−7

Last updated: 18 August 2014.

=== League table ===
Pos	Team	Pld	W	D	L	GF	GA	GD	Pts	Qualification or relegation
8	Schalke 04	34	14	8	12	47	35	+12	50	
9	Bayer Leverkusen	34	14	7	13	59	46	+13	49	
10	Werder Bremen (Note: Werder Bremen qualified for the play-off round of the UEFA Europa League by winning the 2008–09 DFB-Pokal.)	34	12	9	13	64	50	+14	45	Qualification to Europa League play-off round
11	Hannover 96	34	10	10	14	49	69	−20	40	
12	1. FC Köln	34	11	6	17	35	50	−15	39	

Source: kicker (in German)
Rules for classification: 1) points; 2) goal difference; 3) number of goals scored.

== DFB–Pokal ==
=== DFB–Pokal review ===
In the first round of the DFB-Pokal, on 17 August, Werder Bremen defeated Oberliga club Eintracht Nordhorn 9–3. Werder Bremen got four goals from Markus Rosenberg, three goals from Hugo Almeida, and two more goals from Boubacar Sanogo and Jurica Vranješ. Dennis Brode, Herion Novaku, and Bertino Nacar scored for Eintracht Nordhorn. Then in the second round, on 23 September, Werder Bremen defeated 3. Liga club Erzgebirge Aue 2–1. Fabian Müller gave Erzgebirge Aue a 1–0 lead in the seventh minute. However, Werder Bremen equalized with a 26-minute goal from Claudio Pizarro and took the lead with a 54-minute goal from Markus Rosenberg. Then in the round of 16, on 28 January, Werder Bremen defeated Borussia Dortmund 2–1.

=== DFB–Pokal results ===
Rd	Date Kick–off	Venue	Opponent	Res. F–A	Att.	Goalscorers and disciplined players		Ref.
Rd	Date Kick–off	Venue	Opponent	Res. F–A	Att.	Werder Bremen	Opponent	Ref.
FR	17 August; 15:30	A	Eintracht Nordhorn	9–3	9,000	Rosenberg 6', 31', 54', 73'; Almeida 15', 22', 50'; Sanogo 71'; Vranješ 74'	Brode 37'; Novaku 81'; Nacar 90'	
SR	23 September; 19:00	A	Erzgebirge Aue	2–1	12,000	Pizarro 26'; Rosenberg 54'	Müller 7'; Schmidt (yellow card) 40'; Paulus (yellow card) 56'; Kos (yellow card) 90'	
R16	28 January; 19:00	H	Borussia Dortmund	2–1	74,000			
QF	4 March; 19:00	A	VfL Wolfsburg	5–2				
SF	22 April; 20:30	A	Hamburger SV	1–1	55,237			
SF	22 April; 20:30	A	Hamburger SV	Shoot–out score		Shoot–out		
SF	22 April; 20:30	A	Hamburger SV	3–1				
F	30 May; 20:00	N	Bayer Leverkusen	1–0				

== Champions League ==
=== Champions League review ===
Werder Bremen kicked–off their Champions League campaign with a 0–0 draw against Anorthosis Famagusta on 16 September.

=== Champions League results ===
MD	Date Kick–off	Venue	Opponent	Res. F–A	Att.	Goalscorers and disciplined players		Table			Ref.
MD	Date Kick–off	Venue	Opponent	Res. F–A	Att.	Werder Bremen	Opponent	Pos.	Pts.	GD	Ref.
1	16 September; 20:45	H	Anorthosis Famagusta	0–0					1	0	
2	1 October; 20:45	A	Inter Milan	1–1					2	0	
3	22 October; 20:45	A	Panathinaikos	2–2					3	0	
4	4 November; 20:45	H	Panathinaikos	0–3					3	–3	
5	26 November; 20:45	A	Anorthosis Famagusta	2–2					4	–3	
6	9 December; 20:45	H	Inter Milan	2–1					7	–2	

=== Group table ===
Pos	Team	Pld	W	D	L	GF	GA	GD	Pts	Qualification
1	(Greece) Panathinaikos	6	3	1	2	8	7	+1	10	Advance to knockout phase
2	(Italy) Internazionale	6	2	2	2	8	7	+1	8	Advance to knockout phase
3	(Germany) Werder Bremen	6	1	4	1	7	9	−2	7	Transfer to UEFA Cup
4	(Cyprus) Anorthosis Famagusta	6	1	3	2	8	8	0	6	

Source: RSSSF

Overall								Home						Away					
Pld	W	D	L	GF	GA	GD	Pts	W	D	L	GF	GA	GD	W	D	L	GF	GA	GD
6	1	4	1	7	9	−2	7	1	1	1	2	4	−2	0	3	0	5	5	0

Last updated: 20 August 2014.
Source: Champions League results

== UEFA Cup ==
=== UEFA Cup results ===
Leg	Date kick–off	Venue	Opponent	Res. F–A	Agg. score F–A	Att.	Goalscorers and disciplined players		Ref.
Leg	Date kick–off	Venue	Opponent	Res. F–A	Agg. score F–A	Att.	Werder Bremen	Opponent	Ref.
Second round
FL	18 February; 20:30	H	Milan	1–1	—				
SL	26 February; 20:45	A	Milan	2–2	3–3				
Round of 16
FL	12 March; 20:30	H	Saint-Étienne	1–0	—				
SL	18 March; 20:30	A	Saint-Étienne	2–2	3–2				
Quarter–final
FL	9 April; 20:45	H	Udinese	3–1	—				
SL	16 April; 20:45	A	Udinese	3–3	6–4				
Semi–final
FL	30 April; 20:45	H	Hamburger SV	0–1	—				
SL	7 May; 20:45	A	Hamburger SV	3–2	3–3				
Final
—	20 May; 20:45	N	Shakhtar Donetsk	1–2	—				

== Team record ==
Competition	First match	Last match	Record								
Competition	First match	Last match	M	W	D	L	GF	GA	GD	Win %	Ref.
Bundesliga	16 August	23 May	34	12	9	13	64	50	+14	35.29	
DFB-Pokal	17 August	30 May	6	5	1	0	20	8	+12	83.33	DFB–Pokal results
Champions League	16 September	9 December	6	1	4	1	7	9	−2	16.67	Champions League results
UEFA Cup	18 February	20 May	9	3	4	2	16	14	+2	33.33	UEFA Cup results
Total			55	21	18	16	107	81	+26	38.18	—

== Player information ==
=== Squad and statistics ===
Player	Total		Bundesliga		DFB-Pokal		Champions League		UEFA Cup		Ref.
Player	App.	Gls	App.	Gls	App.	Gls	App.	Gls	App.	Gls	Ref.
Goalkeepers
Tim Wiese	46	0	29	0	5	0	4	0	8	0	
Christian Vander	8	0	5	0	0	0	2	0	1	0	
Nico Pellatz	1	0	0	0	1	0	0	0	0	0	
Defenders
Niklas Andersen	1	0	1	0	0	0	0	0	0	0	
Sebastian Boenisch	42	0	24	0	5	0	4	0	9	0	
Clemens Fritz	42	0	24	0	6	0	5	0	7	0	
Per Mertesacker	39	4	23	2	3	1	6	1	7	0	
Naldo	47	5	28	3	5	0	5	0	9	2	
Petri Pasanen	27	0	16	0	3	0	3	0	5	0	
Timo Perthel	1	0	1	0	0	0	0	0	0	0	
Sebastian Prödl	33	0	22	0	3	0	4	0	4	1	
Duško Tošić	11	0	9	0	1	0	1	0	0	0	
Midfielders
Frank Baumann	39	2	27	1	4	0	4	0	4	1	
Diego	39	21	21	12	5	2	5	1	8	6	
Torsten Frings	48	4	30	4	5	0	5	0	8	0	
Aaron Hunt	28	2	18	2	2	0	4	0	4	0	
Said Husejinović	3	0	3	0	0	0	0	0	0	0	
Daniel Jensen	19	0	11	0	2	0	3	0	3	0	
Peter Niemeyer	25	0	15	0	4	0	1	0	5	0	
Mesut Özil	47	5	28	3	5	2	6	0	8	0	
Alexandros Tziolis	27	1	15	1	4	0	0	0	8	0	
Jurica Vranješ	18	1	14	0	2	1	2	0	0	0	
Forwards
Martin Harnik	9	0	8	0	0	0	01	0	1	0	
Torsten Oehrl	1	0	1	0	0	0	0	0	0	0	
Claudio Pizarro	46	28	26	17	5	4	6	2	9	5	
Markus Rosenberg	47	13	29	7	5	5	6	1	7	0	
Boubacar Sanogo	26	3	22	2	1	1	3	0	0	0	

=== Discipline ===
Player	Total			Bundesliga			DFB-Pokal			Champions League			UEFA Cup			Ref.
Player	Yellow card	(yellow card) (red card)	Red card	Yellow card	(yellow card) (red card)	Red card	Yellow card	(yellow card) (red card)	Red card	Yellow card	(yellow card) (red card)	Red card	Yellow card	(yellow card) (red card)	Red card	Ref.
Tim Wiese	2	0	0	1	0	0	1	0	0	0	0	0	0	0	0	
Sebastian Boenisch	7	0	0	5	0	0	0	0	0	0	0	0	2	0	0	
Clemens Fritz	8	0	0	5	0	0	0	0	0	1	0	0	2	0	0	
Per Mertesacker	2	0	1	0	0	1	1	0	0	0	0	0	1	0	0	
Naldo	6	0	1	3	0	1	2	0	0	0	0	0	1	0	0	
Petri Pasanen	5	0	0	3	0	0	2	0	0	0	0	0	0	0	0	
Sebastian Prödl	6	0	0	4	0	0	1	0	0	1	0	0	0	0	0	
Duško Tošić	2	0	0	1	0	0	0	0	0	1	0	0	0	0	0	
Frank Baumann	7	0	0	4	0	0	0	0	0	2	0	0	1	0	0	
Diego	10	0	0	4	0	0	1	0	0	3	0	0	2	0	0	
Torsten Frings	14	0	0	5	0	0	2	0	0	5	0	0	2	0	0	
Aaron Hunt	4	0	0	4	0	0	0	0	0	0	0	0	0	0	0	
Daniel Jensen	5	0	0	3	0	0	0	0	0	1	0	0	1	0	0	
Peter Niemeyer	4	0	0	3	0	0	1	0	0	0	0	0	0	0	0	
Mesut Özil	3	0	1	1	0	1	0	0	0	1	0	0	1	0	0	
Alexandros Tziolis	5	0	0	2	0	0	0	0	0	0	0	0	3	0	0	
Jurica Vranješ	1	0	0	1	0	0	0	0	0	0	0	0	0	0	0	
Claudio Pizarro	3	0	1	2	0	1	0	0	0	0	0	0	1	0	0	
Markus Rosenberg	5	0	0	2	0	0	1	0	0	1	0	0	1	0	0	
Boubacar Sanogo	1	0	0	1	0	0	0	0	0	0	0	0	0	0	0	
Totals	100	0	4	54	0	4	12	0	0	16	0	0	18	0	0	—
