= 2007–08 SV Werder Bremen season =

SV Werder Bremen
2007–08 season
- Manager: Thomas Schaaf
- Stadium: Weser-Stadion
- Bundesliga: 2nd
- DFB-Pokal: Round of 16
- UEFA Champions League: Group stage
- UEFA Cup: Round of 16
- Top goalscorer: League: Markus Rosenberg (14); All: Diego (18)
Home colours	Away colours	Third colours

During the 2007–08 German football season, Werder Bremen competed in the Bundesliga.

== Special kits ==
4º 2007–08

== Season summary ==
Bremen failed to make a splash in European competition, being knocked out of the Champions League in the group stage before being eliminated from the UEFA Cup at the round of 16. There was better luck domestically, as the club finished runners-up.

== Players ==
=== First-team squad ===
Squad at end of season

Note: Flags indicate national team as defined under FIFA eligibility rules; some limited exceptions apply. Players may hold more than one non-FIFA nationality.

No.	Pos.	Nation	Player
1	GK	GER	Tim Wiese
2	DF	GER	Sebastian Boenisch (Note: Boenisch was born in Gliwice, Poland, but was raised in Germany from the age of 1 and represented Germany at U-20 and U-21 level before making his international debut for Poland in September 2010.)
3	DF	FIN	Petri Pasanen
4	DF	BRA	Naldo
5	DF	CMR	Pierre Womé
6	MF	GER	Frank Baumann
7	MF	CRO	Jurica Vranješ
8	DF	GER	Clemens Fritz
9	FW	SWE	Markus Rosenberg
10	MF	BRA	Diego
11	MF	GER	Mesut Özil
13	DF	SRB	Duško Tošić
14	MF	GER	Aaron Hunt
15	DF	GER	Patrick Owomoyela
17	FW	CRO	Ivan Klasnić (Note: Klasnić was born in Hamburg, West Germany, but also qualified to represent Croatia internationally and represented Croatia at U-19 and U-21 level before making his international debut for Croatia in February 2004.)
18	FW	CIV	Boubacar Sanogo

No.	Pos.	Nation	Player
20	MF	DEN	Daniel Jensen
21	GK	GER	Sebastian Mielitz
22	MF	GER	Torsten Frings
23	FW	POR	Hugo Almeida
24	MF	GER	Tim Borowski
25	MF	GER	Peter Niemeyer
26	DF	GER	Florian Mohr
28	MF	GER	Kevin Schindler
29	DF	GER	Per Mertesacker
31	MF	GER	Kevin Artmann
33	GK	GER	Christian Vander
34	MF	AUT	Martin Harnik (Note: Harnik was born in Hamburg, West Germany, but also qualified to represent Austria internationally through his father and represented Austria at U-19, U-20, and U-21 level before making his international debut for Austria in August 2007.)
36	FW	GER	Max Kruse
37	FW	GER	Frank Löning
38	MF	POR	Amaury Bischoff (Note: Bischoff was born in Colmar, France, and represented them at U-18 level, but also qualified to represent Portugal internationally through his mother and represented Portugal at U-21 level.)
40	GK	GER	Nico Pellatz

=== Left club during season ===
Note: Flags indicate national team as defined under FIFA eligibility rules; some limited exceptions apply. Players may hold more than one non-FIFA nationality.

No.	Pos.	Nation	Player
16	MF	DEN	Leon Andreasen (to Fulham)
19	MF	BRA	Carlos Alberto (on loan to São Paulo)
27	DF	GER	Christian Schulz (to Hannover 96)

No.	Pos.	Nation	Player
27	FW	COL	John Mosquera (on loan to Alemannia Aachen)
39	MF	GER	Norman Theuerkauf (to Eintracht Frankfurt II)
