= Sebastian Boenisch =

Polish footballer (born 1987)

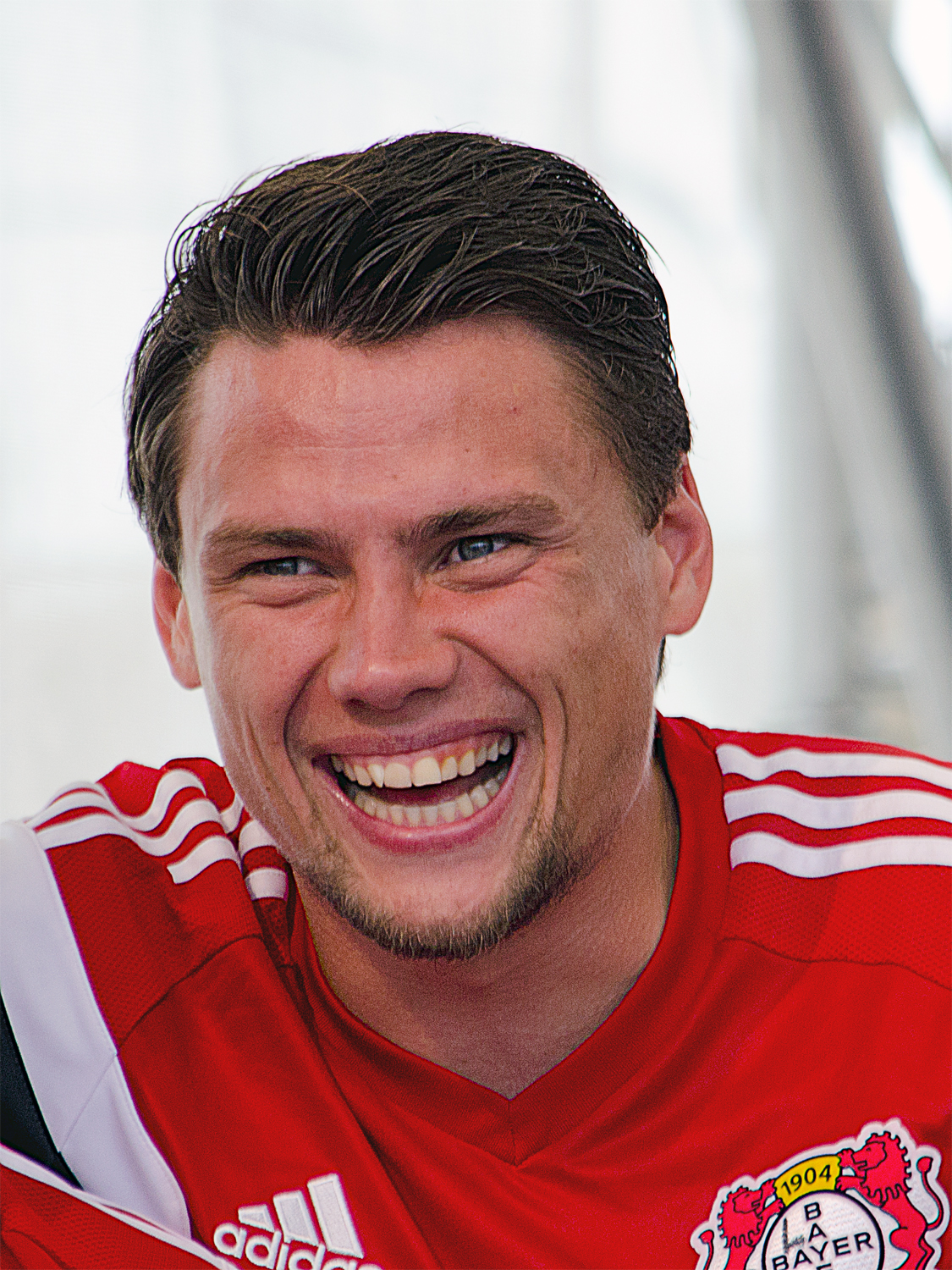
- Sebastian Boenisch in 2015

Personal information
- Birth name: Sebastian Pniowski
- Date of birth: 1 February 1987 (age 39)
- Place of birth: Gliwice, Poland
- Height: 1.91 m (6 ft 3 in)
- Position: Full-back

Youth career
- 1992–2000: SSVG 09/12 Heiligenhaus
- 2000–2001: Borussia Velbert
- 2001–2003: Rot-Weiß Oberhausen
- 2003–2006: Schalke 04

Senior career*
Years	Team	Apps	(Gls)
2005–2007	Schalke 04 II	14	(0)
2006–2007	Schalke 04	9	(0)
2007–2012	Werder Bremen	55	(1)
2011–2012	Werder Bremen II	3	(1)
2012	Bayer Leverkusen II	1	(0)
2012–2016	Bayer Leverkusen	60	(3)
2016–2017	1860 Munich	14	(0)
2019–2020	Floridsdorfer AC	8	(0)
2020	Wiener Neustadt	2	(0)

International career
2006–2007	Germany U20	4	(0)
2007–2009	Germany U21	13	(0)
2010–2013	Poland	14	(0)
Medal record
Men's football
Representing Germany
UEFA European Under-21 Championship
Winner	2009 Sweden
- * Club domestic league appearances and goals

Sebastian Boenisch (Polish: [sɛˈbastjan ˈbɛɲiʂ], German: [zeˈbasti̯a(ː)n ˈbøːnɪʃ]; né Pniowski [ˈpɲɔfskʲi]; born 1 February 1987) is a Polish former professional footballer who played as a full-back.

At international level, he made 14 appearances for the Polish national team between 2010 and 2013.

== Early career ==
Boenisch was born in Gliwice in Upper Silesia. His great-grandfather was of German descent. In 1988, he emigrated with his family and after a time in Dortmund, the family settled in Heiligenhaus in Niederbergisches Land in Bergisches Land in North Rhine-Westphalia. Boenisch previously had a surname of Pniowski before the family changed it to Boenisch at the recommendation of the German civil service. Despite being born in Poland, he is not fluent in Polish and speaks German and Silesian. He attended the Gesamtschule Berger Feld.

Boenisch's parents are athletes, his mother played handball and his father played football.

== Club career ==
=== Schalke 04 ===
Boenisch started his football career by joining SSVG 09/12 Heiligenhaus. He then moved to different clubs like Borussia Velbert and Rot-Weiß Oberhausen before joining Schalke 04 at age sixteen and signing a professional contract with the club in January 2006. After three years at the club's reserve, Boenisch made his professional debut for Schalke 04 on 11 February 2006, coming on as a substitute in the 86th minute, in a 7–4 home win against Bayer 04 Leverkusen. A few weeks later, Boenisch was featured in the first team again in a 2–1 win against Espanyol in the UEFA Cup.

For the next two seasons, Boenisch was never considered for the first team, having spent time playing for the reserve and being an un-used substitute in the first team. Towards the end of the 2006–07 season, he signed a new deal at Schalke, that would have kept him until 2010. However, two months later after signing a new contract, Boenisch had enough of being left out of the club's starting lineup and announced his intention to leave the club.

=== Werder Bremen ===
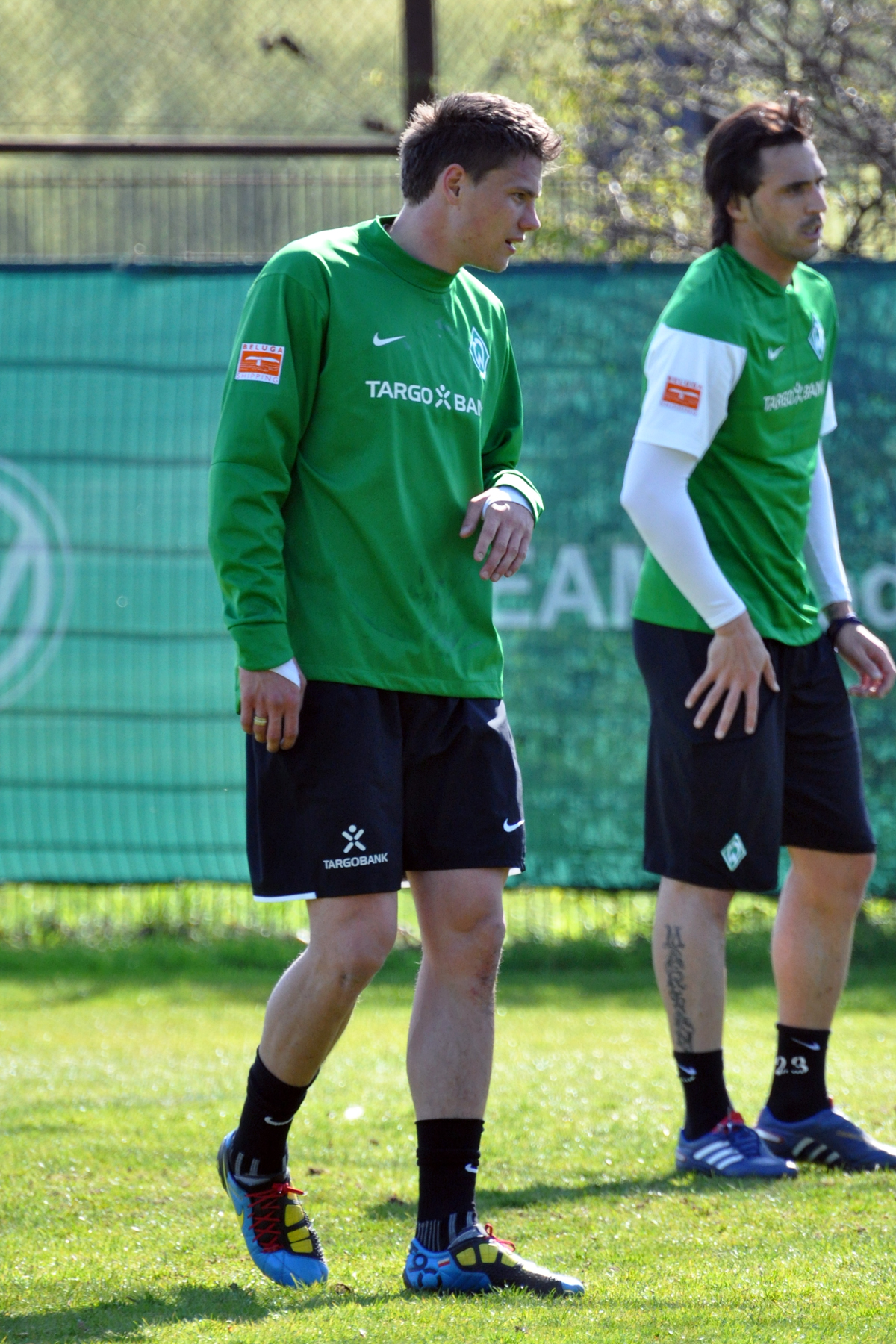
Boenisch during Werder Bremen's training on 23 April 2010.

On 1 September 2007, he moved to Werder Bremen on an undisclosed fee, believed to be around €3 million and signed a four-year deal that would last until 2011. Four months after signing for Werder Bremen, he was joined by Schalke teammate Mesut Özil, who suffered the same fate as Boenisch.

He made his debut for the club, coming on as a substitute for Duško Tošić in the 80th minute, as Werder Bremen won 2–1 against Eintracht Frankfurt. Soon after, Boenisch suffered a knee injury during a U21 match when he represented Germany, After a month's layoff, Boenisch made a return from injury, on 16 February 2008, coming on as a substitute in the 84th minute for Aaron Hunt, in a 2–0 win over Nürnberg. Three weeks after his return, he scored his first goal for the club, in a 6–3 loss against Stuttgart on 8 March 2008. He returned to the starting line-up throughout March and was criticised by the club's fans for passing the ball to opposition player. However, it was short-lived when he suffered a hamstring injury that made him missing the rest of the season, although he was an unused substitute in the final game of the season. Boenisch finished his first season at Werder Bremen, making nine appearances and scoring once.

The 2008–09 season saw a setback when Boenisch suffered an injury ahead of a new season. He became a regular in the first team and spent most of the season in the left-back position, competing the position with Petri Pasanen. Boenisch then made his UEFA Champions League debut, making his first start, in a 0–0 draw against Cypriot side Anorthosis Famagusta. In a match against Borussia Dortmund on 18 October 2008, Boenisch provided two of the three goals in a 3–3 draw. Despite suffering from injuries, Boenisch, who played all nine UEFA Cup league matches, played the whole 120 minutes of the game and was booked for dissent in the 2009 UEFA Cup Final to level the game at 1–1, however his team went on to lose the game 2–1 to Shakhtar Donetsk after extra time. Nevertheless, the club would win the DFB-Pokal after beating Bayer Leverkusen 1–0; this was Boenisch's first title in his career.

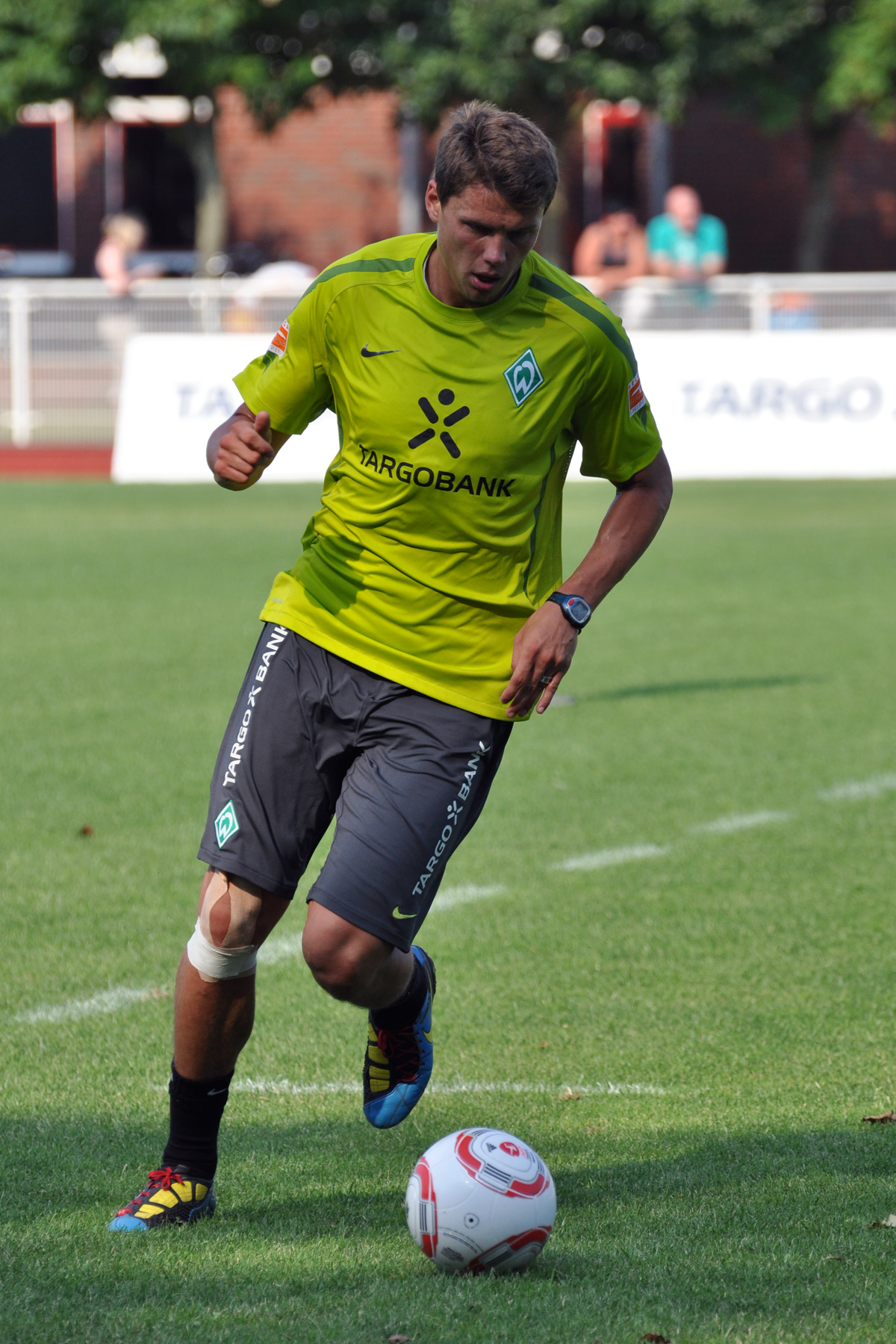
Sebastian Boenisch during Werder Bremen's training on 11 July 2010.

The 2009–10 season saw Boenisch missing the opening game of the season due to a back injury. Boenisch had previously suffered an ankle ligament in the 2009 European Under-21 Championship campaign After making a return the next league game, he scored his first goal of the season in a qualification round of Europa League, in a 6–3 win over Aktobe. In December, Boenisch suffered an injury again – after a collision with Carlos Zambrano, resulting him suffering a knee injury that kept him out for months. He made his return, three months later, in a 3–2 win over Bochum on 20 March 2010. As in the previous season, Werder Bremen made it to the final in the DFB-Pokal. Boenisch started in the final, but Bremen lost 4–0 against Bayern Munich. Towards the end of the season, Boenisch was in talks on signing a new contract extension with the club.

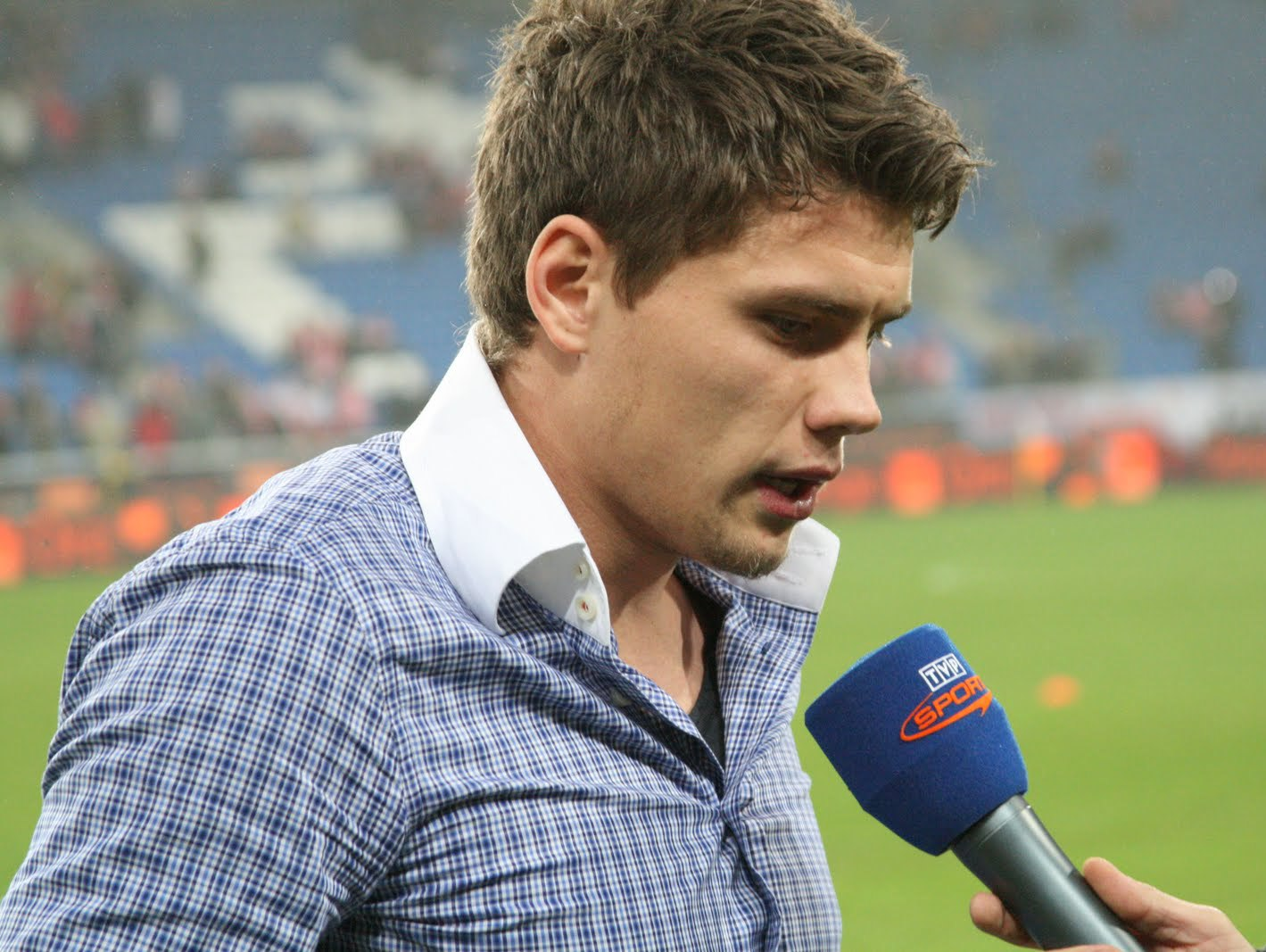
Boenisch being interviewed by TVP Sport in November 2010.

After appearing four times for Bremen's first team throughout August and early September, Boenisch suffered a knee injury that kept him out for six months. In March, he made a return from injury, but his injury soon aggravated and he missed the rest of the season. In April, after long talk of negotiations of a contract extension, Boenisch finally signed a new deal that would keep him until 2012.

In the 2011–12 season, Boenisch announced he expected to make a comeback in the second half of the league season. In mid-November, Boenisch made a recovery from injury and returned to training. In January, he made a return playing for the club's reserve. Injuries struck again twice but he made a successful recovery. Boenisch made his first appearance since being injured coming on as a substitute in the 78th minute in a 1–1 draw against Augsburg on 24 March 2012. In a 2–2 draw against Borussia Mönchengladbach on 10 April 2012, Boenisch received a straight red card early in the game and missed two matches. At the end of the 2011–12 season, Boenisch left the club, ending his five-year association with the club, and became a free agent after rejecting a contract with the club.

After leaving Werder Bremen, Boenisch was linked with a move to Stuttgart and was even offered a new contract by them. However, the club withdrew their contract offer to sign Boenisch following his poor performance during the UEFA Euro 2012 campaign, citing lack of performance as the reason for their action. On 6 August 2012, Boenisch was handed a trial at English Premier League side Stoke City and started a pre-season friendly for the club against Torquay United and Yeovil Town. His trial was unsuccessful and he was not offered a contract by Stoke. Boenisch told kreiszeitung.de that the rejection of Stoke City left him "bewildered".

=== Bayer Leverkusen ===
In late October 2012, Boenisch went on a trial with Fortuna Düsseldorf, but on 4 November 2012, he joined Bayer 04 Leverkusen on a six-month spell, which angered Fortuna Düsseldorf who expected him to join them.

Boenisch made his Bayer Leverkusen debut, playing 45 minutes, in a 3–1 loss against Wolfsburg on 11 November 2012. Following good appearances, including his first goal against Eintracht Frankfurt on 19 January 2013, he signed a new contract with the Werkself on 4 February 2013 until June 2016. When Bayer Leverkusen and Fortuna Düsseldorf met for the second time in the league this season, Boenisch was accused of being a spy by financial Boss Paul Jäger, a claim denied by Boenisch. He went on to finish the season, making 15 appearances and scoring once.

The 2013–14 season saw Boenisch became a first team regular in the left back position. However, Boenisch suffered a tendon injury that ruled him throughout 2013. After making his first team return against Freiburg on 25 January 2014, Boenisch, once again, was sidelined when he suffered a lumbago. After missing out two matches, Boenisch played again on 15 February 2014, in a 2–1 loss against Schalke 04. Boenisch managed to regain his first team place and then scored his first goal of the season and set up one of the goals in a 4–1 win over Nürnberg on 20 April 2014. Boenisch later finished the season, making 25 appearances and scoring once.

In the opening game of the 2014–15 season against Borussia Dortmund, Boenisch set up a goal for Karim Bellarabi who scored the fastest goal in Bundesliga history in just 9 seconds in a 2–0 win. However, Boenisch suffered an injury that kept him out throughout October. Boenisch made his first team return on 22 November 2014, in a 3–1 win over Hannover 96 Even after returning from an injury, Boenisch was sitting on the substitute bench for most of the season, due to the good performance of Wendell.

The 2015–16 season continuously saw Boenisch on the substitute bench. He made his first appearance, playing 12 minutes, in a 3–0 loss against Bayern Munich on 29 August 2015. On 24 October 2015, Boenisch scored his first Bayer Leverkusen goal in two years, in a 4–3 win over Stuttgart. In a match against Hertha BSC on 5 December 2015, Boenisch received a straight red card, just 18 minutes to the start of the game for a professional foul committed. Shortly after, Boenisch was suspended for two matches and fined as a result. After suffering an injury on his muscle, Boenisch made his return to the first team in a 3–3 draw against Augsburg on 5 March 2016. His return was short-lived when he suffered a thigh injury that ruled him out of the season. Although he returned to the first team as an unused substitute in the last game of the season against Ingolstadt 04, Boenisch finished the season with eight appearances and at the end of the 2015–16 season, he was released by the club when his contract expired.

=== 1860 Munich ===
On 6 October 2016, Boenisch agreed to a two-year deal with the Bavarian club.

=== Floridsdorfer AC ===
On 27 August 2019, after being without a club for two years, Boenisch signed for Austrian second tier club Floridsdorfer AC signing a contract until the end of the 2019–20 season.

His contract was terminated at his request in late January 2020. He made eight league appearances for the club.

=== Wiener Neustadt ===
On 7 February 2020, Boenisch joined SC Wiener Neustadt. He left again at the end of the season.

== International career ==
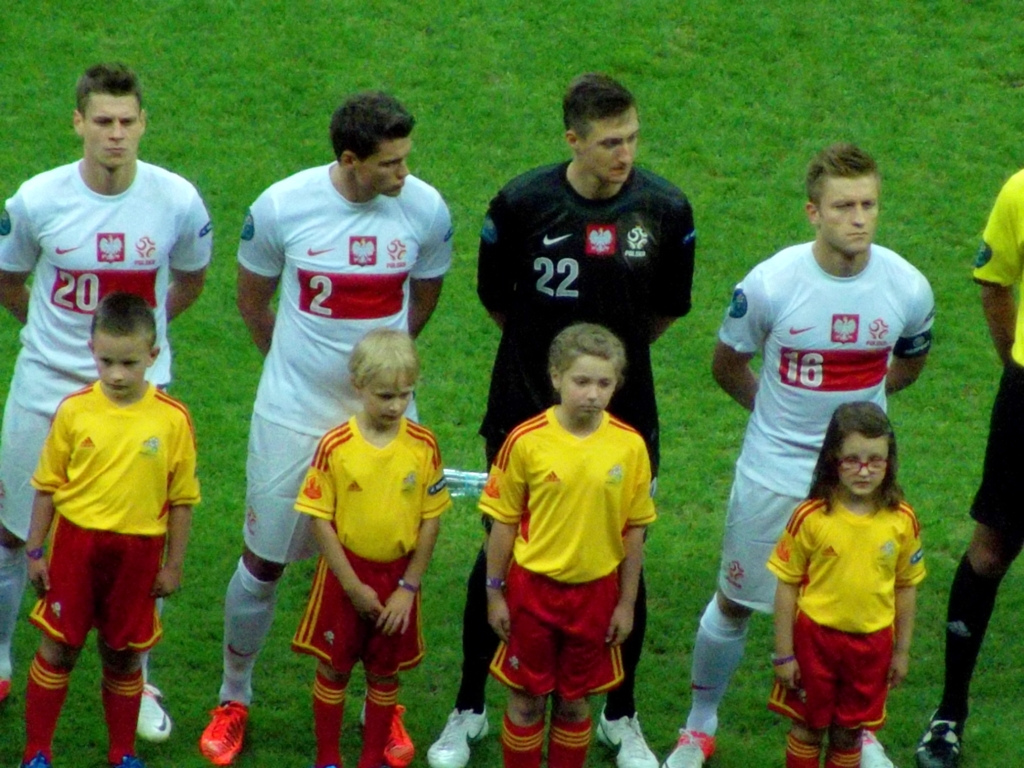
Boenisch no.2 (second left) lining up ahead of a match in UEFA Euro 2012 between Russia and Poland.

On 14 November 2006, Boenisch was called up by German under-20 team for the first time and earned his first cap for the side in a 4–1 victory against Austria.

Around the same time being on the under-20 duty, Boenisch was called up by German under-21 team in November 2006 and made his under-21 team debut, in a 2–0 win over Scotland U21. The Polish-born player hesitated whether to play for Poland or Germany. Later, there were rumors that Boenisch would receive a call up from Leo Beenhakker for the match against Greece but he was not listed in the official call ups. Boenisch said that he was not interested in playing for Poland anymore, and was concentrating on playing for the German U-21 team. He won the 2009 European Under-21 Championship with Germany.

In November 2009, there were rumors that Poland's new national football team coach Franciszek Smuda was interested in the player but Boenisch said that he had made no decision. Due to lack chances for a future call up to the German senior squad, on 20 August 2010 Boenisch finally decided to play for Poland and received his first call up for matches against Ukraine and Australia He made his debut for Poland against Ukraine on 4 September 2010.

In May 2012, Boenisch was called up by Poland national team for the UEFA Euro 2012 squad. He played his first competitive match for Poland in the opening game of the tournament against Greece on 8 June 2012 and went on to play all three matches, as they were eliminated from the group stage.

== Personal life ==
After previously dating Natalia, Boenisch was engaged to Tatjana Batinić, the 2006 Miss Austria. The two first met in late-2009 and began dating. The couple was married in the summer of 2013. In 2015, Boenisch became a father when his wife gave birth to a son.

In April 2013, the couple's Mercedes M-Class was set on fire, along with three other cars.

== Career statistics ==
=== Club ===
Appearances and goals by club, season and competition
Club	Season	League			National cup (Note: Includes DFB-Pokal, Austrian Cup)		League cup (Note: Includes DFL-Ligapokal)		Continental		Total	
Club	Season	Division	Apps	Goals	Apps	Goals	Apps	Goals	Apps	Goals	Apps	Goals
Schalke 04	2005–06	Bundesliga	1	0	0	0	0	0	1 (Note: Appearance(s) in UEFA Cup)	0	2	0
Schalke 04	2006–07	Bundesliga	8	0	0	0	2	0	0	0	10	0
Schalke 04	Total		9	0	0	0	2	0	1	0	12	0
Werder Bremen	2007–08	Bundesliga	9	1	0	0	2	0	3	0	14	1
Werder Bremen	2008–09	Bundesliga	24	0	5	0	—		13 (Note: Four appearances in UEFA Champions League, nine appearances in UEFA Cup)	0	42	0
Werder Bremen	2009–10	Bundesliga	17	0	2	0	—		3 (Note: Appearances in UEFA Europa League)	1	22	1
Werder Bremen	2010–11	Bundesliga	1	0	1	0	—		2 (Note: Appearances in UEFA Champions League)	0	4	0
Werder Bremen	2011–12	Bundesliga	4	0	0	0	—		0	0	4	0
Werder Bremen	Total		55	1	8	0	2	0	18	1	83	2
Bayer Leverkusen	2012–13	Bundesliga	15	1	1	0	—		2	0	18	1
Bayer Leverkusen	2013–14	Bundesliga	25	1	2	0	—		4	0	31	1
Bayer Leverkusen	2014–15	Bundesliga	12	0	2	0	—		5	0	19	0
Bayer Leverkusen	2015–16	Bundesliga	8	1	0	0	—		0	0	8	1
Bayer Leverkusen	Total		59	3	5	0	0	0	11	0	75	3
1860 Munich	2016–17	2. Bundesliga	14	0	1	0	—		—		15	0
Floridsdorfer AC	2019–20	Austrian Second League	8	1	1	0	—		—		9	1
Wiener Neustadt	2019–20	Austrian Regionalliga East	2	0	—		—		—		2	0
Career total			143	5	15	0	4	0	30	1	195	6

=== International ===
Appearances and goals by national team and year
National team	Year	Apps	Goals
Poland	2010	2	0
Poland	2012	7	0
Poland	2013	5	0
Total		14	0

== Honours ==
Werder Bremen

- DFB-Pokal: 2008–09
- UEFA Cup runners-up: 2008–09

Germany U21

- UEFA European Under-21 Football Championship: 2009
