= Christian Vander =

Christian Vander may refer to:

- Christian Vander (musician) (born 1948), French drummer and founder of the band Magma
- Christian Vander (footballer) (born 1980), German football player
