= Peter Niemeyer =

German footballer (born 1983)

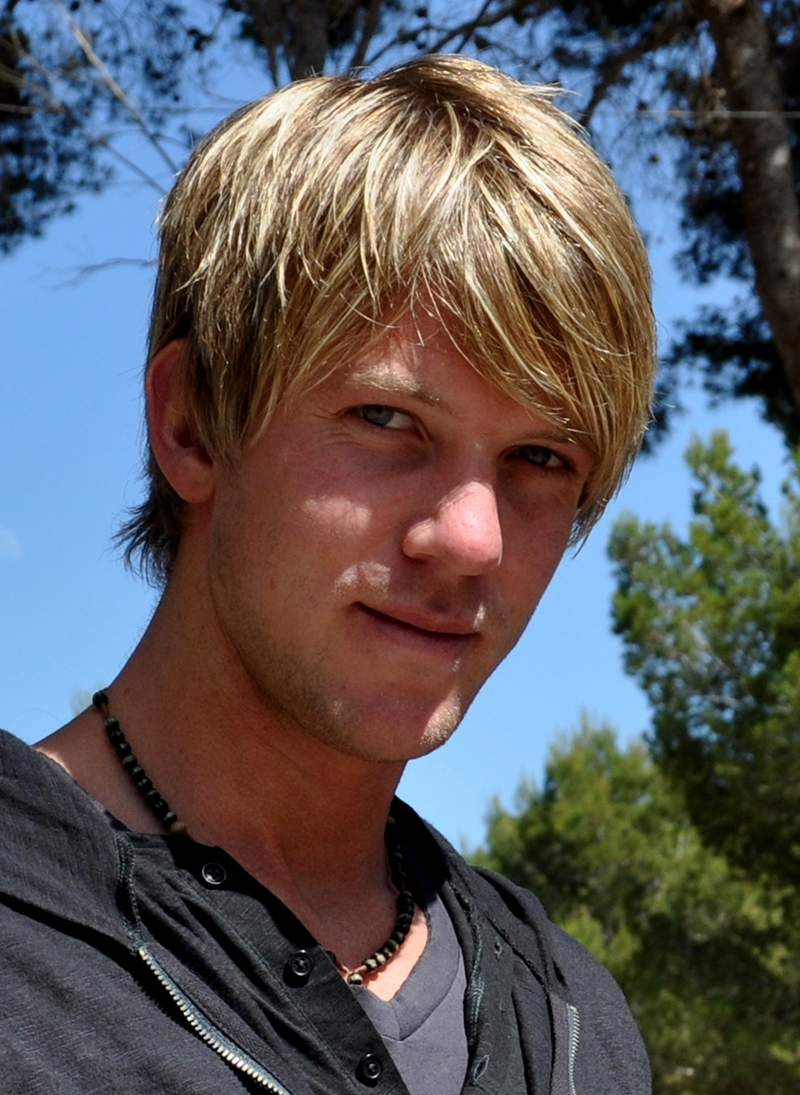
- Niemeyer in 2010

Personal information
- Full name: Peter Michael Josef Niemeyer
- Date of birth: 22 November 1983 (age 42)
- Place of birth: Hörstel, West Germany
- Height: 1.88 m (6 ft 2 in)
- Positions: Defensive midfielder; centre back

Youth career
- –1996: Teuto Riesenbeck
- 1996–1999: Borussia Emsdetten
- 1999–2002: Twente

Senior career*
Years	Team	Apps	(Gls)
2002–2007	Twente	106	(4)
2007–2011	Werder Bremen	32	(2)
2007–2010	Werder Bremen II	12	(1)
2010–2011	→ Hertha BSC (loan)	28	(3)
2011–2015	Hertha BSC	93	(6)
2015–2018	Darmstadt 98	50	(2)
Total		321	(18)

International career
2005–2006	Germany U21	6	(0)
- * Club domestic league appearances and goals

Peter Michael Josef Niemeyer (born 22 November 1983) is a German football manager, executive, and former player. He serves as the sporting director of Preußen Münster. During his playing career, he mainly featured as a defensive midfielder, he also operated as a central defender.

== Club career ==
Although born in Germany, Niemeyer spent the first years of his professional career in the Netherlands, playing for FC Twente in the Eredivisie. In January 2007, he joined Bundesliga side Werder Bremen, appearing in three league games for the main squad in the 2006–07 season.

On 29 September 2007, Niemeyer participated in the 8–1 home crushing of Arminia Bielefeld, scoring the game opener and his first Bundesliga goal. Incidentally, he fell out with an injury in the match after just 33 minutes.

In the 2008–09 season, Niemeyer appeared in a career-best 25 official games, including five in the UEFA Cup, as Werder reached the final against Shakhtar Donetsk, where he started in a 2–1 overtime loss.

On 9 August 2010, Niemeyer moved on loan to Hertha BSC, who were relegated to the second division the season before.

On 3 August 2015, Niemeyer signed for recently promoted Darmstadt 98 in the Bundesliga on a three-year deal. On 1 September 2018, after the closing of the 2018 summer transfer window, he announced he had not received an offer to renew his contract and would leave the club. He retired from football shortly afterwards.

== International career ==
Niemeyer played six games for the Germany under-21 team under manager Dieter Eilts. In the summer of 2006, he took part in the 2006 UEFA European Under-21 Championship in Portugal.

== Coaching and executive career ==
Between 2019 and 2020, Niemeyer was the coach of the FC Twente U21 team. At the same time he worked as the assistant coach of the first team under manager Gonzalo García and functioned as head of the youth department.

In July 2020, Niemeyer signed a contract until 2023 as sports director of Preußen Münster in Regionalliga West.

== Career statistics ==
Appearances and goals by club, season and competition
Club	Season	League			Cup		Continental (Note: Appearances in UEFA Champions League and UEFA Cup)		Other (Note: Appearances in Eredivisie playoffs, German League Cup, and German relegation playoff)		Total		Ref.
Club	Season	Division	Apps	Goals	Apps	Goals	Apps	Goals	Apps	Goals	Apps	Goals	Ref.
Twente	2002–03	Eredivisie	3	0			—		—		3	0	
Twente	2003–04	Eredivisie	31	1			—		—		31	1	
Twente	2004–05	Eredivisie	27	1			—		—		27	1	
Twente	2005–06	Eredivisie	30	2			—		5	0	35	2	
Twente	2006–07	Eredivisie	15	0			4	0	—		19	0	
Twente	Total		106	4			4	0	5	0	115	4	—
Werder Bremen	2006–07	Bundesliga	3	0	0	0	0	0	—		3	0	
Werder Bremen	2007–08	Bundesliga	3	1	1	0	0	0	1	0	5	1	
Werder Bremen	2008–09	Bundesliga	15	0	4	0	6	0	—		25	0	
Werder Bremen	2009–10	Bundesliga	11	1	3	0	7	0	—		21	1	
Werder Bremen	Total		32	2	8	0	13	0	1	0	54	2	—
Werder Bremen II	2006–07	Regionalliga Nord	3	0	—		—		—		3	0	
Werder Bremen II	2007–08	Regionalliga Nord	6	0	—		—		—		6	0	
Werder Bremen II	2008–09	3. Liga	3	1	—		—		—		3	1	
Werder Bremen II	Total		12	1	0	0	0	0	0	0	12	1	—
Hertha BSC	2010–11	Bundesliga	28	3	2	0	—		—		30	3	
Hertha BSC	2011–12	Bundesliga	31	3	4	0	—		2	0	37	3	
Hertha BSC	2012–13	2. Bundesliga	25	2	1	0	—		—		26	2	
Hertha BSC	2013–14	Bundesliga	20	0	1	1	—		—		21	1	
Hertha BSC	2014–15	Bundesliga	17	1	1	0	—		—		18	1	
Hertha BSC	Total		121	9	9	1	0	0	2	0	132	10	—
Darmstadt 98	2015–16	Bundesliga	31	2	3	0	—		—		34	2	
Darmstadt 98	2016–17	Bundesliga	15	0	2	0	—		—		17	0	
Darmstadt 98	2017–18	2. Bundesliga	4	0	0	0	—		—		4	0	
Darmstadt 98	Total		50	2	5	0	0	0	0	0	55	2	—
Career total			321	18	22	1	17	0	8	0	368	19	—

== Honours ==
Werder Bremen

- DFB-Pokal: 2008–09
- UEFA Cup runner-up: 2008–09

Hertha BSC

- 2. Bundesliga: 2011–12, 2012–13
