= Duško Tošić =

Serbian footballer (born 1985)

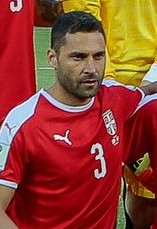
- Tošić with Serbia at the 2018 FIFA World Cup

Personal information
- Full name: Duško Tošić
- Date of birth: 19 January 1985 (age 41)
- Place of birth: Zrenjanin, SR Serbia, SFR Yugoslavia
- Height: 1.84 m (6 ft 0 in)
- Positions: Left-back; centre-back

Youth career
- 1997–2002: Proleter Zrenjanin

Senior career*
Years	Team	Apps	(Gls)
2003–2006	OFK Beograd	80	(6)
2006–2007	Sochaux	40	(1)
2007–2010	Werder Bremen	22	(0)
2010	Portsmouth	0	(0)
2010	→ Queens Park Rangers (loan)	5	(0)
2010–2012	Red Star Belgrade	41	(2)
2011	→ Betis (loan)	1	(0)
2012–2015	Gençlerbirliği	89	(2)
2015–2018	Beşiktaş	66	(7)
2018–2020	Guangzhou R&F	37	(6)
2021	Kasımpaşa	10	(0)
Total		391	(24)

International career
2006–2018	Serbia	26	(1)
Medal record
Silver medal – second place	UEFA Under-21 Championship	2007
- * Club domestic league appearances and goals

Duško Tošić (Serbian Cyrillic: Душко Тошић, pronounced [dǔʃko tǒʃitɕ, - tôː-]; born 19 January 1985) is a Serbian former professional footballer who played as a defender. He represented Serbia at the 2008 Summer Olympics and 2018 FIFA World Cup.

== Club career ==
=== Early career ===
Born in Zrenjanin, Tošić began his career in his native Serbia playing for OFK Beograd before moving to French club Sochaux in the winter of 2006 but only spent one and a half seasons with the club as other European clubs from Italy, Germany and Spain were expressing an interest. During his time at Sochaux, they won the 2006–07 Coupe de France.

=== Werder Bremen ===
He transferred to Werder Bremen for the 2007–08 season, where he signed a contract until 2011. On 1 February 2010, his contract with Bremen was dissolved.

=== Portsmouth ===
Tošić signed for Portsmouth on 12 February 2010, but as a result of Portsmouth's financial situation Tošić's registration with the Premier League was withheld and he was forced to leave the club within a month of signing for them. Tošić was an unused substitute in Portsmouth's 4–1 FA Cup fifth-round win at Southampton in February, and failed to get on the pitch that season. He signed a loan deal to play for QPR until the end of the season on 25 March 2010.

=== Red Star Belgrade ===
On 7 July 2010, he joined Red Star Belgrade, signing a three-year contract, rejecting the interest of some English clubs. On 31 August 2011, it was announced he would join Real Betis on a two-year loan with an option of Betis buying the player afterwards. He returned to Red Star in January 2012.

=== Gençlerbirliği ===
On 21 June 2012, it was announced that Tošić will leave Red Star Belgrade and join Turkish Süper Lig side Gençlerbirliği. He played for three seasons there and was one of the best players in the team.

=== Beşiktaş ===
On 2 June 2015, Tošić signed a three-year contract for Beşiktaş. Beşiktaş won the title in the Süper Lig in 2015–16, as well as in 2016–17, with Tošić mainly occupying the left central defender position.

=== Guangzhou R&F ===
On 18 May 2018, Beşiktaş have announced that Tošić is set to sign for Guangzhou R&F, with a €5 million fee mooted. He signed two and a half year long contract worth €5.8 million per season.

== International career ==
Tošić made his national debut against Norway on 15 November 2006, a friendly which ended in a 1–1 draw. He earned a total of 26 caps, scoring 1 goal and in June 2018, Mladen Krstajić included Tošić in Serbia's final 23-man squad for the 2018 FIFA World Cup, where he appeared in two matches against Costa Rica and Switzerland. That latter game proved to be his final international match.

== Personal life ==
Born in Zrenjanin, Tošić grew up in the nearby Orlovat village. He married Serbian pop singer Jelena Karleuša in June 2008. The couple has two daughters, Atina and Nika. In September 2024, both Karleuša and Tošić confirmed in separate statements that they were filing for a divorce after years of separation.

Prior to the 2023 Serbian parliamentary election, Tošić pledged support to Aleksandar Vučić and his campaign.

== Career statistics ==
=== Club ===
As of 18 April 2021

Appearances and goals by club, season and competition
Club	Season	League			National Cup		Continental		Other		Total	
Club	Season	Division	Apps	Goals	Apps	Goals	Apps	Goals	Apps	Goals	Apps	Goals
OFK Beograd	2002–03	First League	14	0	0	0	—		—		14	0
OFK Beograd	2003–04	First League	25	2	3	0	2	1	—		30	3
OFK Beograd	2004–05	First League	24	2	1	0	6	1	—		31	3
OFK Beograd	2005–06	First League	17	2	3	2	2	0	—		22	4
OFK Beograd	Total		80	6	7	2	10	2	—		97	10
Sochaux	2005–06	Ligue 1	14	0	1	0	—		—		15	0
Sochaux	2006–07	Ligue 1	26	1	9	0	—		—		35	1
Sochaux	Total		40	1	10	0	—		—		50	1
Werder Bremen	2007–08	Bundesliga	12	0	2	0	6	0	—		20	0
Werder Bremen	2008–09	Bundesliga	9	0	1	0	1	0	—		11	0
Werder Bremen	2009–10	Bundesliga	1	0	0	0	0	0	—		1	0
Werder Bremen	Total		22	0	3	0	7	0	—		32	0
Queens Park Rangers (loan)	2009–10	EFL Championship	5	0	0	0	—		—		5	0
Red Star	2010–11	Serbian SuperLiga	25	1	3	0	2	0	—		30	1
Red Star	2011–12	Serbian SuperLiga	16	1	3	0	4	0	—		23	1
Red Star	Total		41	2	6	0	6	0	—		53	2
Betis (loan)	2011–12	La Liga	1	0	1	0	—		—		2	0
Gençlerbirliği	2012–13	Süper Lig	33	1	2	0	—		—		35	1
Gençlerbirliği	2013–14	Süper Lig	28	0	0	0	—		—		28	0
Gençlerbirliği	2014–15	Süper Lig	28	1	3	0	—		—		31	1
Gençlerbirliği	Total		89	2	5	0	—		—		94	2
Beşiktaş	2015–16	Süper Lig	15	0	7	0	2	0	—		24	0
Beşiktaş	2016–17	Süper Lig	26	2	1	0	12	0	1 (Note: Appearances in Turkish Super Cup)	0	40	2
Beşiktaş	2017–18	Süper Lig	25	5	3	0	7	0	1	0	36	5
Beşiktaş	Total		66	7	11	0	21	0	2	0	100	7
Guangzhou R&F	2018	Chinese Super League	13	1	4	0	—		—		17	1
Guangzhou R&F	2019	Chinese Super League	12	3	0	0	—		—		12	3
Guangzhou R&F	2020	Chinese Super League	12	2	0	0	—		—		12	2
Guangzhou R&F	Total		37	6	4	0	0	0	0	0	41	6
Kasımpaşa	2020–21	Süper Lig	10	0	0	0	—		—		10	0
Career total			391	24	47	2	44	2	2	0	484	28

=== International ===
As of 22 June 2018

Appearances and goals by national team and year
National team	Year	Apps	Goals
Serbia	2006	1	0
Serbia	2007	6	1
Serbia	2008	2	0
Serbia	2009	0	0
Serbia	2010	0	0
Serbia	2011	0	0
Serbia	2012	2	0
Serbia	2013	0	0
Serbia	2014	3	0
Serbia	2015	3	0
Serbia	2016	2	0
Serbia	2017	2	0
Serbia	2018	5	0
Total		26	1

Scores and results list Serbia's goal tally first, score column indicates score after each Tošić goal.

List of international goals scored by Duško Tošić
No.	Date	Venue	Opponent	Score	Result	Competition
1	17 October 2007	Tofiq Bahramov Republican Stadium, Baku, Azerbaijan	Azerbaijan	1–0	6–1	UEFA Euro 2008 qualification

== Honours ==
Sochaux

- Coupe de France: 2006–07

Werder Bremen

- DFB-Pokal: 2008–09
- UEFA Cup Runner-up: 2008–09

Red Star Belgrade

- Serbian Cup: 2011–12

Beşiktaş

- Süper Lig: 2015–16, 2016–17

Serbia

- UEFA Under-21 Championship: runner-up 2007

Individual

- UEFA European Under-21 Championship Team of the Tournament: 2007
- Serbian SuperLiga Team of the Season: 2010–11, 2011–12
