= Christian Vander (footballer) =

German footballer

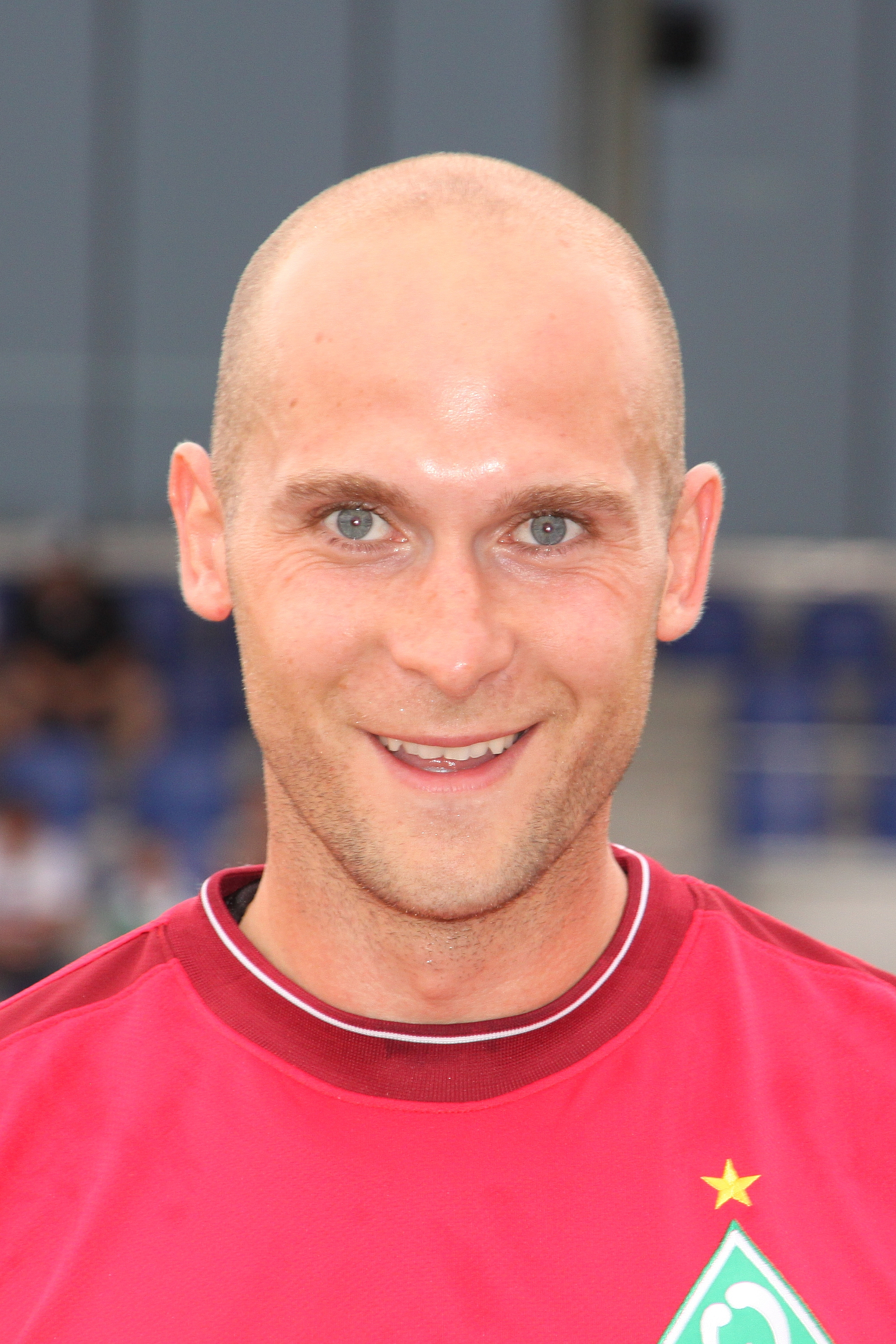
- Vander in 2009

Personal information
- Date of birth: 24 October 1980 (age 46)
- Place of birth: Willich, West Germany
- Height: 1.95 m (6 ft 5 in)
- Position: Goalkeeper

Team information
- Current team: Werder Bremen (Goalkeeping coach)

Youth career
- –1997: Borussia Mönchengladbach
- 1997–1999: KFC Uerdingen 05

Senior career*
Years	Team	Apps	(Gls)
1999–2000	KFC Uerdingen 05	34	(0)
2000–2006	VfL Bochum	24	(0)
2001–2004	→ VfL Bochum II	10	(0)
2005–2006	→ Werder Bremen (loan)	1	(0)
2005–2006	→ Werder Bremen II (loan)	5	(0)
2006–2013	Werder Bremen	10	(0)
2006–2013	Werder Bremen II	46	(0)
Total		130	(0)

International career
	Germany U18	1	(0)

Managerial career
- 2013–2014: Werder Bremen II (goalkeeping coach)
- 2013–2014: Germany U16 (goalkeeping coach)
- 2014–2015: Germany U20 (goalkeeping coach)
- 2014–: Werder Bremen (goalkeeping coach)
- * Club domestic league appearances and goals

Christian Vander (born 24 October 1980) is a German former professional footballer who played as a goalkeeper. He was the second-choice goalkeeper at SV Werder Bremen behind Tim Wiese after the departure of veteran Andreas Reinke. Before joining Bremen in August 2005, he played for VfL Bochum and KFC Uerdingen 05. He made his league debut for Uerdingen at the age of 19, playing 90 minutes in a 2. Bundesliga match against SpVgg Unterhaching on 9 May 1999.

In 2014, Vander became goalkeeping coach at Werder Bremen.

== Honours ==
Werder Bremen

- DFL-Ligapokal: 2006
- DFB-Pokal: 2008–09
