= 2006–07 SV Werder Bremen season =

SV Werder Bremen
2006–07 season
- Manager: Thomas Schaaf
- Stadium: Weser-Stadion
- Bundesliga: 3rd
- DFB-Pokal: First round
- DFL-Ligapokal: Winners
- Champions League: Group stage
- UEFA Cup: Semi-finals
- Top goalscorer: League: Diego/Miroslav Klose (13); All: Miroslav Klose (17)
Home colours	Away colours	Third colours

During the 2006–07 German football season, Werder Bremen competed in the Bundesliga.

== Season summary ==
Bremen finished in third this season, achieving Champions League qualification. The club reached the UEFA Cup semi-final before being eliminated in a 5-1 aggregate defeat to eventual runners-up Espanyol. The club also won its first and only Ligapokal title.

== Players ==
=== First-team squad ===
Squad at end of season

Note: Flags indicate national team as defined under FIFA eligibility rules; some limited exceptions apply. Players may hold more than one non-FIFA nationality.

No.	Pos.	Nation	Player
1	GK	GER	Andreas Reinke
3	DF	FIN	Petri Pasanen
4	DF	BRA	Naldo
5	DF	CMR	Pierre Womé
6	MF	GER	Frank Baumann
7	MF	CRO	Jurica Vranješ
8	MF	GER	Clemens Fritz
9	FW	SWE	Markus Rosenberg
10	MF	BRA	Diego
11	FW	GER	Miroslav Klose (Note: Klose was born in Opole, Poland, but was raised in Germany from the age of 8 and made his international debut for Germany in March 2001.)
14	MF	GER	Aaron Hunt
15	DF	GER	Patrick Owomoyela
17	FW	CRO	Ivan Klasnić (Note: Klasnić was born in Hamburg, West Germany (now Germany), but also qualified to represent Croatia internationally and represented Croatia at U-19 and U-21 level before making his international debut for Croatia in February 2004.)
18	GK	GER	Tim Wiese
19	DF	GER	Jérome Polenz
20	MF	DEN	Daniel Jensen

No.	Pos.	Nation	Player
22	MF	GER	Torsten Frings
23	FW	POR	Hugo Almeida (on loan from Porto)
24	MF	GER	Tim Borowski
25	MF	GER	Peter Niemeyer
26	DF	GER	Florian Mohr
27	DF	GER	Christian Schulz
28	FW	GER	Kevin Schindler
29	DF	GER	Per Mertesacker
30	GK	DEN	Kasper Jensen
31	MF	GER	Kevin Artmann
32	DF	GER	Sebastian Schachten
33	GK	GER	Christian Vander
34	FW	AUT	Martin Harnik (Note: Harnik was born in Hamburg, West Germany (now Germany), but also qualified to represent Austria internationally through his father and represented Austria at U-19, U-20, and U-21 level before making his international debut for Austria in August 2007.)
37	MF	BRA	Thiago Rockenbach
38	MF	POR	Amaury Bischoff (Note: Bischoff was born in Colmar, France, and represented France at U-18 level, but also qualified to represent Portugal internationally through his mother, switched his international allegiance to Portugal in May 2007, and represented Portugal at U-21 level.)

=== Left club during season ===
Note: Flags indicate national team as defined under FIFA eligibility rules; some limited exceptions apply. Players may hold more than one non-FIFA nationality.

No. / Pos. / Nation / Player; 9 / FW / EGY / Mohamed Zidan (to Mainz)	No. / Pos. / Nation / Player; 16 / DF / DEN / Leon Andreasen (on loan to Mainz)

== Transfers ==
=== In ===
- Diego - FC Porto, May, €6,000,000
- Markus Rosenberg - Ajax, January 26
- Hugo Almeida - Porto, season-long loan
- Peter Niemeyer - FC Twente, January
- Christian Vander - VfL Bochum

=== Out ===
- Mohamed Zidan - Mainz, 17 January, €2,800,000
- Leon Andreasen - Mainz, January, season-long loan

== Results ==
=== UEFA Champions League ===
==== Group stage ====
Pos	Team	Pld	W	D	L	GF	GA	GD	Pts	Qualification	CHE	BAR	BRM	LSO
1	(England) Chelsea	6	4	1	1	10	4	+6	13	Advance to knockout stage	—	1–0	2–0	2–0
2	(Spain) Barcelona	6	3	2	1	12	4	+8	11	Advance to knockout stage	2–2	—	2–0	5–0
3	(Germany) Werder Bremen	6	3	1	2	7	5	+2	10	Transfer to UEFA Cup	1–0	1–1	—	2–0
4	(Bulgaria) Levski Sofia	6	0	0	6	1	17	−16	0		1–3	0–2	0–3	—

Source: RSSSF

12 September 2006	Chelsea (England)	2–0	(Germany) Werder Bremen	Stamford Bridge, London
20:45	Essien 24'; Ballack 68' (pen.)	Report MatchCentre		Attendance: 32,135; Referee: Kyros Vassaras (Greece)

27 September 2006	Werder Bremen (Germany)	1–1	(Spain) Barcelona	Weserstadion, Bremen
20:45	Puyol 56' (o.g.)	Report MatchCentre	Messi 89'	Attendance: 41,256; Referee: Roberto Rosetti (Italy)

18 October 2006	Werder Bremen (Germany)	2–0	(Bulgaria) Levski Sofia	Weserstadion, Bremen
20:45	Naldo 45+1'; Diego 73'	Report MatchCentre		Attendance: 41,000; Referee: Paul Allaerts (Belgium)

31 October 2006	Levski Sofia (Bulgaria)	0–3	(Germany) Werder Bremen	Vasil Levski National Stadium, Sofia
20:45		Report MatchCentre	Mikhailov 33' (o.g.); Baumann 35'; Frings 37'	Attendance: 40,000; Referee: Matteo Trefoloni (Italy)

22 November 2006	Werder Bremen (Germany)	1–0	(England) Chelsea	Weserstadion, Bremen
20:45	Mertesacker 27'	Report MatchCentre		Attendance: 40,000; Referee: Ľuboš Micheľ (Slovakia)

5 December 2006	Barcelona (Spain)	2–0	(Germany) Werder Bremen	Camp Nou, Barcelona
20:45	Ronaldinho 13'; Guðjohnsen 18'	Report MatchCentre		Attendance: 95,500; Referee: Massimo Busacca (Switzerland)

=== UEFA Cup ===
==== Round of 32 ====
14 February 2007	Werder Bremen (Germany)	3–0	(Netherlands) Ajax	Weserstadion, Bremen
20:30	Mertesacker 48'; Naldo 54'; Frings 71'	Report		Referee: Lucílio Batista (Portugal)

22 February 2007	Ajax (Netherlands)	3–1 (3–4 agg.)	(Germany) Werder Bremen	Amsterdam Arena, Amsterdam
21:00	Leonardo 4'; Huntelaar 60'; Babel 74'	Report	Almeida 14'	Referee: Howard Webb (England)

==== Round of 16 ====
8 March 2007	Celta Vigo (Spain)	0–1	(Germany) Werder Bremen	Balaídos, Vigo
20:45		Report	Almeida 84'	Attendance: 9,236; Referee: Robert Małek (Poland)

14 March 2007	Werder Bremen (Germany)	2–0 (3–0 agg.)	(Spain) Celta Vigo	Weserstadion, Bremen
20:45	Almeida 48'; Fritz 61'	Report		Attendance: 35,278; Referee: Stefano Farina (Italy)

==== Quarter-final ====
5 April 2007	AZ (Netherlands)	0–0	(Germany) Werder Bremen	DSB Stadion, Alkmaar
20:45		Report		Referee: Olegário Benquerença (Portugal)

12 April 2007	Werder Bremen (Germany)	4–1 (4–1 agg.)	(Netherlands) AZ	Weserstadion, Bremen
20:45	Borowski 16'; Klose 36', 62'; Diego 82'	Report	Dembélé 32'	Referee: Mike Riley (England)

==== Semi-final ====
26 April 2007	Espanyol (Spain)	3–0	(Germany) Werder Bremen	Estadi Olímpic Lluís Companys, Barcelona
20:45	Moisés 21'; Pandiani 50'; Coro 88'	Report		Referee: Tom Henning Øvrebø (Norway)

3 May 2007	Werder Bremen (Germany)	1–2 (1–5 agg.)	(Spain) Espanyol	Weserstadion, Bremen
20:45	Almeida 4'	Report	Coro 50'; Lacruz 61'	Referee: Bertrand Layec (France)
