= 2009 German Supercup =

2009 Volkswagen SuperCup
Deutscher Supercup
- Event: German Supercup
VfL Wolfsburg	Werder Bremen
1	2
- Date: 20 July 2009
- Venue: Volkswagen Arena, Wolfsburg
- Referee: Günter Perl (Pullach)
- Attendance: 18,000

The 2009 German Supercup, known as the Volkswagen SuperCup for sponsorship reasons, was an unofficial edition of the German Supercup, a football match contested by the winners of the previous season's Bundesliga and DFB-Pokal competitions.

The match was played at the Volkswagen Arena in Wolfsburg, and was contested by 2008–09 Bundesliga winners VfL Wolfsburg, and 2008–09 DFB-Pokal winners Werder Bremen. Bremen won the match 2–1 to claim the unofficial title.

== Teams ==
Team	Qualification
VfL Wolfsburg	2008–09 Bundesliga champions
Werder Bremen	2008–09 DFB-Pokal winners

== Match ==
=== Details ===
20 July 2009
20:20 CEST

VfL Wolfsburg	1–2	Werder Bremen
Grafite 67'	Report	Mertesacker 20'; Fritz 81'

Volkswagen Arena, Wolfsburg
Attendance: 18,000
Referee: Günter Perl (Pullach)

VfL Wolfsburg	Werder Bremen

GK	35	(Switzerland) Marwin Hitz
RB	20	(Germany) Sascha Riether		(substituted off) 63'
CB	17	(Germany) Alexander Madlung		(substituted off) 46'
CB	43	(Italy) Andrea Barzagli		(substituted off) 84'
LB	4	(Germany) Marcel Schäfer
DM	2	(Italy) Cristian Zaccardo		(substituted off) 46'
CM	8	(Denmark) Thomas Kahlenberg		(substituted off) 63'
CM	25	(Germany) Christian Gentner
AM	10	(Bosnia and Herzegovina) Zvjezdan Misimović (c)
CF	23	(Brazil) Grafite
CF	27	(Germany) Alexander Esswein		(substituted off) 79'
Substitutes:
DF	5	(Portugal) Ricardo Costa	(yellow card) 84'	(substituted on) 46'
DF	6	(Czech Republic) Jan Šimůnek		(substituted on) 84'
DF	19	(Slovakia) Peter Pekarík		(substituted on) 63'
MF	15	(Algeria) Karim Ziani		(substituted on) 46'
MF	28	(Germany) Daniel Baier	(red card) 90'	(substituted on) 63'
FW	11	(Brazil) Caiuby		(substituted on) 79'
Manager:
(Germany) Armin Veh

GK	1	(Germany) Tim Wiese
RB	8	(Germany) Clemens Fritz
CB	29	(Germany) Per Mertesacker
CB	4	(Brazil) Naldo	(substituted off) 88'
LB	5	(Serbia) Duško Tošić	(substituted off) 73'
RM	44	(Germany) Philipp Bargfrede	(substituted off) 73'
CM	22	(Germany) Torsten Frings (c)
CM	25	(Germany) Peter Niemeyer	(substituted off) 46'
LM	14	(Germany) Aaron Hunt	(substituted off) 73'
CF	18	(Ivory Coast) Boubacar Sanogo
CF	39	(Bolivia) Marcelo Moreno	(substituted off) 60'
Substitutes:
DF	2	(Germany) Sebastian Boenisch	(substituted on) 73'
DF	3	(Finland) Petri Pasanen	(substituted on) 88'
MF	7	(Croatia) Jurica Vranješ	(substituted on) 73'
MF	11	(Germany) Mesut Özil	(substituted on) 73'
MF	34	(Austria) Martin Harnik	(substituted on) 46'
FW	30	(Hungary) Márkó Futács	(substituted on) 60'
Manager:
(Germany) Thomas Schaaf

== See also ==
- 2009–10 Bundesliga
- 2009–10 DFB-Pokal
