= Naldo (footballer, born 1982) =

Brazilian footballer

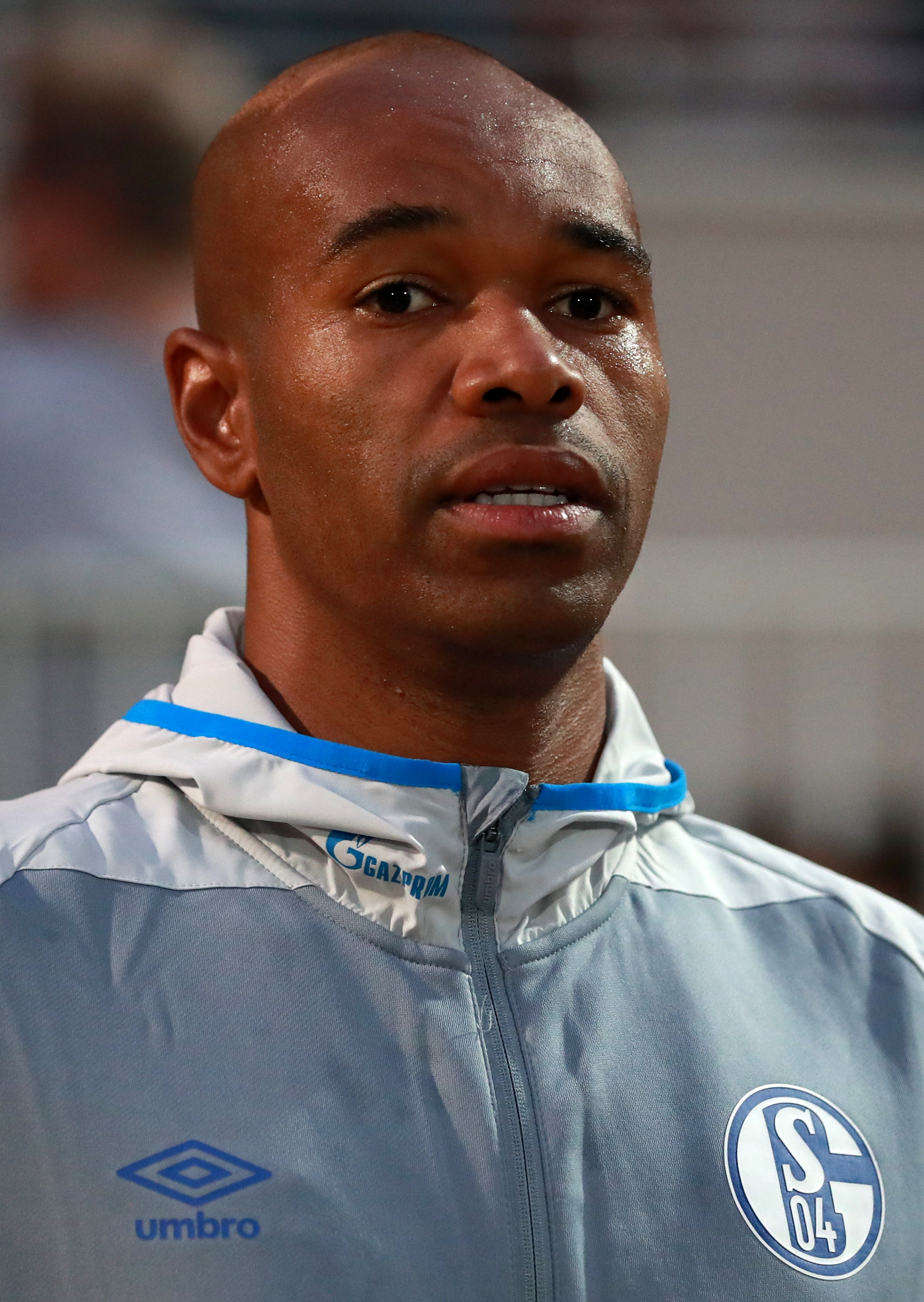
- Naldo with Schalke 04 in 2018

Personal information
- Full name: Ronaldo Aparecido Rodrigues
- Date of birth: 10 September 1982 (age 44)
- Place of birth: Londrina, Brazil
- Height: 1.98 m (6 ft 6 in)
- Position: Centre-back

Youth career
- RS Futebol

Senior career*
Years	Team	Apps	(Gls)
2002–2004	RS Futebol	47	(3)
2004–2005	Juventude	34	(8)
2005–2012	Werder Bremen	173	(22)
2012–2016	VfL Wolfsburg	125	(16)
2016–2019	Schalke 04	60	(8)
2019–2020	Monaco	7	(0)
Total		446	(57)

International career
2007–2009	Brazil	4	(0)
- * Club domestic league appearances and goals

Ronaldo Aparecido Rodrigues (born 10 September 1982), commonly known as Naldo, is a Brazilian former professional footballer who played as a centre-back. He spent most of his professional career in Germany, playing in the Bundesliga for Werder Bremen, VfL Wolfsburg and Schalke 04. From 2007 to 2009, he made four appearances for the Brazil national team.

After his playing career, he briefly held a coaching role at former club Schalke.

== Club career ==
=== Juventude ===
Born in Londrina, Brazil, Naldo began his football career playing for RS Futebol at the youth level before playing for them professionally. He spent two years at the club, making forty–seven appearances and scoring three times in all competitions.

At the start of the 2004 season, Naldo joined Juventude and made his debut on 2 May 2004, coming on as a substitute, in a 4–0 win against Paraná Clube. He then received his first start for the club, in a 1–0 win against Coritiba on 10 July 2004. Seven days later on 17 July 2004, Naldo scored his first goal for the club from a free kick, in a 1–0 win against Flamengo. Two weeks later on 1 August 2004, he scored his second goal for Juventude, in a 1–1 draw against Vasco da Gama. Naldo helped the club keep four consecutive clean sheets in the next four matches between 5 August 2004 and 14 August 2004. He scored his third goal of the season, once again from a free kick, in a 2–1 loss against Santos on 1 September 2004. After missing several matches due to injury, Naldo scored on his return to the starting line–up against Athletico Paranaense on 7 October 2004. At the end of the 2004 season, having played alongside Thiago Silva, he went on to make twenty–five appearances and scoring four times in all competitions.

At the start of the 2005 season, Naldo continued to remain in the first team for Juventude, playing in the centre–back position. He scored his first goal of the season to score an equaliser, as the club drew 2–2 against Corinthians on 24 May 2005. Naldo then scored three more goals, coming against Botafogo, Internacional and Flamengo. In the summer of 2005, he reported agreed a move to Bundesliga side Werder Bremen. By the time Naldo departed from the club, he went on to make thirty-six appearances and scored eight goals in all competitions.

=== Werder Bremen ===
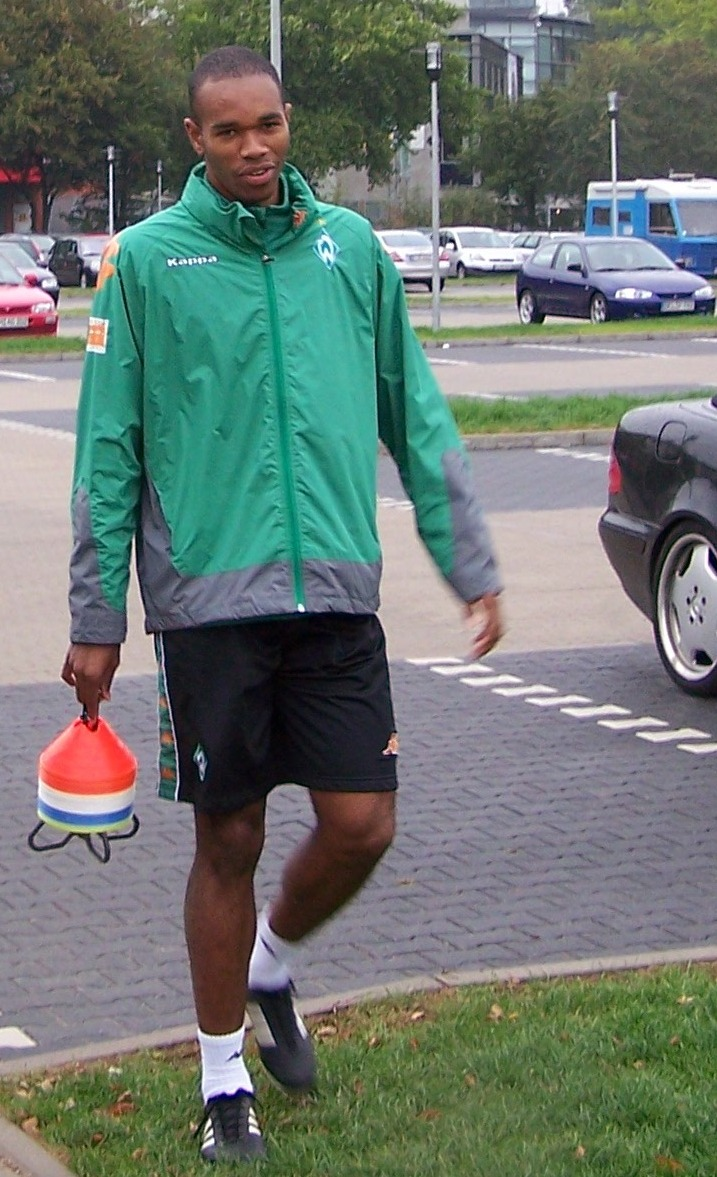
Naldo pictured during his time at Werder Bremen in the 2006–07 season.

His talent in Brazil led to Naldo signing with Werder Bremen in the summer of 2005, to replace Valérien Ismaël who left for Bayern Munich for €3 million. Upon joining the club, he was given the number four shirt.

Naldo made his Werder Bremen debut, starting the whole game, in a 5–2 win over Arminia Bielefeld in the opening game of the season. He played in both legs against Basel in the UEFA Champions League Qualifying Round, as the club advanced to the group stage following a 3–3 draw through away goal. Since joining Werder Bremen, Naldo quickly established himself in the starting eleven, playing in the centre–back position. His first goal for Werder Bremen came on 18 November 2005 against Wolfsburg, in a 6–1 win. However during a 2–1 loss against Schalke 04 on 26 November 2005, he suffered a shoulder injury that saw him miss one match. Naldo returned to the starting line–up against FC Köln on 11 December 2005 and scored his second goal of the season, a free kick from 30 meters out in a 4–1 win. Ten days later on 21 December 2005, he scored his third goal of the season, from a header in a 4–1 win against Hannover 96. Naldo then helped the club keep three consecutive clean sheets between 25 March 2006 and 8 April 2006, including a 3–0 win against Bayern Munich. Unfortunately, Werder Bremen ended up finishing second place behind Bayern Munich, but helped the club qualify for the UEFA Champions League next season. In his first season at Werder Bremen, he played in all but two of the club's Bundesliga games and in seven of their eight Champions League fixtures, along with two appearances in Champions League Qualifiers, making a total of forty–five appearances and scoring three times in all competitions.

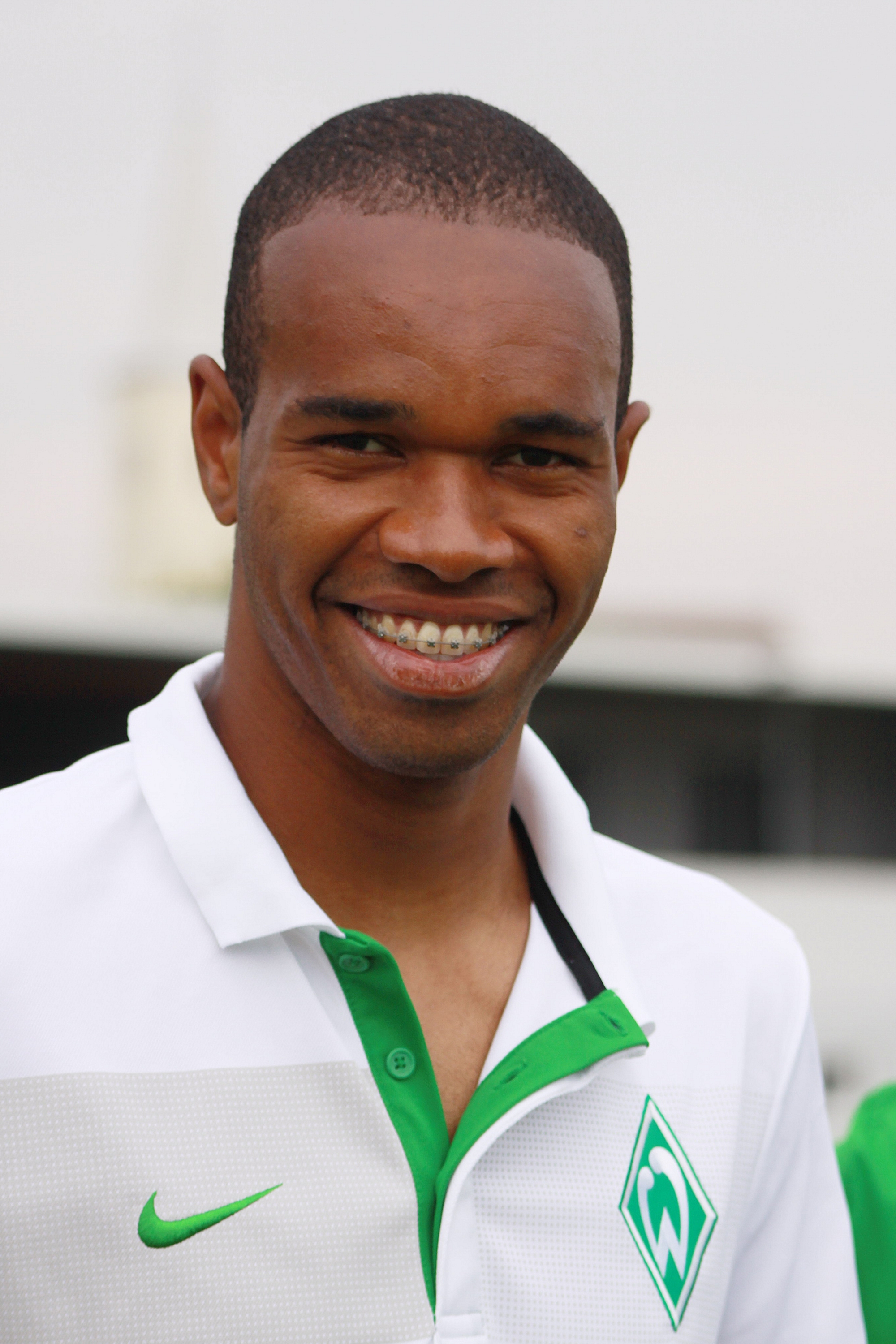
Naldo pictured in 2009.

At the start of the 2006–07 season, Naldo started the season well when he started two matches in the DFL-Ligapokal to win the tournament, including a 2–0 win against Bayern Munich in the final. Since the start of the 2006–07 season, Naldo continued to establish himself in the first team, playing in the centre–back position. He then helped Werder Bremen keep three clean sheets in three matches between 30 September 2006 and 18 October 2006, and scored two goals against Bochum and Levski Sofia along the way. A week later on 27 October 2006, Naldo scored his third goal of the season, in a 6–1 win against Mainz 05. Naldo scored a hat-trick against Eintracht Frankfurt, which ended as a 6–2 win for Werder Bremen on 9 December 2006 and became the only defender to score a hat trick in the Bundesliga. This was followed up by scoring his seventh goal of the season, in a 2–1 win against Wolfsburg. On 14 February 2007, he scored his eighth goal of the season, in a 3–1 win against Ajax in the first leg of UEFA Cup Round of 32. In the return leg, Naldo helped the club reach the next round despite losing 3–1 in the second leg. He then helped Werder Bremen keep six consecutive clean sheets between 14 March 2007 and 8 April 2007, including two UEFA Cup matches against Celta de Vigo and AZ Alkmaar. Naldo played in both legs of the UEFA Cup semi–finals against Espanyol, as the club lost 5–1 on aggregate. On 10 May 2007, he signed a contract extension with Werder Bremen, keeping him until 2012. With the club chasing the league title, Naldo, however, scored an own goal, in a 2–1 loss against Eintracht Frankfurt, putting Werder Bremen out of the title race and went on to finish third place in the league, resulting in the club's UEFA Champions League qualifying next season. Just as in his first season, Naldo played in all but two of Bremen's Bundesliga games in 2006–07 season, as well as in every European fixture, making a total of forty–nine appearances and scoring eight times in all competitions. For his performance, he was named 2006–07 season's kicker Team of the Season.

At the start of the 2007–08 season, Naldo continued to remain in the first team spotlight, where he formed a partnership with Per Mertesacker. Naldo played in both of the UEFA Champions League Play–Off Rounds against Dinamo Zagreb, as Werder Bremen won 5–3 on aggregate. During a 3–0 loss against Borussia Dortmund on 14 September 2007, he was involved in a legal action by the opposition team after he was kicked Jakub Błaszczykowski, but avoided consequences. On 27 October 2007, Naldo scored his first goal of the season in a 1–1 draw against Schalke 04. This was followed up by helping the club keep four clean sheets in the next four matches domestically, and scored against Karlsruher SC along the way. However, he was sent–off in the 70th minute for a professional foul on Stanislav Šesták, as Werder Bremen lost 2–1 against VfL Bochum on 3 February 2008. Following this, Naldo served a two match suspension. Amid to his suspension, he played in both legs of the UEFA Cup Round of 32 against Braga and scored in the first leg, as his contributions saw the club through to the next round following 4–0 win on aggregate. The following month, Naldo was involved in an incident at training after clashing with Boubacar Sanogo, but Werder Bremen's manager Schaaf played down the incident. Naldo scored his fourth goal of the season and set up a goal for the club's first goal of the game, in a 6–1 win against Hannover 96 on 10 May 2008. In the last game of the season against Bayer Leverkusen, he helped the club win 1–0, resulting in Werder Bremen finishing second place in the league, as well as, the club qualifying for the UEFA Champions League qualifying next season. In his third season at Werder Bremen, Naldo played in all but two of the club's Bundesliga games in the 2007–08 season, due to suspension, and in all their Champions League fixtures, along with two in Champions League qualifiers, making a total of forty–seven appearances and scoring four times in all competitions. For his performance, he was named 2007–08 season's kicker Team of the Season for the second time.

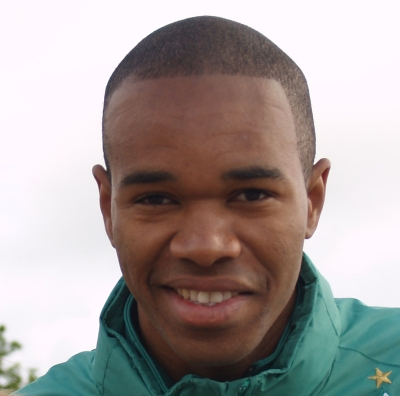
Naldo pictured in 2007.

At the start of the 2008–09 season, Naldo continued to remain in the first team spotlight, where he formed a partnership with Mertesacker. In a match against Bayern Munich on 20 September 2008, he scored his first goal of the season with his right foot in a 5–2 win, making it the first time Bremen won at the Allianz Arena. Throughout the season, the club came under criticism over conceding goals constantly. Amid to the criticism, Naldo scored his second goal of the season, in a 3–1 win against FC Köln on 16 November 2008. However in a match against Bayern Munich on 1 March 2009, he was sent–off in the 15th minute for a professional foul on Bastian Schweinsteiger, as Werder Bremen drew 0–0. After the match, it was announced that Naldo would be serving a three match suspension. While serving a suspension, he scored the only goal in the first leg win over Saint-Étienne in the last sixteen of the UEFA Cup. In the return leg, Naldo started the whole game to help the club draw 2–2, resulting in Werder Bremen advancing to the next round. He returned to the starting line–up against Hannover 96 on 5 April 2009 and helped the club win 4–1. Three weeks later on 25 April 2009, Naldo scored his fourth goal of the season, in a 3–2 win against VfL Bochum. He played three times against Hamburg in the semi–finals of both the DFB–Pokal and UEFA Cup that saw Werder Bremen through to the finals. In the UEFA Cup Final against Shakhtar Donetsk, Naldo started the match and scored an equalising goal to level the game at 1–1, however, his team went on to lose the game 2–1 after extra time. After the match, he was seen crying uncontrollably over the defeat. Tens days after the loss, Naldo started in the DFB-Pokal Final against Bayer Leverkusen and helped the club win 1–0 to win the DFB-Pokal. After the match, newspaper Der Spiegel praised his performance and even calling him "one of the best central defenders in Europe. Fast, safe on the ball, strong on the ball, strong on the shot. Showed a bit of everything that evening, plus an almost momentous blunder in the first half." Despite suffering injuries throughout the 2008–09 season, he played in all but six of Bremen's Bundesliga games in 2008–09 season, in seven of their eight Champions League fixtures, and all of the UEFA Cup fixtures, making the total of forty–seven appearances and scoring five times in all competitions.

Ahead of the 2009–10 season, Naldo was linked with a move to Ligue 1 side Marseille. Amid to his future at Werder Bremen, he helped the club win the German Supercup against VfL Wolfsburg by beating the opposition team 2–1. Naldo started the season well when he scored his first goal of the season, in a 5–0 win over Union Berlin. However, Naldo suffered a thigh injury and missed the first two matches of the opening season. Upon his return, Naldo scored two goals in two matches, with both games a victory against Borussia Mönchengladbach and Hertha BSC. He played in both legs of the UEFA Europa League's play–offs round against FC Aktobe and scored twice in the first leg, as Werder Bremen won 8–3 on aggregate to advance to the next round. On 10 September 2009, Naldo signed a contract extension with the club, keeping him until 2013, as manager Thomas Schaaf was delighted to keep the player, even considered him as a key player. He helped Werder Bremen keep five consecutive clean sheets in the league between 13 September 2009 and 17 October 2009. Since returning from injury, Naldo regained his first team place, forming a centre–back partnership with Mertesacker once again. He later added five more goals, including two separate matches against Athletic Bilbao in the UEFA Europa League. Naldo then scored two goals in two matches between 9 February 2010 and 13 February 2010 against Hannover 96 and 1899 Hoffenheim. Two weeks later on 25 February 2010, he scored his thirteen goal of the season to help the club beat Twente in the return leg of the UEFA Europa League Round of 32, having overturned the deficit. On 20 March 2010, Naldo captained Werder Bremen for the first time against Bochum and provided an assist to one of the goals in a 3–2 win. In a follow–up against FC Augsburg, he helped the club reach the final of the DFB-Pokal after beating the opposition team 2–0. In the final against Bayern Munich, Naldo started in the central defence with Per Mertesacker, as Werder Bremen lost 4–0. Despite missing one match during the 2009–10 season, he went on to make forty–eight appearances and scoring thirteen appearances in all competitions. For his performance, Naldo was named 2009–10 season's kicker Team of the Season for the third time.

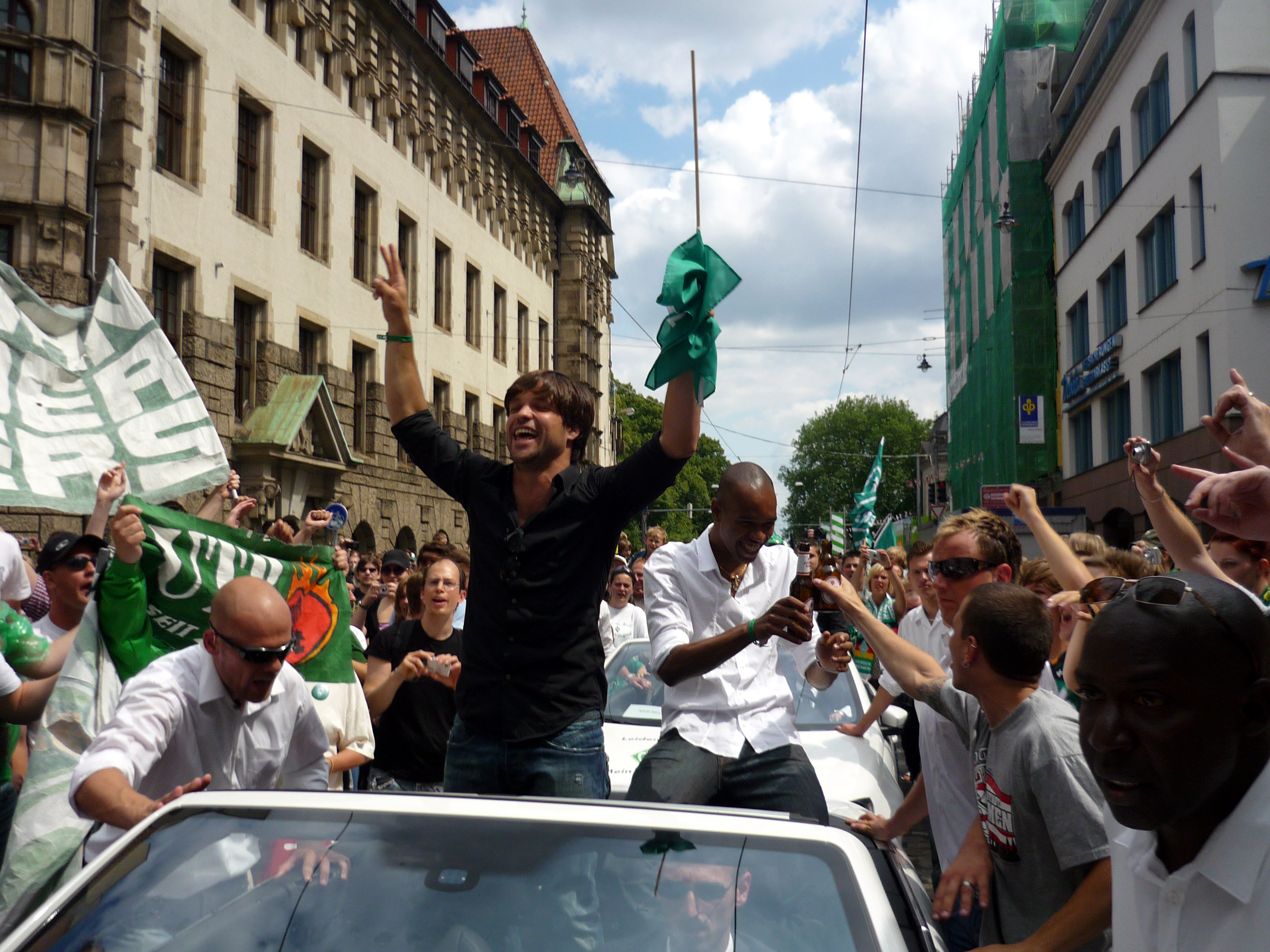
Naldo celebrates with Diego after winning the DFB-Pokal for the first time in 2008–09 season.

I will never forget returning to the pitch after my serious injury. It was on my birthday and it was against Hamburg, so it was a derby. The whole stadium stood up and shouted my name - it was a very special day for me. I'm a positive person and I knew I would come back. I fought and overcame the injury. An injury is nothing though when you see how many people are in hospital fighting for their lives. What are three months out when others are battling cancer? We have to think that way - that's why an injury is never really that bad.

— Naldo in 2018, looking on his return to league action

However, ahead of the 2010–11 season, Naldo began to have problems with a bone edema his the right knee that began to affect his season. As a result, Naldo was sidelined for several weeks. However, he was eventually sidelined that saw him not play for the rest of the year. By January, Naldo went back to his country, Brazil to have a surgery on his knee after Werder Bremen decided against having a surgery in Germany, having previously done, which were unsuccessful. Following an operation in Brazil, the Brazilian doctors revealed that he has a damaged cartilage on his right knee. This injury would take at least nine months to recover, resulting in him out for the rest of the 2010–11 season. The Brazilian doctors expressed concerns that his cartilage damage could later lead to other knee problems. Naldo commented about his injury, saying: "I am making progress, but when I can make my comeback is still uncertain."

Ahead of the 2011–12 season, Naldo made his return to training for the first time in a year and only "completed a light session with the ball" before being able to return to full training. He made his comeback in mid-August 2011, appearing for Werder Bremen in a friendly match against St. Pauli. A month later on 11 September 2011 against Hamburg, Naldo subsequently returned to Bundesliga action, coming on as an 86th-minute substitute, in a late minute 2–0 Nordderby win, which was his first appearance back from injury in sixteen months. Following this, he found himself in and out of the starting line–up in the next seven matches. In an interview with Kreiszeitung Syke, Naldo said that he was pleased with overcoming his injury nightmare, and felt happy on his return. After missing one match due to a flu, Naldo returned to the starting line–up against Stuttgart on 27 November 2011 and scored his first goal of the season from a free kick, in a 2–0 win. After making three more starts by the end of the year, he injured his knee ligament and was sidelined for months. During the recovery, Naldo was linked with a return to Brazil, as supposedly Internacional and Porto Alegre Futebol Clube were interested in signing him. It came after when he wanted to leave Werder Bremen, citing homesickness. Ultimately, Naldo stayed at the club after being convinced to stay by Manager Thomas Schaaf. By February, he made his return to full training following his recovery on his knee. Naldo made his return to the first team against Mainz 05 on 31 March 2012, coming on as a 51st-minute substitute, in a 3–0 loss. After missing one match due to a torn muscle fibre, he scored on his return, in a 2–2 draw against Borussia Mönchengladbach on 10 April 2012. A week later on 21 April 2012, Naldo scored his third goal of the season, in a 2–1 loss against Bayern Munich. At the end of the 2011–12 season, he went on to make eighteen appearances and scoring three times in all competitions.

=== Wolfsburg ===
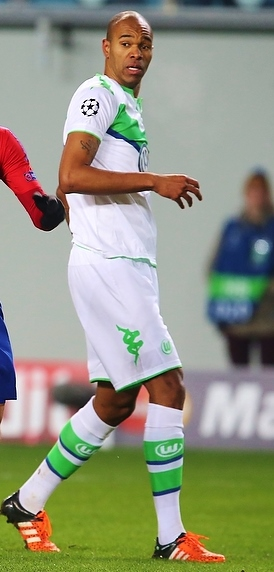
Naldo playing for VfL Wolfsburg against CSKA Moscow in the UEFA Champions League in 2015.

On 18 July 2012, Naldo moved to Wolfsburg on a four-year contract for a fee of €3 million, which would rise to €4m. He previously reiterated his desire to return to Brazil before deciding to stay in Germany.

Naldo made his competitive debut for the club, starting the whole game, in a 5–0 win over Schönberg 95 and setting a goal for Ivica Olić, who would score a hat-trick in the first round of DFB-Pokal. He made his league debut for Wolfsburg, starting the whole game, in a 1–0 win over Stuttgart in the opening game of the season. Since joining the club, Naldo quickly established himself in the starting eleven, playing in the centre–back position. However during a 3–0 loss against Bayern Munich on 25 September 2012, he suffered a bruised ribs that saw him substituted in the 67th minute. But Naldo made a quick recovery and returned to the starting line–up against Mainz 05 on 30 September 2012. However, his performance was criticised by manager Felix Magath. Shortly after the criticism, Magath would be sacked after only five points in eight matches (and no goals and points in the last four games). On 18 November 2012, he scored his first goal for the club in a 3–1 win over TSG 1899 Hoffenheim. Three weeks later on 8 December 2012, Naldo scored his second goal for Wolfsburg, in a 3–2 win against Borussia Dortmund. He later scored three more goals later in the 2012–13 season, coming against Augsburg, Mainz, Hoffenheim and Borussia Dortmund. Despite missing out three matches, due to a hamstring injury in the 2012–13 season, Naldo finished his first season at the club, making thirty–six appearances and scoring six times in all competitions.

Ahead of the 2013–14 season, Naldo said about the new season, saying: "I am convinced that we will be much better. We have to attack, but on the outside we should be a little more cautious. We don't have to talk about it so much, we have to show what our goals are on the pitch." Since the start of the 2013–14 season, he continued to establish himself in the first team, playing in the centre–back position and formed a centre–back partnership with Robin Knoche. Naldo scored his first goal of the season in a 4–0 win over Schalke 04 on 17 August 2013. After the match, he was named the league's Team of the Week. Naldo scored his second goal of the season, in a 2-1 win over Ingolstadt 04 in the fourth round of DFB-Pokal. Three months later on 8 March 2014, he scored again, which was Wolfsburg's only goal in the game, in a 6-1 loss against Bayern Munich. His performance led to speculation that the club is planning to offer Naldo a new contract. Following the absence of captain Diego Benaglio, Naldo captained Wolfsburg for the first time against Eintracht Frankfurt on 29 March 2014 and scored his fourth goal of the season, in a 2–1 win. Following this, he captained the next four matches until Benaglio return. Despite missing two matches later in the 2013–14 season, Naldo went on to make thirty–eight appearances and scoring four times in all competitions. Shortly after, he signed a new two-year contract extension with the club, keeping him until 2016.

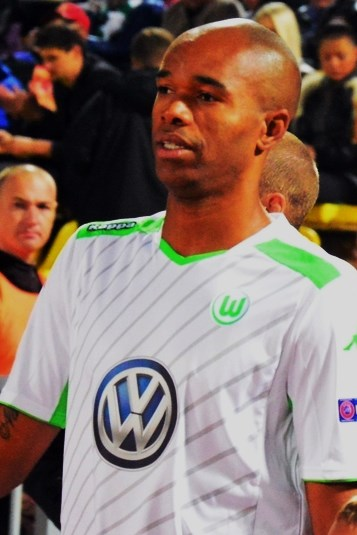
Naldo playing for VfL Wolfsburg against Krasnodar in the UEFA Europa League in 2012.

At the start of the 2014–15 season, Naldo captained Wolfsburg's first three matches of the season in the absence of Benaglio, including scoring his first goal of the season, in a 2–2 draw against Eintracht Frankfurt. He continued to establish himself in the starting eleven, forming a centre–back partnership with Knoche once again. In a match against FC Augsburg on 5 October 2014, Naldo scored the club's only goal of the game, in a 1–0 win. After the match, he spoke about his happiness on keeping a clean sheet for the first time this season. Three weeks later on 26 October 2014 against Mainz 05, Naldo scored the opening game of the game and set up Wolfsburg's second goal of the game, in a 3–0 win. He then scored two goals in two matches between 17 December 2014 and 20 December 2014 against Borussia Dortmund and 1. FC Köln. His next goal for the club came on 14 February 2015 against Bayer Leverkusen, scoring from a free kick, in a 5–4 win. A month later on 12 March 2015, Naldo scored in the UEFA Europa League round of sixteen match, in a 3–1 win over Inter Milan; Wolfsburg went through to the next round. He scored his eighth goal of the season, in a 2–1 win against Borussia Dortmund on 16 May 2015. Naldo then played the whole 90 minutes in the DFB-Pokal Final against Borussia Dortmund and was involved in an assist that led Luiz Gustavo scoring an equaliser, with Wolfsburg eventually winning 3–1 for their first cup honour. Despite missing two matches later in the 2014–15 season, he went on to make forty–nine appearances and scoring eight times in all competitions.

At the start of the 2015–16 season, Naldo was given the captaincy following Benaglio's absence. He played 120 minutes as captain in the DFL-Supercup against Bayern Munich, as Wolfsburg won 5–4 on penalty shootout. Naldo captained the club in the next three matches. After Benaglio's return from his absence and resumed his captain duty, he helped Wolfsburg keep four clean sheets between 28 August 2015 and 19 September 2015. Since the start of the 2015–16 season, he continued to establish himself in the starting eleven, forming a centre–back partnership with Knoche once again. On 21 November 2015, Naldo signed a contract extension with the club for another year, having played twenty matches so far. He helped Wolfsburg keep three clean sheets in three matches between 21 November 2015 and 29 November 2015. Two weeks later on 8 December 2015, Naldo scored two goals, in a 3–2 win over Manchester United, which saw the opposition team eliminated from the Champions League. He captained two more times for Wolfsburg before suffering a shoulder injury during a 2–0 loss against Bayern Munich on 2 March 2016. Following this, Naldo underwent a successful operation on his shoulder and was expected to be out for the rest of the 2015–16 season. But he made a recovery from his injury and returned to the starting line–up against Real Madrid in the first leg of the UEFA Champions League quarter–finals, winning 2–0. Following this, Naldo captained three more matches in the remaining matches of the 2015–16 season, as he helped the club finish eighth place in the league. At the end of the 2015–16 season, Naldo went on to make forty appearances and scoring two times in all competitions.

Following this, the club's sporting director Klaus Allofs revealed that he offered the player a two–year contract and a guarantee of him being appointed as a new captain. Upon leaving Wolfsburg, however, Naldo voiced his criticism of the club's sporting director Klaus Allofs for not giving him a new contract at Wolfsburg.

=== Schalke 04 ===
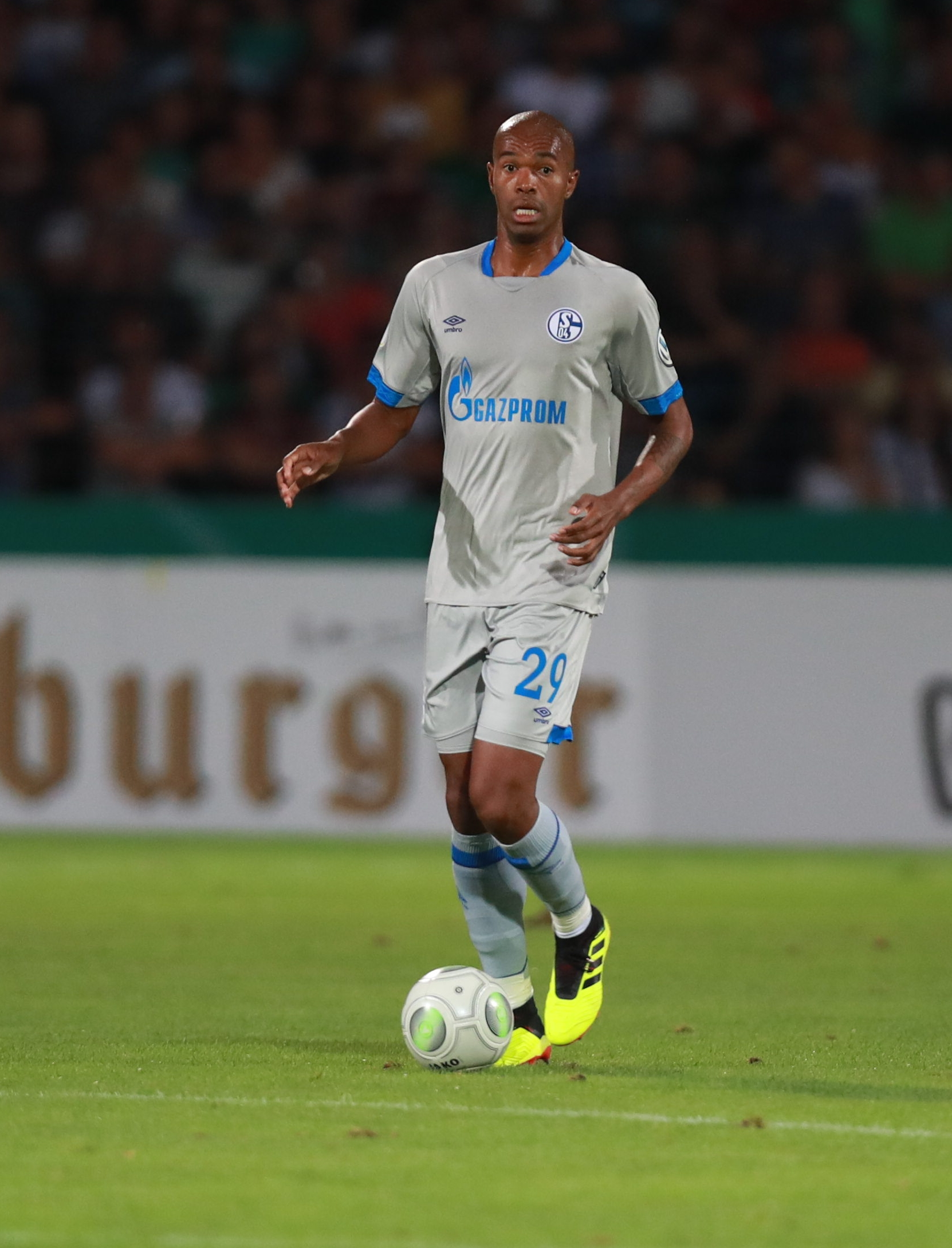
Naldo dribbling during the DFB–Pokal match against FC Schweinfurt 05 on 17 August 2018.

On 15 May 2016, it was announced that Naldo would join Schalke 04 on a two-year deal, after his contract with Wolfsburg expired. He was previously linked with a move to Premier League club Manchester United before joining Schalke 04. Upon joining the club, he cited lack of trust was factor of him leaving Wolfsburg. Naldo was also given Schalke 04’s vice captaincy ahead of the new season.

Naldo made his debut for the club, starting the whole game, in a 4–1 win against FC 08 Villingen in the first round of the DFB–Pokal. Since joining Schalke 04, he quickly established himself in the starting eleven and found himself rotated in a centre–back position, competing with Matija Nastasić and Benedikt Höwedes. This came after when his performance came under criticism. Despite suffering a back problem, Naldo was able to make his 300th Bundesliga appearance against Bayern Munich on 9 September 2016, as the club lost 2–0. He helped Schalke 04 keep four clean sheets between 20 October 2016 and 3 November 2016, including two against Krasnodor in the UEFA Europa League matches. After missing one match due to a muscular problem, Naldo returned to the starting line–up against Bayer Leverkusen on 11 December 2016, only to be sent–off for a 4th minute for a foul on Javier Hernández, as the club lost 1–0. After the match, he served a two match suspension. Naldo returned to the starting line–up against Ingolstadt 04 on 21 January 2017 and helped Schalke 04 keep a clean sheet, in a 1–0 win. Two weeks later on 4 February 2017, he scored his first goal for the club, in a 1–1 draw against Bayern Munich. In a follow–up match against SV Sandhausen, Naldo scored his second goal for Schalke 04, in a 4–1 win to advance to the next round of the DFB–Pokal. However, in a 1–1 draw against PAOK that saw the club through to the next round in the return leg of the UEFA Europa League Round of 32, he suffered a partial tear in the adductor area. After the match, it was announced that Naldo would be sidelined for the rest of the 2016–17 season. Despite there's a chance that he could return before the end of the season, Naldo eventually made his return to the starting line–up in the last game of the season against Ingolstadt 04, as Schalke 04 drew 1–1. At the end of the 2016–17 season, he went on to make twenty–nine appearances and scoring two times in all competitions.

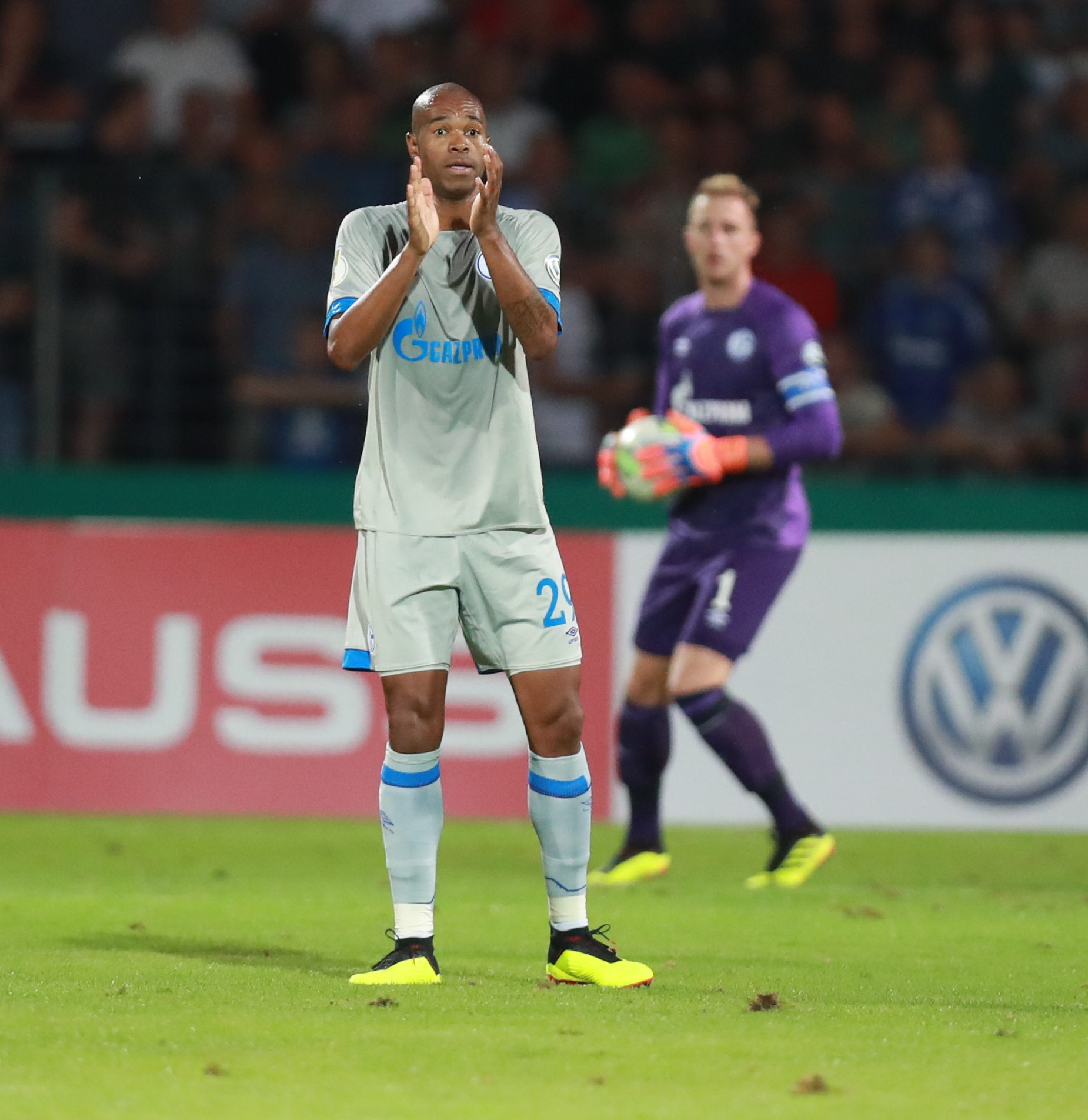
Naldo giving out instructions during the DFB–Pokal match against FC Schweinfurt 05 on 17 August 2018.

Ahead of the 2017–18 season, Naldo said he demanded more seriousness and discipline from the young players. Naldo was linked a move return to Wolfsburg but ended up staying at Schalke 04. Since the start of the 2017–18 season, Naldo continued to establish himself in the starting eleven and formed in a centre–back partnership with Nastasić and Thilo Kehrer. He scored his first goal of the season on his 35th birthday, in a 3–1 win against Stuttgart on 10 September 2017. Naldo scored a header in the last minute of the game to help Schalke 04 drew 4–4 against rivals, Borussia Dortmund on 25 November 2017. On 7 December 2017, he signed a one–year contract extension with the club, keeping him until 2019. Naldo then scored two goals in two matches between 16 December 2017 and 13 January 2018 against Eintracht Frankfurt and RB Leipzig. For his performance, he was named Schalke 04’s Player of the Month for November and December. Two weeks later on 27 January 2018, Naldo scored his fifth goal of the season, in a 2–0 win against Stuttgart. He helped the club keep five consecutive clean sheets between 25 February 2018 and 31 March 2018. This was followed up by scoring in the next two matches against Hamburg and Borussia Dortmund. Naldo, once again, was voted Schalke 04’s Player of the Month for April. He made his 350th appearance in the league, coming against FC Augsburg on 5 May 2018, as the club won 2–1. Despite missing one matches throughout the 2017–18 season, Naldo went on to make thirty–nine appearances and scoring seven times in all competitions. For his performance, he was named 2017–18 season's kicker Team of the Season for the fourth time. Naldo went on to win the league's ‘Outfield Player of the Season’. He also came third in the race for the German award of Footballer of the Year, finishing behind Nils Petersen and Toni Kroos.

At the start of the 2018–19 season, Naldo was appointed as Schalke 04’s vice–captain by Manager Tedesco. However, he made a poor start to the season, with the club only won once in the first five matches of the season. As a result, Naldo found himself in and out of the starting line–up, which saw him placed on the substitute bench. Manager Tedesco defended his decision to leave out the player on the starting line–up, saying: "He [Naldo] was spared. When you see the intensity of the previous games against Porto and Bayern, it makes sense not to let a 36-year-old play three games in a week." Despite this, he helped Schalke 04 keep two consecutive clean sheets between 3 October 2018 and 6 October 2018 against Lokomotiv Moscow and Fortuna Düsseldorf. On 17 October 2018, Naldo signed a contract extension with the club, keeping him until 2020. Shortly after, he captained Schalke 04 for the first time against his former club, Werder Bremen on 20 October 2018, as the club lost 2–0. A week later against 1. FC Köln in the second round of the DFB–Pokal, Naldo captained Schalke 04 for the second time this season and helped the club win 6–5 in a penalty shootout following a 1–1 draw. By the time he left Schalke 04, Naldo made thirteen appearances in all competitions.

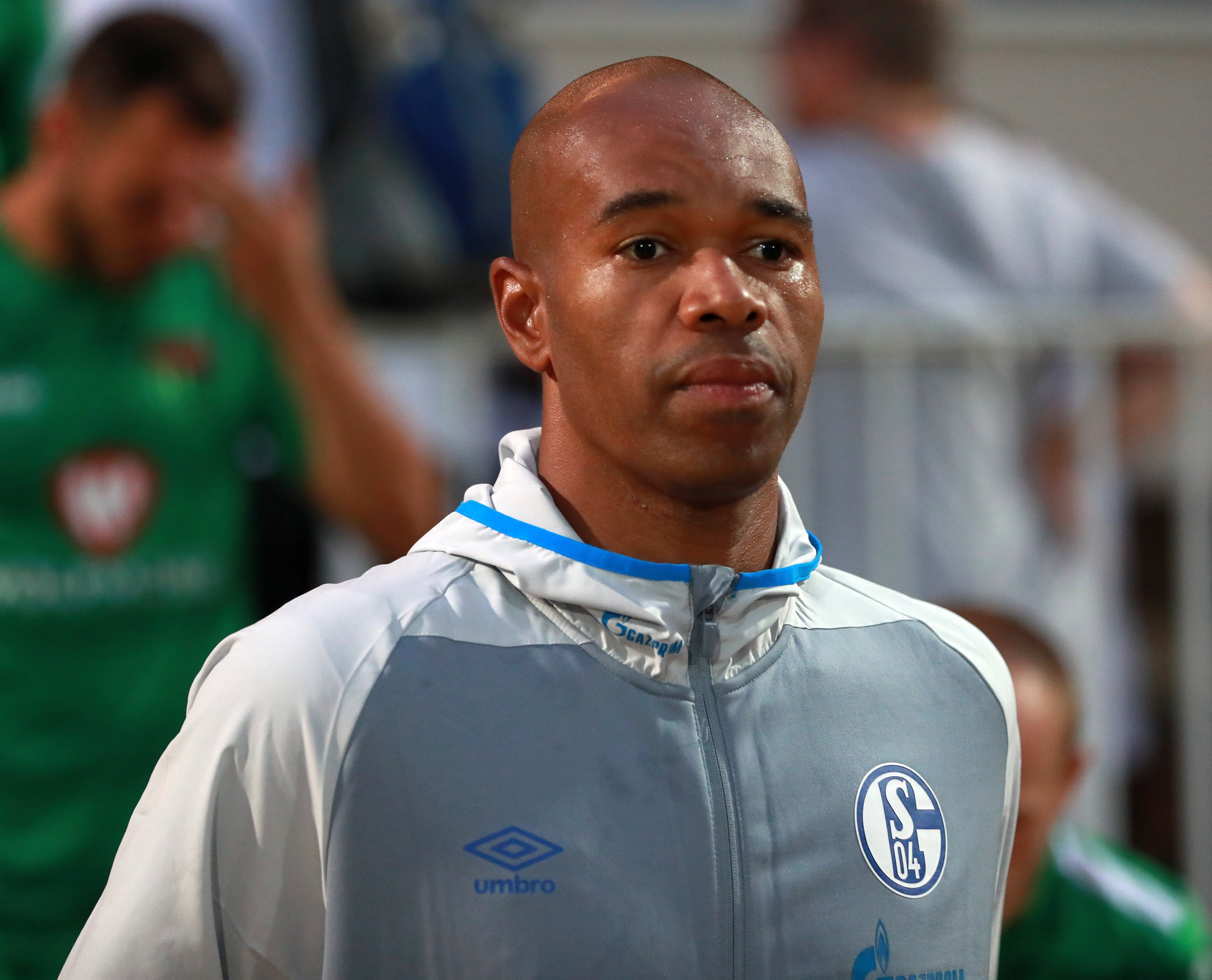
Naldo warming up prior to a match DFB–Pokal against FC Schweinfurt 05 on 17 August 2018.

=== Monaco ===
On 3 January 2019, Naldo joined Ligue 1 club Monaco on a one-and-a-half-year deal. After the transfer was completed, Schalke 04’s executive manager Christian Heidel revealed that Manager Thierry Henry played a role to convince the player to join the club. However, his wife later criticised Schalke 04 on her social media account, for their poor treatment of Naldo. This prompted the club's executive manager Christian Heidel to respond to her post, saying: "I don't read any posts, neither from our players nor their wives. I care what he [Naldo] says. And everything is fine."

He made his debut for Monaco, starting the whole game, and kept a clean sheet, in a 1–0 win against Canet Roussillon in the third round of the Coupe de France. In his first two league games for the club, Naldo received a red card when he was sent off twice in seven days against Strasbourg and Dijon. Even after serving his suspensions, he remained out of the starting line–up for the next three months. Naldo did not make an appearance until on 1 May 2019, coming on as a 63rd-minute substitute, in a 2–2 draw against Rennes. Following this, he had a first team run ins that saw AS Monaco avoided relegation. At the end of the 2018–19 season, Naldo went on to make nine appearances in all competitions.

After playing no competitive match in the 2019–20 season, his contract with Monaco was terminated on 17 January 2020. Following his release, Naldo was linked a move return to Werder Bremen, but the club responded that they have no intentions of signing him. He was also linked with a move back to his homeland country when Caxias do Sul linked on signing him but the move never happened. Having failed to find a club in six months, Naldo said in an interview that if he failed to find a club by October, he will retire from professional football.

== International career ==
In March 2007, Naldo was called up to the Brazil squad for the first time by his then the national team's manager Dunga, but did not play. Two months later on 17 May 2007, he was called up to Brazil's provisional squad for the Copa América.

Naldo made his full debut in England's first match at the new Wembley Stadium on 1 June 2007 as they drew 1–1 with England. Four days later on 5 June 2007, he made his second appearance for the national team against Turkey and kept a clean sheet in a 0–0 draw. The next day, Naldo made the final cut for the Brazil squad for the Copa América. He made his first appearance of the tournament, coming on as a 73rd-minute substitute for Juan, in a 6–1 win against Chile in the quarter–finals to advance to the next round. Despite making only one appearance in the Copa América, Brazil went on to win the tournament, once again defeating Argentina in the final.

Following the end of the Copa América, Naldo was called up to the national team squad a month later. He made his third appearance for Brazil against Algeria on 22 August 2007 and kept a clean sheet, as the national team won 2–0. The next two years saw Naldo being called up by the national football team numerous times, but did not play.

Having not been called up to the Brazil since 2009, Naldo said he was open to be included in the national team squad for the 2014 FIFA World Cup in his homeland country and 2018 FIFA World Cup in Russia. However, Naldo was never included in the squad for Brazil.

== Style of play ==
Naldo played as a versatile two-footed central defender. He stands at 1.98 metres tall and this height, combined with his jumping and heading ability, made him a big threat in aerial contests. He was also well known for his set piece skill and according to Dunga, who coached him at the 2007 Copa América, he could hit the ball in excess of 60 mph using the cannonball free kick method, associated with other fellow Brazilians such as Roberto Carlos, Alex, David Luiz and Adriano. Furthermore, he was capable of playing across the back line.

During his time at Werder Bremen, he was the club's fan favourite in the regular team. During his first few weeks at Bremen, fans likened him to an Ox due to his immense height and athletic build, as a result he was nicknamed The Beast, a name shared with players Júlio Baptista, Jonathan Parkin, Brian Jensen and Adebayo Akinfenwa. His teammate Tim Wiese described him as the best central defender in the league. His manager at Werder Bremen, Thomas Schaaf, described him as "probably the most talented defender in Brazil".

His performance in the 2017–18 season led the German media praise his performance despite playing at age 35 at the time. Naldo later credited Manager Domenico Tedesco for giving him self-confidence, and even calling him the best manager he ever had.

== Post-playing career ==
On 30 September 2020, Naldo returned to Schalke 04 as a coaching staff member and upon doing so, he announced his retirement from professional football. Six days later, Naldo was critical of the club's performances in the 2020–21 season. Naldo said in an interview on why he wanted to become a coach, saying: "Let's put it this way: It wasn't my primary goal. I thought for a long time whether I might become a consultant. But now I'm here at Schalke and I'm happy about it. I learn something new every day, I have a lot of fun."

Naldo revealed that he used to play as a striker, saying: "I used to play a striker when I was younger, so something must have stuck. My uncle was also a striker, my father played in midfield. I've grown, and at some point I was better off with my 1.98 meters behind. That's a good thing."

== Personal life ==
Naldo is a devout Christian and has a large back-piece tattoo depicting Jesus on the cross with two angels on either side, one holding a guitar the other holding a heart. Over the tattoo it says in Portuguese "De Todo o Nos Livrai time Amém" ("Deliver us from evil, Amen"). The tattoo was done by Frank Kassebaum and describing it Naldo states "I am very religious, and have faith in God. It is to my family and will always protect me." In addition, Naldo has the names of his wife Carla and his son Naldinho tattooed on his forearms.

Naldo is married to his wife, Bento Goncalvense Carla Paludo in 2007. Together, they have two children, Naldinho (born in 2005) and Liz (born in 2009). He spoke about adaptation in Germany, saying in the interview in 2009: "In Rio Grande do Sul, I had a chance and I was recognized. My adaptation in Germany was very good, as soon as I arrived I became the team's holder, and I demonstrated on the field that I was adapted. Outside of it, everything went very well too, my son he was born here and my wife identifies with German culture." In December 2014, Naldo received German citizenship, having lived in the country since 2005. Naldo stated two years ago that he wanted to apply for a German passport. Like Naldo, his wife also obtained a German citizenship. Having lived in Düsseldorf, Naldo moved to France, with his children continuing to go to school in the country, even after leaving AS Monaco.

As well as his native Portuguese, Naldo is fluent in German having started learning the language when he first moved to Germany in 2005. In March 2016, he and fellow Bundesliga defender Sebastian Langkamp handed out the awards at the Berlin-based 11mm Film Festival.

In June 2013, Naldo spoke out about the protest in Brazil, supporting the protestors, saying: "The people here love football. The protest is directed against politics and not against the FIFA World Cup itself. I think the protests are good and important. It is right to demonstrate for a fairer Brazil so that everyone is better off. Brazil needs more clinics and schools. More money has to flow into the social system." In March 2017, he was appointed as the integration sponsor of the Bundesliga Foundation.

Naldo said he does not drink alcohol, preferring to drink water.

== Career statistics ==
Appearances and goals by club, season and competition
Club	Season	League			National Cup		League Cup		Continental		Other		Total	
Club	Season	Division	Apps	Goals	Apps	Goals	Apps	Goals	Apps	Goals	Apps	Goals	Apps	Goals
Juventude	2004	Série A	25	4	0	0	—		—		—		25	4
Juventude	2005	Série A	9	4	2	0	—		—		—		11	4
Juventude	Total		34	8	2	0	—		—		—		36	8
Werder Bremen	2005–06	Bundesliga	32	2	4	1	0	0	9	0	—		45	3
Werder Bremen	2006–07	Bundesliga	32	6	1	0	2	0	14	2	—		49	8
Werder Bremen	2007–08	Bundesliga	32	3	3	0	0	0	12	1	—		47	4
Werder Bremen	2008–09	Bundesliga	28	3	5	0	—		14	2	—		47	5
Werder Bremen	2009–10	Bundesliga	31	5	6	3	—		11	5	—		50	13
Werder Bremen	2010–11	Bundesliga	0	0	0	0	—		0	0	—		0	0
Werder Bremen	2011–12	Bundesliga	18	3	0	0	—		0	0	—		18	3
Werder Bremen	Total		173	22	19	4	2	0	60	10	—		254	36
VfL Wolfsburg	2012–13	Bundesliga	31	6	5	0	—		—		—		36	6
VfL Wolfsburg	2013–14	Bundesliga	33	3	5	1	—		—		—		38	4
VfL Wolfsburg	2014–15	Bundesliga	32	7	6	0	—		11	1	—		49	8
VfL Wolfsburg	2015–16	Bundesliga	29	0	2	0	—		8	2	1 (Note: Appearance in DFL-Supercup)	0	40	2
VfL Wolfsburg	Total		125	16	18	1	—		19	3	1	0	163	20
Schalke 04	2016–17	Bundesliga	19	1	3	1	—		7	0	—		29	2
Schalke 04	2017–18	Bundesliga	34	7	4	0	—		—		—		38	7
Schalke 04	2018–19	Bundesliga	7	0	2	0	—		4	0	—		13	0
Schalke 04	Total		60	8	9	1	—		11	0	—		80	9
Monaco	2018–19	Ligue 1	7	0	1	0	1	0	—		—		9	0
Monaco	2019–20	Ligue 1	0	0	0	0	0	0	—		—		0	0
Monaco	Total		7	0	1	0	1	0	—		—		9	0
Career total			399	54	49	6	3	0	90	13	1	0	542	73

== Honours ==
Werder Bremen

- DFB-Ligapokal: 2006
- DFB-Pokal: 2008–09
- DFL-Supercup: 2009 (unofficial)

VfL Wolfsburg

- DFB-Pokal: 2014–15
- DFL-Supercup: 2015

Brazil

- Copa América: 2007

Individual

- Bundesliga Team of the Season: 2017–18
- kicker Bundesliga Team of the Season: 2006–07, 2007–08, 2009–10, 2017–18
