= Jurica Vranješ =

Croatian footballer (born 1980)

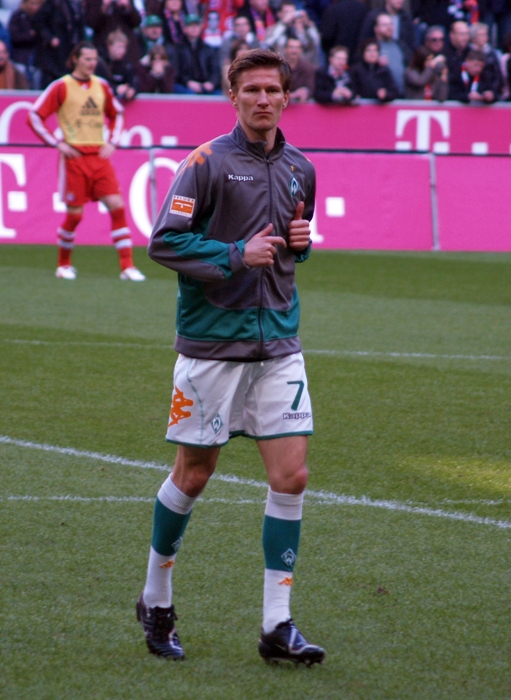
- Vranješ with Werder Bremen in 2007

Personal information
- Date of birth: 31 January 1980 (age 46)
- Place of birth: Osijek, SR Croatia, Yugoslavia
- Height: 1.84 m (6 ft 0 in)
- Position: Midfielder

Youth career
- –1997: NK Osijek

Senior career*
Years	Team	Apps	(Gls)
1997–2000	Osijek	54	(10)
2000–2003	Bayer Leverkusen	46	(0)
2003–2005	VfB Stuttgart	39	(0)
2005–2011	Werder Bremen	90	(5)
2009–2010	→ Gençlerbirliği (loan)	13	(0)
2011–2012	Aris Saloniki	2	(0)
2012	Rijeka	6	(0)
Total		250	(15)

International career
1995–1996	Croatia U-18	6	(2)
1997–1999	Croatia U-19	12	(5)
1998–1999	Croatia U-20	2	(0)
1999–2001	Croatia U-21	18	(0)
1999–2007	Croatia	26	(0)
- * Club domestic league appearances and goals

Jurica Vranješ (pronounced [ˈjuritsa ˈʋraɲɛʃ]; born 31 January 1980) is a Croatian former professional footballer. He was described as versatile midfielder, playing both as a defensive and a central midfielder, noted for his tackling and passing abilities.

== Club career ==
Vranješ was born in Osijek, Croatia. He started playing in NK Osijek where he played between 1997 and 1999. Some websites say Vranješ started his career at FK Vojvodina, but Vranješ himself explained how those websites confused their statistics with another player, Mićo Vranješ, playing back then in Vojvodina.

After playing with Osijek in the Prva HNL, he then moved to Bayer Leverkusen where he played three seasons until moving to VfB Stuttgart in 2003 and finally to Werder Bremen in 2005. In August 2009 Werder Bremen announced that he could leave the club. On 29 January 2010, he left Werder Bremen and was loaned to Gençlerbirliği for the rest of the season.

In September 2011, Vranješ joined Aris Saloniki He made his debut in the yellow jersey against Olympiacos. His contract was terminated on 10 January 2012. In May 2012, he joined Rijeka in Croatia, where he played six games before his contract with the club was terminated in November 2012.

== International career ==
Vranješ made his debut for Croatia in a June 1999 Korea Cup match against Egypt and earned a total of 26 caps, scoring no goals. He was part of the national team squad at the 2002 FIFA World Cup, where he played in two games. He also played in the Croatian team at the 1998 Under-18 European Championship when Croatia won the third place. His final international was an October 2007 friendly match against Slovakia.

== Career statistics ==
=== Club ===
Appearances and goals by club, season and competition
Club	Season	League			Cup		League Cup		Continental		Total	
Club	Season	Division	Apps	Goals	Apps	Goals	Apps	Goals	Apps	Goals	Apps	Goals
NK Osijek	1997–98	Prva HNL	14	1	1	0	–	–	–	–	15	1
NK Osijek	1998–99	Prva HNL	25	5	6	0	–	–	2	1	33	6
NK Osijek	1999–00	Prva HNL	15	4	1	0	–	–	2	0	18	4
NK Osijek	Total		54	10	8	0	0	0	4	1	66	11
Bayer Leverkusen	1999–00	Bundesliga	2	0	0	0	–	–	–	–	2	0
Bayer Leverkusen	2000–01	Bundesliga	21	0	4	0	–	–	5	0	30	0
Bayer Leverkusen	2001–02	Bundesliga	20	0	4	0	–	–	12	0	36	0
Bayer Leverkusen	2002–03	Bundesliga	4	0	2	0	–	–	2	0	8	0
Bayer Leverkusen	Total		47	0	10	0	0	0	19	0	76	0
Bayer Leverkusen II	2002–03	Regionalliga Nord	4	0	–	–	–	–	–	–	4	0
VfB Stuttgart	2003–04	Bundesliga	22	0	2	0	–	–	4	0	28	0
VfB Stuttgart	2004–05	Bundesliga	17	0	4	0	–	–	5	0	26	0
VfB Stuttgart	Total		39	0	6	0	0	0	9	0	54	0
Werder Bremen	2005–06	Bundesliga	29	1	3	0	–	–	4	0	36	1
Werder Bremen	2006–07	Bundesliga	25	4	1	0	–	–	9	0	38	4
Werder Bremen	2007–08	Bundesliga	22	0	3	0	–	–	6	0	31	0
Werder Bremen	2008–09	Bundesliga	14	0	2	1	–	–	2	0	18	1
Werder Bremen	2009–10	Bundesliga	0	0	0	0	1	0	0	0	1	0
Werder Bremen	Total		90	5	9	1	1	0	21	0	121	6
Gençlerbirliği	2009–10	Süper Lig	13	0	0	0	–	–	–	–	13	0
Aris FC	2011–12	Super League Greece	2	0	0	0	–	–	–	–	2	0
HNK Rijeka	2012–13	Prva HNL	6	0	0	0	–	–	–	–	6	0
Career total			276	15	31	1	1	0	53	1	361	17

=== International ===
Appearances and goals by national team and year
National team	Year	Apps	Goals
Croatia	1999	3	0
Croatia	2000	1	0
Croatia	2001	3	0
Croatia	2002	3	0
Croatia	2003	2	0
Croatia	2004	5	0
Croatia	2005	4	0
Croatia	2006	3	0
Croatia	2007	2	0
Total		26	0

== Honours ==
Osijek

- Croatian Cup: 1999

Bayer Leverkusen

- Bundesliga runner-up: 1999–00 2001–02
- DFB-Pokal runner-up: 2002
- UEFA Champions League runner-up: 2001–02

Werder Bremen

- Bundesliga runner-up: 2005–06, 2007–08
- DFB-Pokal: 2009
- DFL-Ligapokal: 2006
- DFL-Supercup: 2009
- UEFA Cup runner-up: 2008–09

Individual

- Croatian Footballer Hope of the Year: 1998
