= 2006 DFL-Ligapokal =

- Tournament programme cover

Tournament details
- Country: Germany
- Teams: 6

Final positions
- Champions: Werder Bremen
- Runners-up: Bayern Munich

Tournament statistics
- Matches played: 5
- Goals scored: 8 (1.6 per match)
- Top goal scorer: Ivan Klasnić (2)

The 2006 DFL-Ligapokal was the tenth edition of the DFL-Ligapokal. Werder Bremen won their first title, beating Bayern Munich 2–0 in the final.

== Participating clubs ==
A total of six teams qualified for the competition. The labels in the parentheses show how each team qualified for the place of its starting round:

- 1st, 2nd, 3rd, 4th, etc.: League position
- CW: Cup winners
- TH: Title holders

Semi-finals
Bayern Munich (1st + CW)	Werder Bremen (2nd)
Preliminary round
Hamburger SV (3rd)	Bayer Leverkusen (5th)
Schalke 04^{TH} (4th)	Hertha BSC (6th)

== Matches ==
=== Preliminary round ===
29 July 2006
20:00

Hamburger SV	1–0	Hertha BSC
Kompany 52'	Report

LTU-Arena, Düsseldorf
Attendance: 23,195
Referee: Peter Vink

29 July 2006
18:15

Schalke 04	1–1	Bayer Leverkusen
Bordon 37'	Report	Rodríguez 29' (o.g.)
Penalties
Bajramović (penalty missed); Boenisch (penalty scored); Rost (penalty missed); Kobiashvili (penalty scored); Larsen (penalty scored); Halil Altıntop (penalty scored); Løvenkrands (penalty scored); Hamit Altıntop (penalty scored); Baumjohann (penalty scored); Abel (penalty scored); Larsen (penalty scored)	9–8	(penalty scored) Babić; (penalty scored) Rolfes; (penalty missed) Barbarez; (penalty scored) Castro; (penalty missed) Butt; (penalty scored) Kießling; (penalty scored) Touré; (penalty scored) Madouni; (penalty scored) Ramelow; (penalty scored) Haggui; (penalty missed) Babić

LTU-Arena, Düsseldorf
Attendance: 23,195
Referee: Alain Hamer

=== Semi-finals ===
1 August 2006
20:30

Werder Bremen	2–1	Hamburger SV
Zidan 50'; Frings 82'	Report	Sanogo 70'

Weserstadion, Bremen
Attendance: 27,650
Referee: Thorsten Kinhöfer

2 August 2006
20:30

Bayern Munich	0–0	Schalke 04
	Report
Penalties
Scholl (penalty scored); Hargreaves (penalty scored); Santa Cruz (penalty scored); Sagnol (penalty scored)	4–1	(penalty missed) Boenisch; (penalty missed) Abel; (penalty scored) Løvenkrands

Allianz Arena, Munich
Attendance: 40,000
Referee: Lutz Wagner

=== Final ===
5 August 2006
18:00 CEST

Werder Bremen	2–0	Bayern Munich
Klasnić 29', 66'	Report

Zentralstadion, Leipzig
Attendance: 41,300
Referee: Manuel Gräfe (Berlin)

== See also ==
- 2006–07 Bundesliga
- 2006–07 DFB-Pokal
