= 2009–10 DFB-Pokal =

Tournament details
- Country: Germany
- Teams: 64

Final positions
- Champions: Bayern Munich
- Runners-up: Werder Bremen

Tournament statistics
- Matches played: 63
- Goals scored: 214 (3.4 per match)
- Top goal scorer(s): Lucas Barrios; Thomas Müller; Sahr Senesie (4 goals each)

The 2009–10 DFB-Pokal was the 67th season of the annual German football cup competition. The competition began with the first round on 31 July 2009 and ended on 15 May 2010 with the final, held at Olympiastadion in Berlin. Since the cup winner, Bayern Munich, completed the double by also winning the German championship, and the runner-up, Werder Bremen, qualified for the Champions League, VfB Stuttgart, the sixth-placed team of the championship, qualified for the 2010–11 UEFA Europa League third qualifying round instead.

== Participating clubs ==
The following 64 teams competed in the first round:

Bundesliga the 18 clubs of the 2008–09 season	2. Bundesliga; the 18 clubs of the 2008–09 season	3. Fußball-Liga; the top 4 clubs of the 2008–09 season
Arminia Bielefeld; VfL Bochum; SV Werder Bremen; FC Energie Cottbus; Borussia Dortmund; Eintracht Frankfurt; Hamburger SV; Hannover 96; Hertha BSC; TSG 1899 Hoffenheim; Karlsruher SC; 1. FC Köln; Bayer 04 Leverkusen; Borussia Mönchengladbach; FC Bayern Munich; FC Schalke 04; VfB Stuttgart; VfL Wolfsburg	Alemannia Aachen; Rot-Weiß Ahlen; FC Augsburg; MSV Duisburg; SC Freiburg; SpVgg Greuther Fürth; FSV Frankfurt; FC Ingolstadt 04; 1. FC Kaiserslautern; TuS Koblenz; 1. FSV Mainz 05; TSV 1860 Munich; 1. FC Nürnberg; Rot-Weiß Oberhausen; VfL Osnabrück; F.C. Hansa Rostock; FC St. Pauli; SV Wehen Wiesbaden	1. FC Union Berlin; Fortuna Düsseldorf; SC Paderborn 07; SpVgg Unterhaching
Winners of 21 regional cup competitions
Baden SpVgg Neckarelz; Bavaria (Note: Finalists from the three regions with the most participating teams in their league competitions are also allowed to compete.) SpVgg Weiden (CW) SV Wacker Burghausen; Berlin Tennis Borussia Berlin (Note: Tennis Borussia Berlin qualified as losing finalists from Berlin because winners 1. FC Union Berlin have already qualified via their league place.); Brandenburg SV Babelsberg 03; Bremen FC Oberneuland; Hamburg SC Concordia Hamburg; Hesse Kickers Offenbach	Lower Rhine VfB Speldorf; Lower Saxony Kickers Emden (CW) Eintracht Braunschweig; Mecklenburg-Vorpommern Torgelower SV Greif; Middle Rhine TSV Germania Windeck (Note: Germania Dattenfeld was renamed TSV Germania Windeck, effective 1 July 2009.); Rhineland SV Eintracht Trier 05; Saarland SV Elversberg; Saxony Dynamo Dresden (Note: While Dresden's reserve team won the cup final, rules stipulate the club must send its first team into the competition, unless it had qualified via a league place.)	Saxony-Anhalt; 1. FC Magdeburg; Schleswig-Holstein VfB Lübeck; South Baden FC 08 Villingen; Southwest Wormatia Worms; Thuringia FC Rot-Weiß Erfurt; Westphalia Preußen Münster (CW) Sportfreunde Lotte; Württemberg SG Sonnenhof Großaspach

== Draw ==
The draws for the different rounds are conducted as following: For the first round, the participating teams will be split into two pots. The first pot contains all teams which have qualified through their regional cup competitions, the best four teams of the 3rd Liga and the bottom four teams of the Second Bundesliga. Every team from this pot will be drawn to a team from the second pot, which contains all remaining professional teams. The teams from the first pot will be set as the home team in the process.

The two-pot scenario will also be applied for the second round, with the remaining 3rd Liga/amateur teams in the first pot and the remaining professional teams in the other pot. Once one pot is empty, the remaining pairings will be drawn from the other pot with the first-drawn team for a match serving as hosts. For the remaining rounds, the draw will be conducted from just one pot. Any remaining 3rd Liga/amateur team will be the home team if drawn against a professional team. In every other case, the first-drawn team will serve as hosts.

== Matches ==
Times up to 24 October 2009 and from 28 March 2010 are CEST (UTC+2). Times from 25 October 2009 to 27 March 2010 are CET (UTC+1).

=== First round ===
The draw took place on 27 June 2009, 18:00 UTC+2 at the Norisring, Nuremberg, and involved the 64 teams listed in the table above. Germany international Renate Lingor conducted the draw. The matches will be played from 31 July – 3 August 2009.

31 July 2009	SV Babelsberg 03	0–1	Bayer Leverkusen	Babelsberg
20:30 UTC+2		Report (in German)	Derdiyok 67'	Stadium: Karl-Liebknecht-Stadion; Attendance: 6,100; Referee: Robert Hartmann (Ingolstadt)

31 July 2009	Eintracht Braunschweig	0–1	1. FC Kaiserslautern	Braunschweig
20:30 UTC+2		Report (in German)	Nemec 62' Iličević (red card) 35'	Stadium: Eintracht-Stadion; Attendance: 20,000; Referee: Peter Gagelmann (Bremen)

31 July 2009	FC Ingolstadt	1–2	FC Augsburg	Ingolstadt
20:30 UTC+2	Braber 73'	Report (in German)	Ndjeng 13'; Thurk 28'	Stadium: Tuja-Stadion; Attendance: 6,000; Referee: Tobias Welz (Wiesbaden)

31 July 2009	VfB Lübeck	2–1 (a.e.t.)	Mainz 05	Lübeck
20:30 UTC+2	Schrum 56'; Sachs 95'	Report (in German)	Bungert 19'	Stadium: Lohmühle; Attendance: 7,898; Referee: Thorsten Schriever (Dorum)

31 July 2009	VfL Osnabrück	2–1	Hansa Rostock	Osnabrück
20:30 UTC+2	Reichenberger 57'; Schmidt 90'	Report (in German)	Schied 75'	Stadium: Osnatel-Arena; Attendance: 10,550; Referee: Norbert Grudzinski (Hamburg)

31 July 2009	SV Wehen Wiesbaden	1–4	VfL Wolfsburg	Wiesbaden
20:30 UTC+2	Bohl 62'	Report (in German)	Grafite 25'; Misimović 41', 56'; Džeko 51'	Stadium: BRITA-Arena; Attendance: 7,433; Referee: Deniz Aytekin (Oberasbach)

1 August 2009	Dynamo Dresden	0–3	1. FC Nürnberg	Dresden
15:30 UTC+2		Report (in German)	Kluge 12'; Mintál 25'; Gündoğan 53'	Stadium: Rudolf-Harbig-Stadion; Attendance: 15,460; Referee: Lutz Wagner (Kriftel)

1 August 2009	Kickers Emden	0–3	1. FC Köln	Emden
15:30 UTC+2	Menzel (yellow card) 37' (yellow-red card) 54'	Report (in German)	Mohamad 37'; Sanou 59'; Podolski 88'	Stadium: Embdena-Stadion; Attendance: 7,200; Referee: Christian Fischer (Hemer)

1 August 2009	SV Elversberg	0–2	SC Freiburg	Spiesen-Elversberg
15:30 UTC+2		Report (in German)	Butscher 30'; Reisinger 83'	Stadium: Waldstadion an der Kaiserlinde; Attendance: 3,500; Referee: Florian Steuer (Menden)

1 August 2009	FSV Frankfurt	1–2	Borussia Mönchengladbach	Frankfurt am Main
15:30 UTC+2	Ross 72' Šimac (red card) 47'	Report (in German)	Arango 27'; Colautti 59'	Stadium: Frankfurter Volksbank Stadion; Attendance: 9,742; Referee: Thorsten Kinhöfer (Herne)

1 August 2009	SC Paderborn	0–1	1860 München	Paderborn
15:30 UTC+2		Report (in German)	Felhi 24'	Stadium: Energieteam-Arena; Attendance: 8,116; Referee: Guido Winkmann (Kerken)

1 August 2009	SG Sonnenhof Großaspach	1–4	VfB Stuttgart	Heilbronn
15:30 UTC+2	Ismaili 37' Aupperle (yellow card) 43' (yellow-red card) 90'	Report (in German)	Hitzlsperger 55'; Cacau 62'; Šimák 66', 88'	Stadium: Frankenstadion; Attendance: 15,000; Referee: Michael Kempter (Sauldorf)

1 August 2009	SpVgg Unterhaching	0–3	Arminia Bielefeld	Unterhaching
15:30 UTC+2		Report (in German)	Halfar 32'; Katongo 45+1'; Federico 52'	Stadium: Generali Sportpark; Attendance: 2,250; Referee: Christian Dingert (Thallichtenberg)

1 August 2009	SpVgg Weiden	1–3	Borussia Dortmund	Weiden
15:30 UTC+2	Méndez 79' Schrepel (yellow card) 62' (yellow-red card) 86'	Report (in German)	Barrios 24'; Şahin 46'; Zidan 90+2'	Stadium: Stadion am Wasserwerk; Attendance: 10,000; Referee: Tobias Stieler (Obertshausen)

1 August 2009	Tennis Borussia Berlin	0–2	Karlsruher SC	Berlin
19:30 UTC+2		Report (in German)	Buck 35'; Neubert 82' (o.g.)	Stadium: Friedrich-Ludwig-Jahn-Sportpark; Attendance: 1,200; Referee: Sascha Thielert (Buchholz in der Nordheide)

1 August 2009	Wacker Burghausen	1–1 (a.e.t.) (4–5 p)	Rot Weiss Ahlen	Burghausen
19:30 UTC+2	El Haj Ali 115'	Report (in German)	Döring 105'	Stadium: Wacker Arena; Attendance: 3,500; Referee: Marco Fritz (Korb)
	Penalties
	Belleri (penalty scored); Traut (penalty scored); Burkhard (penalty missed); Kresin (penalty scored); Riemann (penalty scored)		(penalty scored) Mikolajczak; (penalty scored) Bröker; (penalty scored) Busch; (penalty scored) Omodiagbe; (penalty scored) Reichwein

1 August 2009	1. FC Magdeburg	1–3	Energie Cottbus	Magdeburg
19:30 UTC+2	Tüting 44'	Report (in German)	Jula 4'; Shao 37'; Radu 82'	Stadium: MDCC-Arena; Attendance: 14,852; Referee: Bibiana Steinhaus (Hanover)

1 August 2009	Preußen Münster	1–3 (a.e.t.)	Hertha BSC	Münster
19:30 UTC+2	Lorenz 53'	Report (in German)	Raffael 23', 120'; Domovchiyski 118'	Stadium: Preußenstadion; Attendance: 18,000; Referee: Frank Willenborg (Osnabrück)

1 August 2009	Germania Windeck	0–4	Schalke 04	Cologne
19:30 UTC+2		Report (in German)	Zambrano 10'; Kurányi 43'; Kenia 68'; Höwedes 85'	Stadium: RheinEnergieStadion; Attendance: 20,000; Referee: Jochen Drees (Münster-Sarmsheim)

2 August 2009	1. FC Union Berlin	0–5	Werder Bremen	Berlin
14:30 UTC+2		Report (in German)	Sanogo 11', 27'; Naldo 20'; Moreno 85', 88'	Stadium: Alte Försterei; Attendance: 18,955; Referee: Felix Brych (Munich)

2 August 2009	Concordia Hamburg	0–4	TuS Koblenz	Hamburg
14:30 UTC+2		Report (in German)	S. Kuqi 13', 68'; Geißler 15'; Lense 27'	Stadium: Stadion Hoheluft; Attendance: 2,000; Referee: Daniel Siebert (Berlin)

2 August 2009	FC Oberneuland	0–2	1899 Hoffenheim	Bremen
14:30 UTC+2		Report (in German)	Obasi 47'; Maicosuel 53'	Stadium: Sportpark Vinnenweg; Attendance: 3,500; Referee: Tobias Christ (Kaiserslautern)

2 August 2009	VfB Speldorf	0–3	Rot-Weiß Oberhausen	Duisburg
14:30 UTC+2		Report (in German)	König 5'; Terranova 51'; Embers 67'	Stadium: MSV-Arena; Attendance: 4,500; Referee: Thomas Metzen (Mechernich)

2 August 2009	FC 08 Villingen	0–2 (a.e.t.)	FC St. Pauli	Villingen-Schwenningen
14:30 UTC+2		Report (in German)	Naki 105', 120+1'	Stadium: Friedengrund; Attendance: 8,200; Referee: Christian Leicher (Weihmichl)

2 August 2009	Rot-Weiß Erfurt	1–2	MSV Duisburg	Erfurt
16:00 UTC+2	Semmer 61'	Report (in German)	Tararache 27' (pen.), 70'	Stadium: Steigerwaldstadion; Attendance: 7,074; Referee: Günter Perl (Pullach)

2 August 2009	Torgelower SV Greif	1–4	Alemannia Aachen	Torgelow
16:00 UTC+2	Pankau 36'	Report (in German)	Szukała 5'; Auer 43'; Németh 56' (pen.); Oussalé 73'	Stadium: Gießerei-Arena; Attendance: 5,000; Referee: Felix Zwayer (Berlin)

2 August 2009	Wormatia Worms	0–1 (a.e.t.)	SpVgg Greuther Fürth	Worms
16:00 UTC+2		Report (in German)	Allagui 119'	Stadium: Wormatia-Stadion; Attendance: 4,828; Referee: Robert Kempter (Sauldorf)

2 August 2009	Sportfreunde Lotte	0–1	VfL Bochum	Lotte
17:30 UTC+2		Report (in German)	Klimowicz 50'	Stadium: PGW Arena; Attendance: 6,000; Referee: Christian Bandurski (Essen)

2 August 2009	SpVgg Neckarelz	1–3	Bayern Munich	Sinsheim
17:30 UTC+2	Throm 80' Fickert (yellow card) 57' (yellow-red card) 74'	Report (in German)	Gómez 51', 57' (pen.); Altıntop 82'	Stadium: Rhein-Neckar-Arena; Attendance: 30,000; Referee: Markus Wingenbach (Diez)

2 August 2009	Kickers Offenbach	0–3	Eintracht Frankfurt	Offenbach am Main
17:30 UTC+2		Report (in German)	Schwegler 71'; Caio 75'; Meier 86'	Stadium: Bieberer Berg; Attendance: 24,000; Referee: Wolfgang Stark (Ergolding)

2 August 2009	Eintracht Trier	3–1	Hannover 96	Trier
17:30 UTC+2	Wagner 60'; Cinar 65'; Senesie 90+1'	Report (in German)	Rosenthal 40'	Stadium: Moselstadion; Attendance: 6,000; Referee: Markus Schmidt (Stuttgart)

3 August 2009	Fortuna Düsseldorf	3–3 (a.e.t.) (1–4 p)	Hamburger SV	Düsseldorf
20:30 UTC+2	Fink 11'; Boateng 16' (o.g.); Lambertz 120'	Report (in German)	Petrić 4'; Trochowski 54', 95' (pen.)	Stadium: ESPRIT Arena; Attendance: 40,000; Referee: Babak Rafati (Hanover)
	Penalties
	Christ (penalty scored); Heidinger (penalty missed); Caillas (penalty missed)		(penalty scored) Zé Roberto; (penalty scored) Trochowski; (penalty scored) Mathijsen; (penalty scored) Jansen

=== Second round ===
The draw took place on 8 August 2009 at Rhein-Neckar-Arena, Sinsheim and involved the 32 winners of the first round. Germany international Inka Grings conducted the draw. The matches were played on 22–23 September 2009.

22 September 2009	Eintracht Trier	4–2 (a.e.t.)	Arminia Bielefeld	Trier
19:00 UTC+2	Senesie 61', 75' (pen.), 120+1'; Risser 110'	Report (in German)	Janjić 46', 49'	Stadium: Moselstadion; Attendance: 6,630; Referee: Christian Bandurski (Essen)

22 September 2009	1. FC Nürnberg	0–1	1899 Hoffenheim	Nuremberg
19:00 UTC+2		Report (in German)	Nilsson 35'	Stadium: easyCredit-Stadion; Attendance: 26,041; Referee: Manuel Gräfe (Berlin)

22 September 2009	Bayern Munich	5–0	Rot-Weiß Oberhausen	Munich
19:00 UTC+2	Lahm 32'; Gómez 41'; Van Buyten 67', 86'; Müller 70'	Report (in German)		Stadium: Allianz Arena; Attendance: 42,000; Referee: Felix Zwayer (Berlin)

22 September 2009	Borussia Mönchengladbach	0–1	MSV Duisburg	Mönchengladbach
19:00 UTC+2		Report (in German)	Andersen 90+1'	Stadium: Borussia-Park; Attendance: 45,000; Referee: Marco Fritz (Korb)

22 September 2009	Rot-Weiß Ahlen	2–3 (a.e.t.)	SpVgg Greuther Fürth	Ahlen
20:30 UTC+2	Tankulić 87' 93'	Report (in German)	Nöthe 61'; Mokhtari 98'; Müller 120+1'	Stadium: Wersestadion; Attendance: 1,896; Referee: Christian Dingert (Thallichtenberg)

22 September 2009	Karlsruher SC	0–3	Borussia Dortmund	Karlsruhe
20:30 UTC+2		Report (in German)	Zidan 2'; Barrios 22', 51'	Stadium: Wildparkstadion; Attendance: 24,864; Referee: Robert Hartmann (Ingolstadt)

22 September 2009	VfL Bochum	0–3	Schalke 04	Bochum
20:30 UTC+2		Report (in German)	Westermann 10'; Altıntop 56'; Fuchs 76' (o.g.)	Stadium: rewirpowerSTADION; Attendance: 29,592; Referee: Florian Meyer (Burgdorf)

22 September 2009	TuS Koblenz	4–2 (a.e.t.)	Energie Cottbus	Koblenz
20:30 UTC+2	Stieber 14'; Everson 52', 105'; Geißler 120+1'	Report (in German)	Jula 9'; Sørensen 79'	Stadium: Stadion Oberwerth; Attendance: 5,046; Referee: Christian Fischer (Hemer)

23 September 2009	1860 München	2–2 (a.e.t.) (4–1 p)	Hertha BSC	Munich
19:00 UTC+2	Bengtsson 10' (o.g.); Cooper 50'	Report (in German)	Ramos 76'; Domovchiyski 79'	Stadium: Allianz Arena; Attendance: 17,000; Referee: Knut Kircher (Rottenburg)
	Penalties
	Hoffmann (penalty scored); Ludwig (penalty scored); Mlapa (penalty scored); Fehli (penalty scored)		(penalty missed) Kačar; (penalty missed) Janker; (penalty scored) Domovchiyski

23 September 2009	FC Augsburg	1–0	SC Freiburg	Augsburg
19:00 UTC+2	Brinkmann 64'	Report (in German)		Stadium: Impuls Arena; Referee: Markus Schmidt (Stuttgart)

23 September 2009	Werder Bremen	2–1	FC St. Pauli	Bremen
19:00 UTC+2	Hunt 28'; Naldo 81'	Report (in German)	Takyi 74'	Stadium: Weserstadion; Referee: Guido Winkmann (Kerken)

23 September 2009	Eintracht Frankfurt	6–4	Alemannia Aachen	Frankfurt am Main
19:00 UTC+2	Caio 1'; Liberopoulos 5', 50'; Szukała 45' (o.g.); Meier 53'; Teber 89' (pen.)	Report (in German)	Gueye 23', 87'; Auer 66', 72'	Stadium: Commerzbank-Arena; Attendance: 27,450; Referee: Jochen Drees (Münster-Sarmsheim)

23 September 2009	VfL Osnabrück	3–3 (a.e.t.) (4–2 p)	Hamburger SV	Osnabrück
20:30 UTC+2	Hansen 52'; Siegert 67'; Grieneisen 116'	Report (in German)	Petrić 77'; Trochowski 90+2' (pen.); Demel 100'	Stadium: Osnatel-Arena; Attendance: 16,100; Referee: Markus Wingenbach (Diez)
	Penalties
	Schmidt (penalty scored); Lindemann (penalty scored); Nickenig (penalty scored); Heidrich (penalty scored)		(penalty missed) Tesche; (penalty scored) Trochowski; (penalty scored) Elia; (penalty missed) Petrić

23 September 2009	VfB Lübeck	1–3 (a.e.t.)	VfB Stuttgart	Lübeck
20:30 UTC+2	Henning 6'	Report (in German)	Schieber 77'; Khedira 109'; Cacau 118'	Stadium: Lohmühle; Attendance: 16.900; Referee: Peter Gagelmann (Bremen)

23 September 2009	1. FC Kaiserslautern	2–1	Bayer Leverkusen	Kaiserslautern
20:30 UTC+2	Sam 12'; Jendrišek 62'	Report (in German)	Gekas 86'	Stadium: Fritz-Walter-Stadion; Attendance: 33,712; Referee: Lutz Wagner (Kriftel)

23 September 2009	1. FC Köln	3–2	VfL Wolfsburg	Cologne
20:30 UTC+2	Ishiaku 22', 32'; Freis 65'	Report (in German)	Džeko 54'; Riether 66'	Stadium: RheinEnergieStadion; Attendance: 31,500; Referee: Wolfgang Stark (Ergolding)

=== Round of 16 ===
27 October 2009	SpVgg Greuther Fürth	1–0	VfB Stuttgart	Fürth
19:00 UTC+1	Nehrig 32'	Report (in German)		Stadium: Playmobil-Stadion; Attendance: 10,800; Referee: Babak Rafati (Hanover)

27 October 2009	Eintracht Trier	0–3	1. FC Köln	Trier
19:00 UTC+1		Report (in German)	Novaković 25'; Mohamad 29'; Maniche 52'	Stadium: Moselstadion; Attendance: 10,800; Referee: Marco Fritz (Korb)

27 October 2009	VfL Osnabrück	3–2	Borussia Dortmund	Osnabrück
20:30 UTC+1	Barletta 37', 42'; Siegert 69'	Report (in German)	Şahin 55'; Barrios 90+6'	Stadium: Osnatel-Arena; Attendance: 16,250; Referee: Guido Winkmann (Kerken)

27 October 2009	FC Augsburg	5–0	MSV Duisburg	Augsburg
20:30 UTC+1	Larsen 45+1'; Thurk 46'; Möhrle 55'; Torghelle 74'; Ndjeng 76'	Report (in German)	(red card) 51' Caiuby	Stadium: Impuls Arena; Attendance: 12,203; Referee: Knut Kircher (Rottenburg)

28 October 2009	1860 München	0–3	Schalke 04	Munich
19:00 UTC+1		Report (in German)	Rafinha 41'; Höwedes 48', 81'	Stadium: Allianz Arena; Attendance: 28,500; Referee: Markus Schmidt (Stuttgart)

28 October 2009	Werder Bremen	3–0	1. FC Kaiserslautern	Bremen
19:00 UTC+1	Pasanen 28'; Borowski 39'; Oehrl 76'	Report (in German)		Stadium: Weserstadion; Attendance: 26,094; Referee: Deniz Aytekin (Oberasbach)

28 October 2009	1899 Hoffenheim	4–0	TuS Koblenz	Sinsheim
20:30 UTC+1	Salihović 50'; Ibisević 67'; Maicosuel 71'; Compper 90'	Report (in German)		Stadium: Rhein-Neckar-Arena; Attendance: 18,050; Referee: Günter Perl (Pullach)

28 October 2009	Eintracht Frankfurt	0–4	Bayern Munich	Frankfurt am Main
20:30 UTC+1		Report (in German)	Klose 14', 19'; Müller 29'; Toni 52'	Stadium: Commerzbank-Arena; Attendance: 51,500; Referee: Thorsten Kinhöfer (Herne)

=== Quarter-finals ===
The draw took place on 1 November 2009 as part of the ARD-Sportschau, and involved the 8 winners of the round of 16. Germany international Linda Bresonik conducted the draw. The matches will be played on 9–10 February 2010.

9 February 2010	Werder Bremen	2–1	1899 Hoffenheim	Bremen
20:30 UTC+1	Naldo 27'; Almeida 76'	Report (in German)	Tagoe 73'	Stadium: Weserstadion; Attendance: 25,000; Referee: Peter Sippel (Munich)

10 February 2010	Bayern Munich	6–2	SpVgg Greuther Fürth	Munich
19:00 UTC+1	Müller 5', 82'; Robben 58' (pen.); Ribéry 61'; Lahm 65'; Allagui 89' (o.g.)	Report (in German)	Nöthe 10'; Allagui 40'	Stadium: Allianz Arena; Attendance: 53,500; Referee: Michael Weiner (Giesen)

10 February 2010	VfL Osnabrück	0–1	Schalke 04	Osnabrück
20:30 UTC+1		Report (in German)	Kurányi 59'	Stadium: Osnatel-Arena; Attendance: 16,130; Referee: Manuel Gräfe (Berlin)

10 February 2010	FC Augsburg	2–0	1. FC Köln	Augsburg
19:00 UTC+1	Thurk 3'; Rafael 86'	Report (in German)		Stadium: Impuls Arena; Attendance: 30,660; Referee: Thorsten Kinhöfer (Herne)

=== Semi-finals ===
The draw was conducted on 10 February.

23 March 2010
20:30 GMT+1

Werder Bremen	2–0	FC Augsburg
Marin 30'; Pizarro 84'	Report (in German)

Weserstadion, Bremen
Attendance: 32,000
Referee: Manuel Gräfe (Berlin)

24 March 2010
20:30 GMT+1

Schalke 04	0–1 (a.e.t.)	Bayern Munich
	Report (in German)	Robben 112'

Arena AufSchalke, Gelsenkirchen
Attendance: 61,673
Referee: Knut Kircher (Rottenburg)

=== Final ===
15 May 2010
20:00 CEST

Werder Bremen	0–4	Bayern Munich
	Report	Robben 35' (pen.); Olić 51'; Ribéry 63'; Schweinsteiger 83'

Olympiastadion, Berlin
Attendance: 75,420
Referee: Thorsten Kinhöfer (Herne)
