= Arjen Robben =

Dutch association footballer (born 1984)

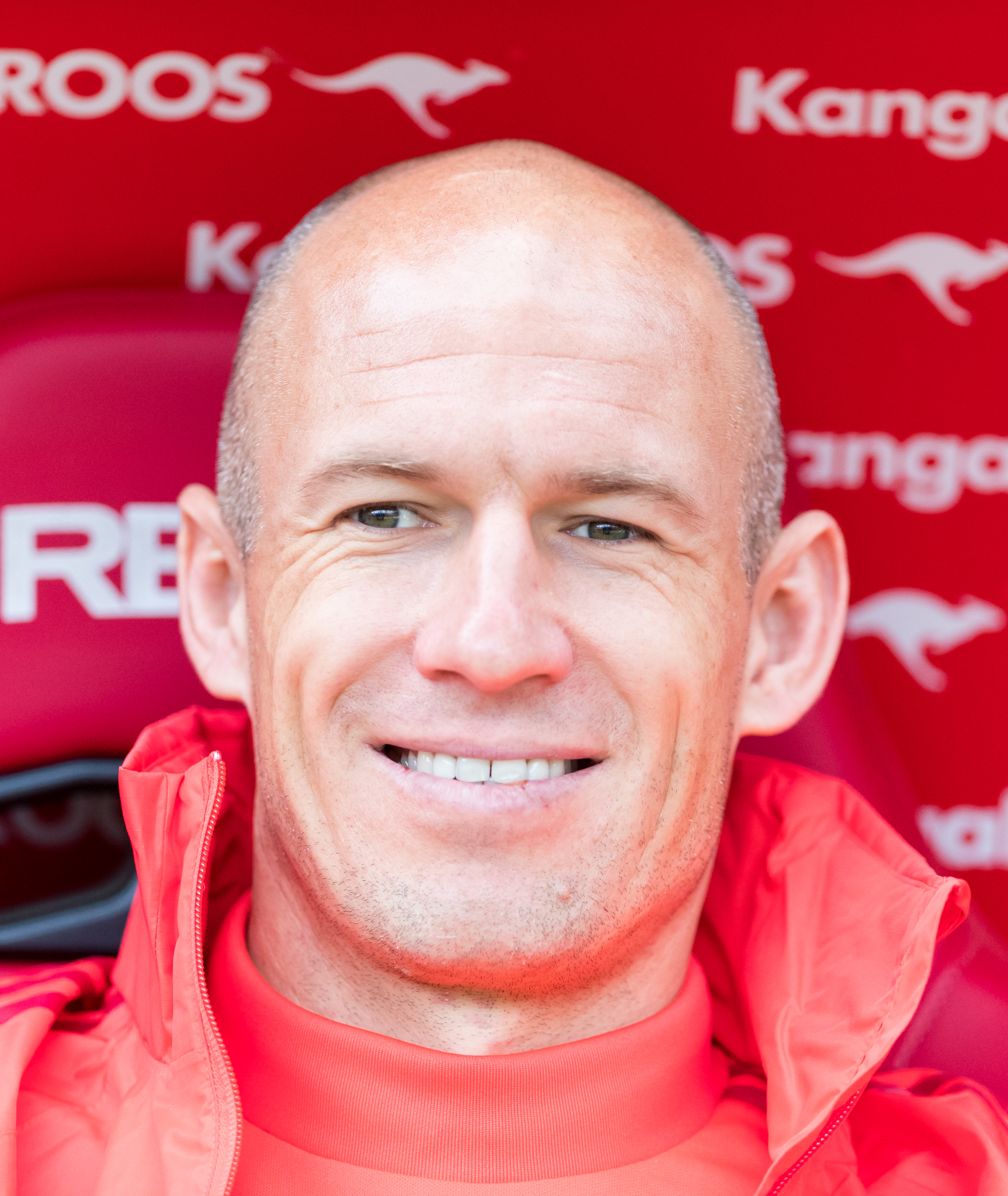
- Robben with Bayern Munich in 2019

Personal information
- Full name: Arjen Robben
- Date of birth: 23 January 1984 (age 42)
- Place of birth: Bedum, Netherlands
- Height: 1.80 m (5 ft 11 in)
- Position: Right winger

Youth career
- 1989–1996: VV Bedum
- 1996–2000: Groningen

Senior career*
| Years | Team | Apps | (Gls) |
| 2000–2002 | Groningen | 46 | (8) |
| 2002–2004 | PSV | 56 | (17) |
| 2004–2007 | Chelsea | 67 | (15) |
| 2007–2009 | Real Madrid | 50 | (11) |
| 2009–2019 | Bayern Munich | 201 | (99) |
| 2020–2021 | Groningen | 6 | (0) |
| Total | | 426 | (150) |

International career
| 1999 | Netherlands U15 | 1 | (0) |
| 1999–2000 | Netherlands U16 | 11 | (4) |
| 2000 | Netherlands U17 | 3 | (1) |
| 2001–2002 | Netherlands U19 | 8 | (2) |
| 2001–2003 | Netherlands U21 | 8 | (1) |
| 2003–2017 | Netherlands | 96 | (37) |
Medal record
Representing Netherlands
Men's football
FIFA World Cup
| Runner-up | 2010 South Africa |
| Third place | 2014 Brazil |
UEFA European Championship
| Bronze medal – third place | 2004 Portugal |
- * Club domestic league appearances and goals

Arjen Robben (Dutch pronunciation: [ˈɑrjə(n) ˈrɔbə(n)]; born 23 January 1984) is a Dutch former professional footballer who played as a winger. Known for his dribbling skills, speed, and long-range shots, he is regarded as one of the best players of his generation and one of the greatest wingers of all time. He ranks second for the all-time Dutch top goalscorers (32) in the UEFA Champions League and is the all-time Dutch top assist provider (19) in the competition.

Robben first came to prominence with Groningen, for whom he was player of the year for the 2000–01 Eredivisie season. Two years later he signed for PSV, where he became the Netherlands' Young Player of the Year and won an Eredivisie title. In 2004, Chelsea signed Robben, where he won two consecutive Premier League titles and was named in the PFA Team of the Year for 2004–05. He joined Real Madrid in a transfer worth €35 million in 2007 and won the La Liga title in his first season.

In August 2009, Robben transferred to Bayern Munich for a fee of around €25 million. In his debut season, he helped Bayern reach the Champions League final, finished as the club's top scorer in the 2009–10 Bundesliga title win (his first of eight Bundesliga titles), and opened the scoring in the DFB-Pokal final as Bayern completed the domestic double. He was named the 2010 German Footballer of the Year. After losing another Champions League final in 2012, Robben was decisive in Bayern's historic continental treble in 2012–13, earning Man of the Match in the 2013 Champions League final after assisting the opener and scoring the winning goal in a 2–1 victory over rivals Borussia Dortmund. In 2014, Robben was named in the FIFPro World XI and the UEFA Team of the Year, and came in fourth place in the Ballon d'Or. After winning seven consecutive league titles, he left Bayern at the end of the 2018–19 season and retired. He played 309 competitive matches for the club and scored 144 goals. A season later, he briefly came out of retirement and had a short stint with Groningen.

Robben debuted for the Netherlands in 2003. He started in the 2010 FIFA World Cup final, which the Netherlands lost to Spain. He also appeared at the 2004, 2008 and 2012 UEFA European Championships, and the 2006 and 2014 FIFA World Cups. In the latter, he won the Bronze Ball and was named in the tournament's All-Star Team. He retired from international football in 2017, making 96 appearances and scoring 37 goals.

== Early life ==
Robben was born in Bedum, in the northeastern Netherlands. He took to football from an early age, becoming an adherent of the Coerver Method. Robben's skill in ball control and technical footwork made him a valuable player, and he was quickly signed by regional club FC Groningen. Here, he developed his distinctive style of cutting inside from the right onto his left foot to score some quite spectacular goals.

== Club career ==
=== Groningen ===
Groningen placed Robben in their first team for the 1999–2000 season. He scored three goals in league play. Manager Jan van Dijk added the winger to the first team before Groningen's November 2000 away game against Twente, but he did not play until 3 December 2000 against RKC Waalwijk as a substitute for the injured Leonardo dos Santos in the 79th minute. During the winter, Robben managed to play himself into the starting lineup. In 18 starts for Groningen over the 2000–01 season, he scored two goals. Robben was named player of the year for his first season with the club, and with teammate Jordi Hoogstrate, he demonstrated the strength of the Groningen youth academy. Robben stayed with Groningen and improved steadily during the 2001–02 season, playing in 28 matches and scoring six goals. Robben transferred to PSV for €3.9 million before the 2002–03 season.

=== PSV ===
During his first season for PSV, the 2002–03 season, Robben played 33 matches and scored 12 goals. He was named "PSV co-player of the year" along with striker Mateja Kežman, with whom he formed an attacking partnership still fondly referred to by PSV fans as "Batman and Robben". He helped lead PSV to their 17th Dutch title, and won the Talented Player of the Year award. After this good start, PSV could not keep up with rival Ajax and were forced into a fight for second place in the Eredivisie. Robben travelled to London and met with Manchester United manager Sir Alex Ferguson. Manchester United's offer came in much too low for PSV's and Robben's liking; PSV chairman Harry van Raaij told United that the most their €7 million offer would buy them was a shirt with Robben's autograph. Almost immediately, Chelsea owner Roman Abramovich offered €18 million (~ £12.1 million), and PSV accepted. The rest of his season with PSV was disappointing: he injured his hamstring twice and missed several games. By the end of the season, Robben scored five times in 23 Eredivisie matches.

=== Chelsea ===
==== 2004–06: Back-to-back Premier League titles ====
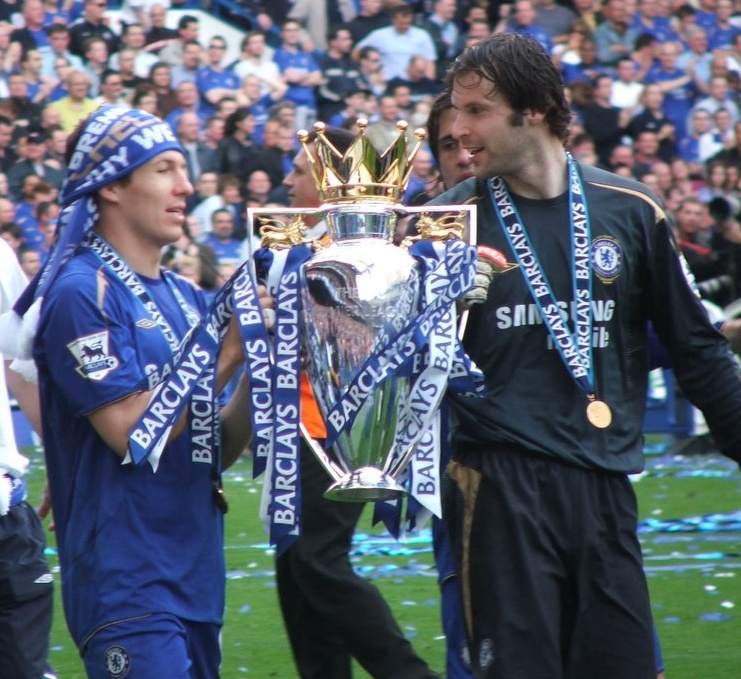
Robben and Petr Čech celebrating the 2005–06 Premier League win in April 2006

Robben did not make his competitive debut for Chelsea until 23 October 2004 against Blackburn Rovers, as he was injured in a pre-season friendly match against Roma, breaking a metatarsal bone in his right foot in a challenge from Olivier Dacourt. During this time, he told club doctors that he had noticed an unfamiliar growth on one of his testicles. The medical team quickly did tests to check for testicular cancer, but he was subsequently given the all clear.

Robben proved to be a crucial player for the 2004–05 season; in November 2004, he was awarded the Premier League Player of the Month award. Robben ended the 2004–05 season with seven goals, his second highest professional total. He was shortlisted for the PFA Young Player of the Year, but was beaten by Manchester United's Wayne Rooney. Robben was badly injured in a Premier League match away to Blackburn Rovers and forced to sit out the 2005 Football League Cup Final, Chelsea's title run-in and progress to the semi-finals of the UEFA Champions League. Back to fitness for 2005–06, Robben was an integral part of the Chelsea left wing. In 28 matches, Robben contributed six goals as Chelsea won a second consecutive Premier League championship, the first back-to-back titles for the west London club.

==== 2006–07: Final season ====
Robben was later named man of the match on 23 December 2006 against Wigan Athletic, a match where he got two assists and the winning goal.

Robben was inflicted with yet another injury in a match against Liverpool on 20 January 2007. Robben made his return in a 3–0 victory against Middlesbrough in February, driving in a shot that took a deflection past Mark Schwarzer for an own goal by Abel Xavier. He came on as a substitute for Claude Makélélé in the 2007 League Cup final against Arsenal and set up the winning goal for Didier Drogba. Robben scored a goal in the second round of the Champions League against Porto, which led to Chelsea winning the tie 3–2 on aggregate. At the end of March 2007, Robben underwent a knee operation after sustaining a knee injury upon returning from international duty that was expected to rule him out for at least four weeks. He only made two further appearances for Chelsea, both of which were as a substitute and both of which would prove to be key games for the club. His first appearance since returning from injury was against Liverpool in the Champions League semi-final second leg which went to penalties. Robben went on to have his penalty saved by Pepe Reina, and Chelsea ultimately lost.

Robben's final appearance for the club came against Manchester United in the 2007 FA Cup Final. Robben replaced Joe Cole at half-time, but was then substituted himself for Ashley Cole in extra time as Chelsea emerged victorious. Spanish club Real Madrid were interested in two of Chelsea's players. Then manager Bernd Schuster is said to have demanded Michael Ballack, while Real Madrid's then president Ramón Calderón was known to favour Robben. Robben said to reporters of Spanish newspaper AS, "I do not know when a deal will be reached. I would like to send a message to the Madrid fans, but I can't until my future is sorted."

Real Madrid eventually secured Robben's services in August 2007. He told Chelsea's official club website:

It was difficult to leave because I had a great time in my three years at Chelsea and I made a lot of friends. There was no time to say goodbye because the deal was closed on the Wednesday at 10 o'clock in the evening and the following morning I had to fly. If I have one day off I would want to come back and say goodbye because to the fans I owe a big thank you because they were always good to me. In my three years I won all the prizes there are to win in England.

=== Real Madrid ===
==== 2007–09: Debut season, La Liga triumph and forced departure ====
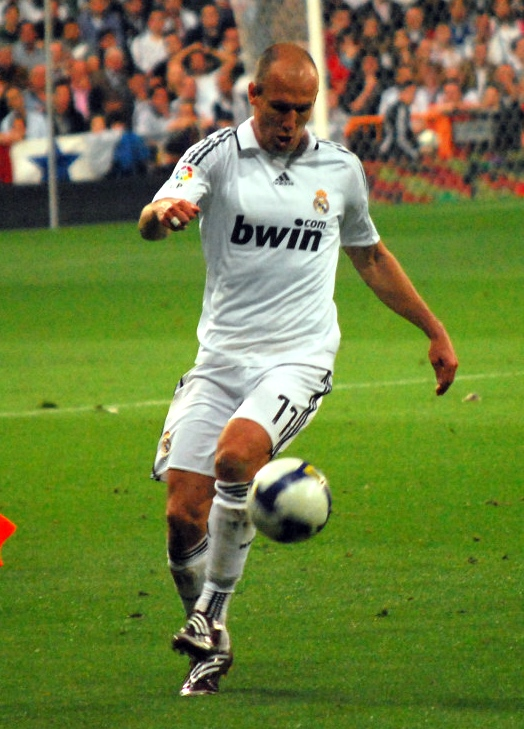
Robben playing for Real Madrid in La Liga in May 2009

Robben completed his move to Real Madrid on a five-year deal on 22 August 2007, with the transfer fee reported as £24 million (€35 million). He made his debut on 18 September as a substitute for Raúl during a Champions League match against Werder Bremen, which Real Madrid won 2–1. His La Liga debut came on 23 September, as a substitute for Royston Drenthe in a 1–1 away draw against Real Valladolid. On 10 February 2008, Robben scored his first goal, coming at home in a 7–0 victory against Valladolid.

Robben proved crucial for many Real Madrid matches, making his famous runs down the left wing and quickly became a first choice for the left midfield position, making 28 appearances during his debut season and scoring five goals. Real Madrid won the Liga title with multiple games to spare, and were already the champions of Spain when they played their arch-rivals Barcelona on 7 May 2008. The Barcelona players formed a guard of honour as the Madrid team came onto the pitch at the Santiago Bernabéu Stadium, and Robben played an important part in Real Madrid's subsequent 4–1 victory, scoring the champions' second goal.

Robben retained his key role in the Real Madrid midfield during the 2008–09 season, playing 35 times and scoring 8 goals. Although the Dutchman was one of the Spanish side's most important players in the pre-season games leading up to the 2009–10 season, having scored three goals and help set up another four, he was among the players whose place in the first team became threatened following the arrival of Florentino Pérez and the signings of Cristiano Ronaldo and Kaká. Real Madrid accepted a bid of around €25 million for Robben from Bayern Munich. Robben claimed he was "forced" to leave Real Madrid, saying that he "didn't want to go, but the club wanted to sell him".

=== Bayern Munich ===
==== 2009–12: German Footballer of the Year, domestic double and two-time UEFA Champions League runner-up ====
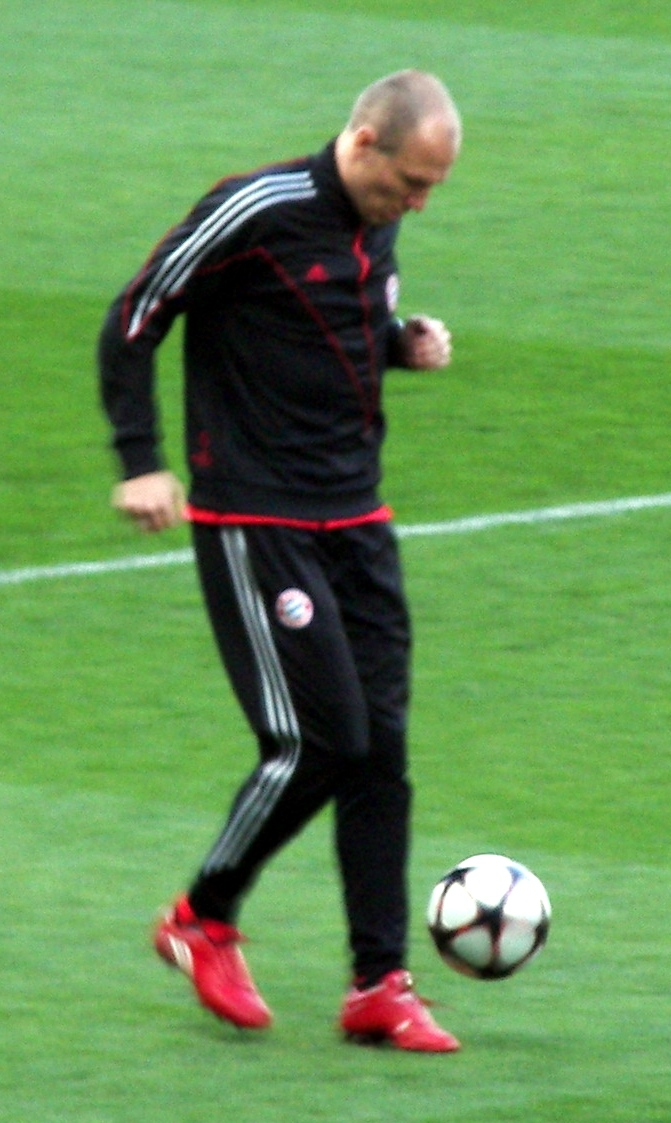
Robben prior to the UEFA Champions League match against Manchester United in April 2010

On 28 August 2009, Robben moved to Bayern Munich for around €25 million. He was given the number 10 jersey, last worn by his fellow Dutchman, Roy Makaay. On 9 March 2010, Robben scored the deciding goal in Bayern's 2–3 defeat (4–4 on aggregate over two legs) against Fiorentina, taking them through to the quarter-finals of the 2009–10 Champions League on away goals.

On 7 April 2010, Robben sent Bayern into the semi-finals of the Champions League with a stunning volley against Manchester United from the edge of the area into the corner of the net. The game ended 3–2 to United (4–4 on aggregate), with Bayern advancing again due to away goals.

On 17 April 2010, he scored his first hat-trick in the Bundesliga against Hannover 96 in the Allianz Arena. The game ended 7–0 to the Bavarians. On 8 May 2010, he won his first Bundesliga title with Bayern after scoring two goals in their 3–1 victory over Hertha BSC, finishing as Bayern's top scorer in the process.

A week later, Bayern played in the DFB-Pokal final against the previous champions of the tournament, Werder Bremen, in Berlin's Olympiastadion. Bayern won the game 4–0, with Robben scoring the first of his team's goals from a penalty kick. Robben thus helped the Bavarians achieve their 15th DFB-Pokal title. On 25 May 2010, Robben was named Footballer of the Year in Germany for 2010. He was the fourth foreigner and the first Dutchman to win the title. He finished the 2009–10 season with 23 goals in 37 appearances.

The 2010–11 season started poorly for Robben, after medical tests confirmed that his hamstring had not properly healed and would be out for two months. Bayern chairman Karl-Heinz Rummenigge stated that "Of course, Bayern Munich are very angry" with the Royal Dutch Football Association (KNVB), and would be seeking compensation from them, continuing, "Once again we must pay the bill as a club after a player is seriously injured playing for a national team." On 15 January 2011, he returned to first-team action, coming on as a substitute in the 1–1 away draw with VfL Wolfsburg.

Robben was nominated for the UEFA Champions League Best Midfielder award, but the award went to his international compatriot Wesley Sneijder. He has also been nominated for the prestigious Ballon d'Or award and the FIFA Puskás Award, which goes to the best goal of the year, and he has also been nominated for FIFA's FIFPro World XI 2010 squad thanks to his season with Bayern Munich. He finished the 2010–11 season with 13 goals in 17 appearances.

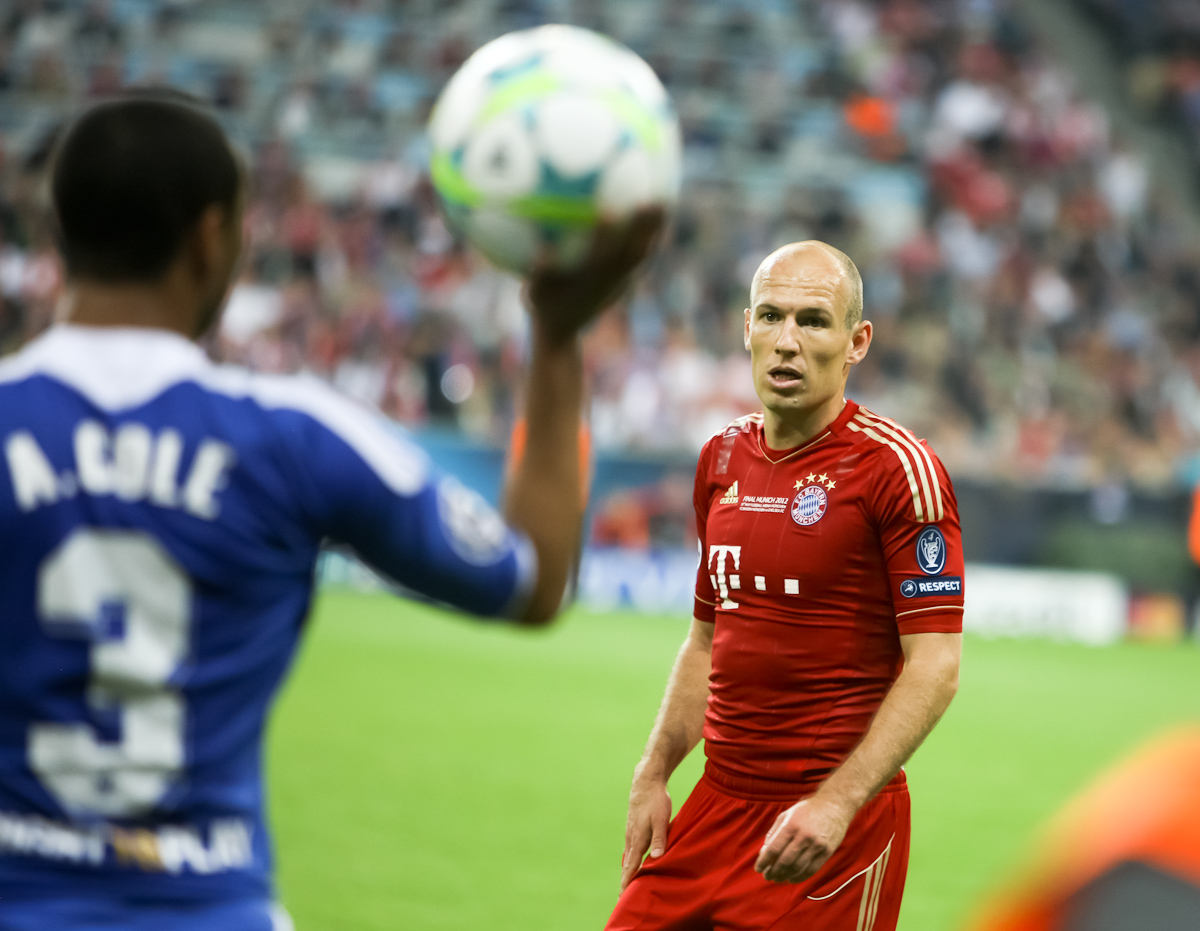
Robben during the 2012 Champions League final against his former club Chelsea

In the second leg of the semi-finals of the 2011–12 Champions League, against his former club Real Madrid, which was then managed by José Mourinho (who had been his manager at Chelsea), after Bayern fell behind 2–0, Robben converted a penalty to level the tie at 3–3. Bayern advanced to the final after winning the resulting penalty shootout.

On 3 May 2012, it was reported that Robben had signed a new contract with Bayern which would last until 2015.

Robben had an extra-time penalty saved by former teammate Petr Čech in the 2012 Champions League final at the Allianz Arena against Chelsea. Had he scored, Bayern Munich would have led Chelsea 2–1. The match, however, ended in a penalty shootout which Chelsea won. That was the fourth major cup final that he had been on the losing side during the last two years (FIFA World Cup final, two Champions League finals and the DFB-Pokal). Three days later in the same stadium, and while playing as a second-half substitute for the Netherlands in a friendly against Bayern Munich, he was jeered by some disgruntled Bayern fans every time he touched the ball (due to his unsuccessful penalty in the Champions League final, and as he did not play on Bayern's side during that match due to a decision taken by Netherlands coach Bert van Marwijk). The match had been organised to compensate Bayern, since Robben aggravated an injury playing for the Netherlands at the 2010 World Cup, and went on to miss several months of the 2010–11 season. He finished the 2011–12 season with 19 goals in 36 appearances.

==== 2012–14: UEFA Champions League triumph and continental treble ====
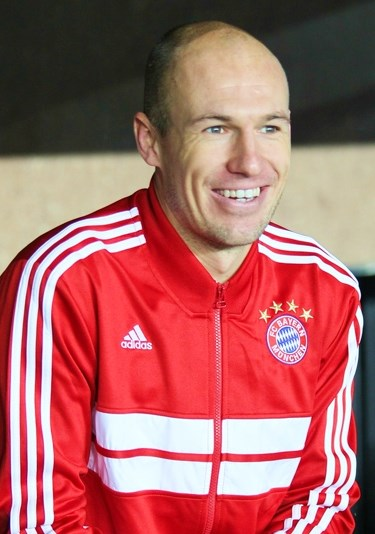
Robben in November 2013

In the 2012–13 season, Robben played in the German Super Cup. He had started the season on the bench, as manager Jupp Heynckes preferred to start Thomas Müller on the right wing, with Toni Kroos at the attacking midfielder position. Robben had played through the season as a substitute but earned his chance to start again after Kroos was injured during the Champions League tie against Juventus. He started on the right wing for the rest of the season, having moved Müller back to the middle. Robben started against Borussia Dortmund in the quarter-finals of the DFB-Pokal and scored the game's lone goal in the 43rd minute. In the Champions League semi-final against Barcelona, Robben started both games and scored in both, including the go-ahead goal in the second leg. Bayern would then go on to return to the final in Wembley Stadium. Robben atoned for his penalty missed the previous season by setting up teammate Mario Mandžukić's goal to open the scoring in the 60th minute then netting an 89th-minute winner in a 2–1 victory over Borussia Dortmund to give Bayern their fifth Champions League/European Cup title. During the presentation, he was named Man of the Match by UEFA. Hence, he has been called "Mr Wembley" since then. He finished the 2012–13 season with 13 goals in 31 appearances.

Robben scored his first goals of the 2013–14 season in the 2013 DFL-Supercup, a 4–2 defeat to Borussia Dortmund. On 9 August 2013, his opening goal helped Bayern to a 3–1 win over Borussia Mönchengladbach in their first match of the 2013–14 Bundesliga campaign. On 17 September, he scored in Bayern's Champions League opener against CSKA Moscow at the Allianz Arena. He went on to score two further goals during the Champions League group stage; in away wins against Manchester City and CSKA as Bayern finished as group winners. On 23 November, Robben was one of three scorers as Bayern beat title rivals Borussia Dortmund 3–0 at the Westfalenstadion. On 4 December, Robben was substituted with a deep cut on his right knee in a 2–0 DFB-Pokal win away to FC Augsburg which prevented him from taking part in the 2013 FIFA Club World Cup.

On 1 March 2014, Robben scored a hat-trick in Bayern's 5–1 win over Schalke 04. On 19 March, he signed a contract extension with Bayern which will keep him at the club until 2017. On 9 April, Robben scored Bayern's third goal in a 3–1 Champions League quarter-final against Manchester United, to secure qualification to the semi-finals. On 17 May, Robben scored Bayern's opening goal in a 2–0 extra-time defeat of Borussia Dortmund in the 2014 DFB-Pokal Final, giving him his third league and cup double in five seasons with the club. His goal also made him the first player to score in three separate DFB-Pokal finals. On 13 July, after winning the third-place match at the 2014 World Cup, Louis van Gaal invited Robben to follow him to Manchester United, but the latter ruled out the move. He finished the 2013–14 season with 21 goals in 45 appearances.

==== 2014–18: 100th Bayern goal and continued domestic success ====
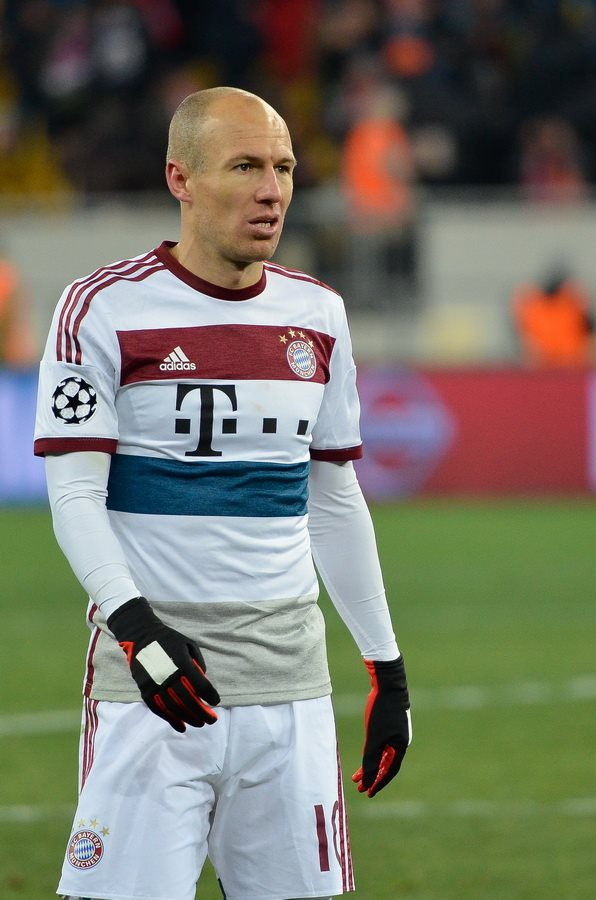
Robben playing against Shakhtar Donetsk in the Champions League in February 2015

In Bayern's opening match of the 2014–15 Bundesliga season, Robben scored one goal and assisted the other as the team defeated VfL Wolfsburg 2–1 on 22 August 2014. On 1 November, he scored the winning goal from a penalty kick against Borussia Dortmund in Der Klassiker. On 16 December 2014, Robben scored his 100th competitive goal for Bayern Munich in a home match against SC Freiburg.

On 21 February 2015, Robben scored twice in a 6–0 win against SC Paderborn, giving him the record of scoring against every Bundesliga team he had faced. He ended 2014–15 alongside teammate Robert Lewandowski as joint second-top goalscorer in the Bundesliga with 17 goals. This was despite the player missing the last two months of the season through injury. He finished the 2014–15 season with 19 goals in 30 appearances.

Robben started his 2015–16 season by scoring the opening goal of the DFL-Supercup against VfL Wolfsburg. The match finished in a 1–1 draw, and Robben scored in the subsequent shootout, however Bayern were defeated.

Robben's first goal of the Bundesliga season came from a penalty kick in a 3–0 defeat of Bayer Leverkusen on 29 August. However, an injury suffered six days later when playing for the Netherlands against Iceland in qualification for UEFA Euro 2016 kept him out of Bayern's next nine fixtures. On 24 October, Robben returned to the Bayern team, playing 65 minutes and scoring the opening goal of a 4–0 win against 1. FC Köln, the club's 1,000th Bundesliga victory. He made his first Champions League appearance of the season on 4 November, scoring after coming on as a substitute in Bayern's 5–1 win over Arsenal. He finished the 2015–16 season with seven goals in 22 appearances.

Robben, recovering from his injury, was chosen for a friendly against SV Lippstadt 08. He scored a goal, shortly before being substituted because of another injury in the 36th minute. Robben's six-week injury caused him to miss several matches. He returned to training and remained on the bench until 21 September Bundesliga match against Hertha BSC, where he came on instead of Thomas Müller and scored in the 3–0 victory. Robben scored in both first and second leg of the round-of-sixteen tie against Arsenal as Bayern won 10–2 on aggregate. He finished the 2016–17 season with 16 goals in 37 appearances.

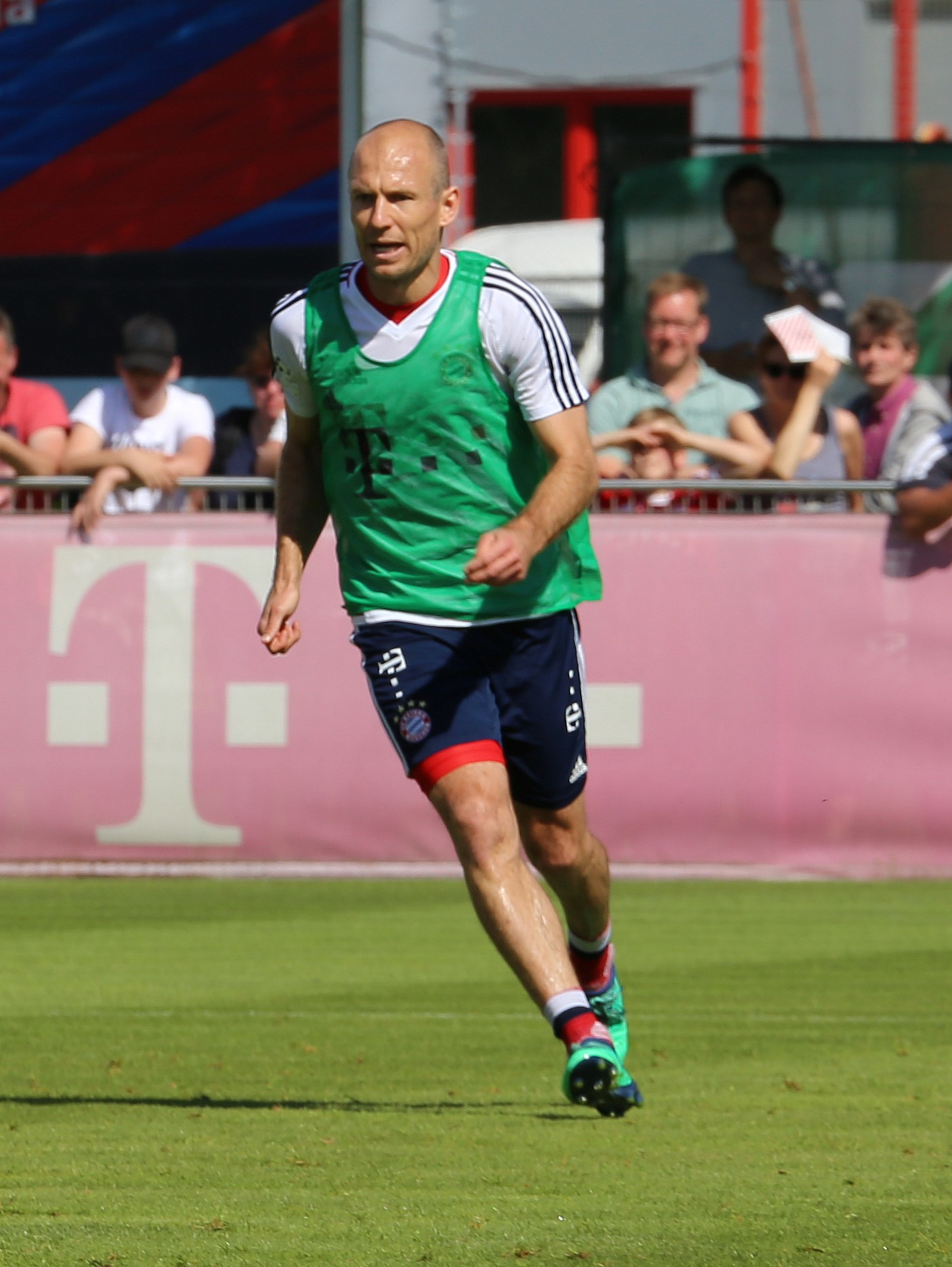
Robben training in May 2018

On 16 January 2017, Robben signed a one-year extension with Bayern, keeping him at the club until the end of the 2017–18 season. He scored a goal with his right foot for the first time since February 2015 in a 4–0 victory over 1. FSV Mainz 05 on 16 September. On 18 October, Robben made his 100th Champions League appearance in a 3–0 victory over Celtic F.C. in the group stage match of the competition. On 4 November, Robben scored a stunning goal in a 3–1 away win over their Borussia Dortmund in Der Klassiker which made him Bayern's most successful non-German scorer in the Bundesliga and the most successful Dutch goal scorer in the Bundesliga. He scored twice in a 6–0 away victory over SC Paderborn as Bayern went on through to the semi-final of DFB-Pokal on 6 February 2018. On 25 April, he had an injury within the first ten minutes of the Champions League semi-final first leg against Real Madrid, which forced him to miss the rest of the season.

Robben won his seventh Bundesliga title and set a Dutch record by winning his 11th career domestic league title surpassing Dutch legend Johan Cruyff's 10 career domestic league titles. He finished the 2017–18 season with seven goals in 34 appearances.

On 11 May 2018, Robben signed a one-year contract; extending his stay until the end of the 2018–19 season.

==== 2018–19: Final season ====
On 12 August, he started the season by playing in the 2018 DFL-Supercup for 58 minutes and won the title as Bayern defeated Eintracht Frankfurt with a 5–0 victory. On 27 November, Robben scored two goals in a 5–1 win against S.L. Benfica in the Champions League. On 2 December, Robben said in an interview: "I can say that this is my last year [at Bayern] and it is good like that. I think it is the right moment after ten years. The club moves on and I may move on. It is the end of a very good and long period."

On 18 May 2019, he scored his last league goal for Bayern in Bundesliga making it a 5–1 victory against Frankfurt, which meant Bayern winning their 28th Bundesliga title and Robben winning his eighth. On 25 May 2019, Robben won his fifth DFB-Pokal as Bayern defeated RB Leipzig 3–0 in the 2019 DFB-Pokal Final. He finished the 2018–19 season with six goals in 19 appearances. In 201 Bundesliga matches he scored 99 goals.

On 4 July 2019, Robben announced his decision to retire from football.

=== Return to Groningen ===
On 27 June 2020, Robben announced his return to the game, signing with FC Groningen, the club he started his career with, in an effort to help the team recover from COVID-19 setbacks. He scored his first goal for Groningen in a pre-season friendly against Arminia Bielefeld. On 13 September 2020, he made his league debut for Groningen against PSV, but he was substituted after only 28 minutes due to injury. After a nearly seven-month absence, he made his return as a substitute in a loss to SC Heerenveen on 11 April 2021. Robben returned in Groningen's starting line-up on 9 May; he provided two assists in a 4–0 win at Emmen.

On 15 July 2021, Robben announced his second and final retirement from professional football.

== International career ==
=== Early career ===
In April 2003, Robben made his Netherlands international debut in a friendly match against Portugal at age 19.

His international tournament debut occurred at UEFA Euro 2004 when coach Dick Advocaat called up younger players, such as Wesley Sneijder and John Heitinga. During the group stage of the tournament, Advocaat replaced Robben in the 66th minute to defend a 2–1 leading victory against the Czech Republic. However, the Czechs later scored two goals and won 3–2, which led to criticism about Advocaat's decision. In the quarter-finals, Robben scored the deciding kick in the penalty shootout between the Netherlands and Sweden, making sure that at the fifth attempt, the Dutch finally won a shootout.

=== 2006 FIFA World Cup and UEFA Euro 2008 ===
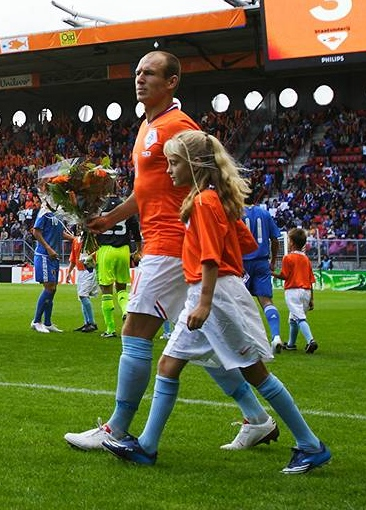
Robben in 2009 prior to a match against Japan

Robben played in his first 2006 FIFA World Cup qualifier in 2006. In six games for the Netherlands, Robben scored two goals. The Netherlands qualified for the 2006 World Cup and in their opening match against Serbia and Montenegro, Robben scored the winning goal in the 18th minute, and was named the Player of the match. In the match against the Ivory Coast, Robben received this award the second time, thus becoming one of the eight players in the tournament to have won multiple Man of the Match awards.

During Euro 2008, new Dutch manager Marco van Basten changed the side's formation to 4–2–3–1, preferring the midfield trio of Rafael van der Vaart, Wesley Sneijder, and Dirk Kuyt, with Robben left to battle for a position with Robin van Persie on the wing. In the group match against France, which the Netherlands won 4–1, Robben was brought on at half-time. He dragged the ball out of reach of a defender near the halfway line and paced his way ahead of three defenders, then crossed straight to Van Persie, who powered a shot into the goal past France goalkeeper Grégory Coupet. At 2–0, Thierry Henry scored a goal for France, making it 2–1, but almost directly after the restart, Robben was played through by Sneijder and he ran at the France goal and was forced into an acute angle, but despite the angle, he shot the ball into the net past Coupet.

=== 2010 World Cup ===
Robben was selected by new manager Bert van Marwijk for the final 23-man Dutch squad for the 2010 World Cup. In the team's last friendly match against Hungary, just before its flight to South Africa on 4 June, Robben fell awkwardly and picked up a hamstring injury, causing concern over his fitness for the tournament. On 5 June, Van Marwijk announced that he had "decided not to summon any substitute for Arjen. I want to give him every chance to still participate in the World Cup". On 12 June, Robben arrived in South Africa to join the team. He was an unused substitute for the opening match against Denmark as they coasted to a 2–0 victory, and again in the 1–0 victory against Japan. He came on in the 73rd minute against Cameroon in their 2–1 victory, hitting the post from which Klaas-Jan Huntelaar scored from the rebound.

On 28 June 2010, Robben started his first match against Slovakia in which he went on to score the first goal in the second round as the Netherlands won 2–1. He also won the man of the match award. Robben scored the third goal with a well-placed header in the semi-finals against Uruguay which the Netherlands won 3–2 to reach the final. Robben played for the full match in the final as the Netherlands lost 1–0 against Spain. Robben had Netherlands's best opportunity of the match when played in on goal by Wesley Sneijder in the 62nd minute of the match, but was denied by Iker Casillas. Robben was nominated for the 2010 World Cup Golden Ball, the tournament's best player, which was won by Diego Forlán.

=== Euro 2012 ===
Robben was selected to play for the Netherlands at Euro 2012. He started in the first group stage match, a 1–0 loss against Denmark, in which he hit the post with a curled effort. In the next match, a 2–1 loss to Germany, he hopped over the advertising boards and walked the long way round after being subbed off for Dirk Kuyt because he thought he could inspire the Netherlands to a win. After a 2–1 loss against Portugal, the Netherlands were knocked out with three straight losses.

=== 2014 World Cup and retirement ===
I always prefer to be honest and I said there was one foul in the first half where I went to the ground when the opponent took his leg away at the last moment ... It had nothing to do with the game and the penalty was a clear penalty. I apologise for the action in the first-half but that's football ...

— Robben admits to diving against Mexico in 2014, but argues that it only happened during the less-crucial first half.

In the Netherlands' first match of the 2014 World Cup, Robben scored two goals in a 5–1 win over Spain. In the Netherlands' second group stage match, a 3–2 win over Australia, Robben scored the team's opening goal as they qualified for the knockout stage. In the round of 16 knock-out match with Mexico, the Netherlands won on a penalty awarded after Robben went down following a challenge from Rafael Márquez. The Associated Press said that Robben's "theatrical" fall "did little to defuse the debate about his reputation for diving". Robben maintained that the penalty was correct but admitted to falling easily earlier in the match, telling a Dutch TV channel that "the one [at the end] was a penalty, but the other one was a dive in the first half. I shouldn't be doing that".

In the quarter-final, Robben scored the Netherlands' second kick in a 4–3 penalty shootout victory against Costa Rica. On 11 July, Robben was named on the ten-man shortlist for FIFA's Golden Ball award for the tournament's best player. On 28 August 2015, Robben was named captain of the Netherlands, replacing Robin van Persie.

On 10 October 2017, Robben retired from international football after the team's unsuccessful 2018 World Cup qualifying campaign. He made 96 appearances between 2003 and 2017 for the Oranje and scored 37 goals.

== Style of play ==
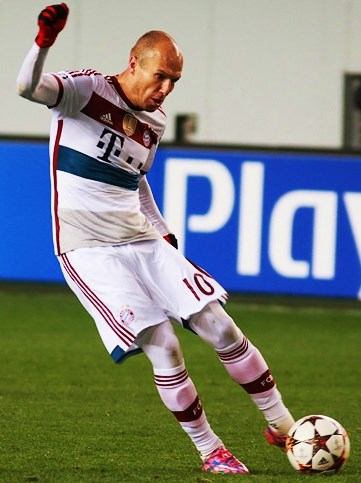
Robben taking a shot during the 2014–15 Champions League

Throughout most of his career, Robben was regarded as one of the best wingers in the world, with ESPN stating he is "able to take on and beat defenders at the drop of a hat, Robben's ability to get to the byline and deliver in accurate crosses instils fear into any defence". Usually deployed on the right wing, Robben employed his signature move by cutting inside on his stronger left foot to move to a more central attacking position, and used his speed and dribbling skills to take on defenders until he found the space to make an attempt on goal. Robben had a noticeable preference for using his dominant foot throughout his career: he scored 134 league goals with his left foot, while only ten league goals came with his weaker right foot.

During the course of a match Robben would often drift to the left wing, with his teammate, in the case of Bayern Munich, Franck Ribéry, switching over to the right. Together they were affectionately referred to by the nickname Robbery. Another factor in his playing style is his relationship with the right-sided full-back. At Bayern, this partnership with Philipp Lahm had benefits for the team's efficiency and chemistry. Robben's defensive work improved when he went to Bayern where he often tracked back and covered for his partner when he pushed forward and became a temporary right back.

Robben was often accused of diving, and at times he openly admitted to the charges. In December 2011, Robben apologised for a dive against VfL Bochum in a DFB-Pokal match which earned him a yellow card, saying, "I must not do things like this." In July 2014, Robben admitted to diving in the first half of Netherlands' match against Mexico in the last 16 round of the 2014 World Cup, but maintained that he had not dived for the decisive penalty he won in stoppage time which Netherlands converted to win 2–1. Following the incident, Robben's former manager at Chelsea, José Mourinho, said that Robben's speed and creativity cause opponents who cannot stop him to foul him, but "sometimes [Robben] tries to get an advantage, or to get a penalty".

Robben is a world class player. He can, as we know from experience, decide a game on his own. To stop him, you have to double him.

— Borussia Dortmund's Kevin Großkreutz on having two players mark Robben.

Earlier in his career, Robben also drew criticism from pundits and other players for his perceived selfishness, his lack of composure in important games, and for his struggles with injuries throughout his career, which were initially thought to have limited his potential; however, he worked to develop his physique and the mental aspect of his game, and became a more consistent and world class team player as his career progressed, who was known for providing a good number of assists as well as scoring goals himself.

== Post-retirement ==
In August 2025, Robben competed in the CUPRA FIP Bronze tournament in Westerbork, appearing on the professional padel circuit. According to the International Padel Federation (FIP), he and partner Werner Lootsma won a qualifying match before being eliminated in the first round of the main draw.

== Personal life ==
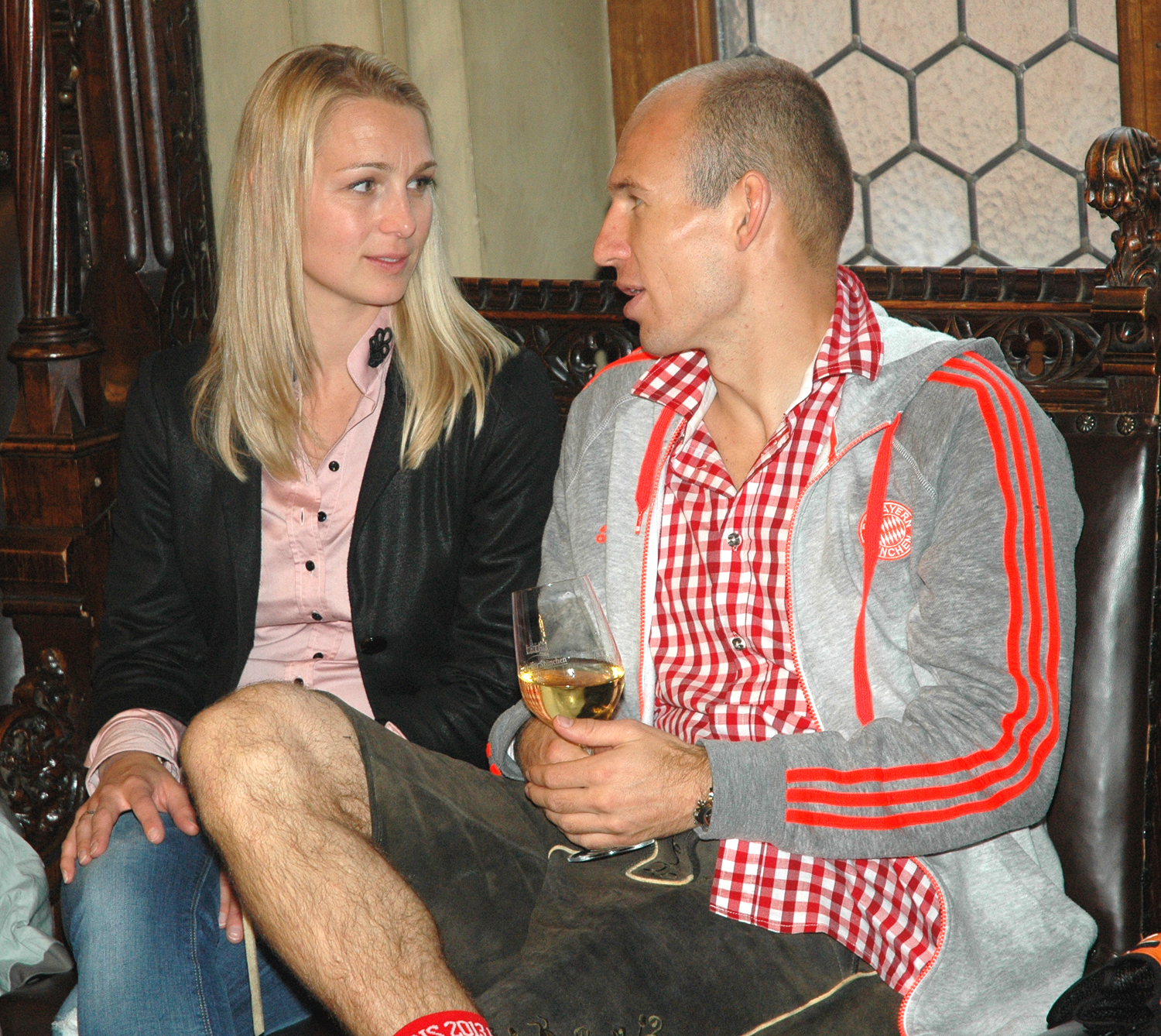
Robben with his wife Bernadien in 2014

Robben married his girlfriend Bernadien Eillert on 9 June 2007 in Groningen. The two met while in high school in the city, at the Kamerlingh Onnes, and have two sons, Luka (born 2008) and Kai (born 2012) and a daughter, Lynn (born 2010). Robben's father, Hans, worked as his agent.

== Sponsorship ==
Robben has a sponsorship deal with German sportswear and equipment supplier Adidas. Robben featured in EA Sports' FIFA video game series before his retirement, and was the third-highest-rated player in FIFA 15.

== Career statistics ==
=== Club ===
Appearances and goals by club, season and competition
| Club | Season | League | | | National cup (Note: Includes KNVB Cup, FA Cup, Copa del Rey, DFB-Pokal) | | League cup (Note: Includes Football League Cup) | | Continental (Note: All appearances in UEFA Champions League, unless otherwise noted) | | Other | | Total | |
| Club | Season | Division | Apps | Goals | Apps | Goals | Apps | Goals | Apps | Goals | Apps | Goals | Apps | Goals |
|---|---|---|---|---|---|---|---|---|---|---|---|---|---|---|
| Groningen | 2000–01 | Eredivisie | 18 | 2 | 0 | 0 | — | | — | | — | | 18 | 2 |
| Groningen | 2001–02 | Eredivisie | 28 | 6 | 6 | 4 | — | | — | | — | | 34 | 10 |
| Groningen | Total | | 46 | 8 | 6 | 4 | — | | — | | — | | 52 | 12 |
| PSV | 2002–03 | Eredivisie | 33 | 12 | 3 | 0 | — | | 4 | 1 | 1 (Note: Appearance in Johan Cruyff Shield) | 0 | 41 | 13 |
| PSV | 2003–04 | Eredivisie | 23 | 5 | 2 | 0 | — | | 8 (Note: Six appearances and two goals in UEFA Champions League, two appearances in UEFA Cup) | 2 | 1 | 1 | 34 | 8 |
| PSV | Total | | 56 | 17 | 5 | 0 | — | | 12 | 3 | 2 | 1 | 75 | 21 |
| Chelsea | 2004–05 | Premier League | 18 | 7 | 2 | 0 | 4 | 1 | 5 | 1 | — | | 29 | 9 |
| Chelsea | 2005–06 | Premier League | 28 | 6 | 4 | 1 | 1 | 0 | 6 | 0 | 1 (Note: Appearance in FA Community Shield) | 0 | 40 | 7 |
| Chelsea | 2006–07 | Premier League | 21 | 2 | 4 | 0 | 3 | 0 | 8 | 1 | 1 | 0 | 37 | 3 |
| Chelsea | Total | | 67 | 15 | 10 | 1 | 8 | 1 | 19 | 2 | 2 | 0 | 106 | 19 |
| Real Madrid | 2007–08 | La Liga | 21 | 4 | 2 | 1 | — | | 5 | 0 | 0 | 0 | 28 | 5 |
| Real Madrid | 2008–09 | La Liga | 29 | 7 | 0 | 0 | — | | 6 | 1 | 2 (Note: Appearances in Supercopa de España) | 0 | 37 | 8 |
| Real Madrid | Total | | 50 | 11 | 2 | 1 | — | | 11 | 1 | 2 | 0 | 65 | 13 |
| Bayern Munich | 2009–10 | Bundesliga | 24 | 16 | 3 | 3 | — | | 10 | 4 | — | | 37 | 23 |
| Bayern Munich | 2010–11 | Bundesliga | 14 | 12 | 2 | 1 | — | | 2 | 0 | 0 | 0 | 18 | 13 |
| Bayern Munich | 2011–12 | Bundesliga | 24 | 12 | 3 | 2 | — | | 9 | 5 | — | | 36 | 19 |
| Bayern Munich | 2012–13 | Bundesliga | 16 | 5 | 5 | 4 | — | | 9 | 4 | 1 (Note: Appearance in DFL-Supercup) | 0 | 31 | 13 |
| Bayern Munich | 2013–14 | Bundesliga | 28 | 11 | 5 | 4 | — | | 10 | 4 | 2 (Note: One appearance and two goals in DFL-Supercup, one appearance in UEFA Super Cup) | 2 | 45 | 21 |
| Bayern Munich | 2014–15 | Bundesliga | 21 | 17 | 2 | 0 | — | | 7 | 2 | 0 | 0 | 30 | 19 |
| Bayern Munich | 2015–16 | Bundesliga | 15 | 4 | 3 | 0 | — | | 3 | 2 | 1 | 1 | 22 | 7 |
| Bayern Munich | 2016–17 | Bundesliga | 26 | 13 | 3 | 0 | — | | 8 | 3 | 0 | 0 | 37 | 16 |
| Bayern Munich | 2017–18 | Bundesliga | 21 | 5 | 4 | 2 | — | | 9 | 0 | 0 | 0 | 34 | 7 |
| Bayern Munich | 2018–19 | Bundesliga | 12 | 4 | 2 | 0 | — | | 4 | 2 | 1 | 0 | 19 | 6 |
| Bayern Munich | Total | | 201 | 99 | 32 | 16 | — | | 71 | 26 | 5 | 3 | 309 | 144 |
| Groningen | 2020–21 | Eredivisie | 6 | 0 | 0 | 0 | — | | — | | 1 (Note: Appearance in Eredivisie European competition play-offs) | 0 | 7 | 0 |
| Career total | | | 426 | 150 | 55 | 22 | 8 | 1 | 113 | 32 | 12 | 4 | 614 | 209 |

=== International ===
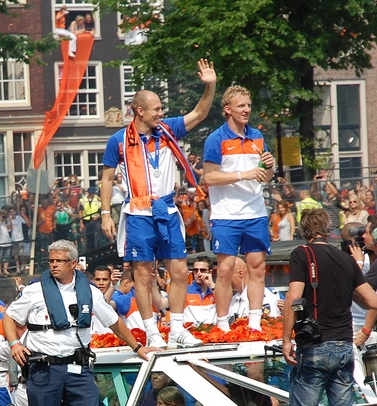
Robben with Dutch teammate Dirk Kuyt

Appearances and goals by national team and year
| National team | Year | Apps | Goals |
|---|---|---|---|
| Netherlands | 2003 | 3 | 1 |
| Netherlands | 2004 | 8 | 2 |
| Netherlands | 2005 | 6 | 3 |
| Netherlands | 2006 | 10 | 2 |
| Netherlands | 2007 | 4 | 0 |
| Netherlands | 2008 | 6 | 2 |
| Netherlands | 2009 | 8 | 1 |
| Netherlands | 2010 | 7 | 4 |
| Netherlands | 2011 | 1 | 0 |
| Netherlands | 2012 | 10 | 2 |
| Netherlands | 2013 | 10 | 5 |
| Netherlands | 2014 | 13 | 6 |
| Netherlands | 2015 | 2 | 2 |
| Netherlands | 2016 | 1 | 1 |
| Netherlands | 2017 | 7 | 6 |
| Total | | 96 | 37 |

Robben scored his first ever international goal in October 2003 during a UEFA Euro 2004 qualifier against Moldova. He ultimately decided to retire from international duty in 2017 following their unsuccessful qualifying campaign for the 2018 FIFA World Cup.

Scores and results list Netherlands' goal tally first, score column indicates score after each Robben goal.

List of international goals scored by Arjen Robben
| No. | Date | Venue | Opponent | Score | Result | Competition | Ref. |
|---|---|---|---|---|---|---|---|
| 1 | 11 October 2003 | Philips Stadion, Eindhoven, Netherlands | Moldova | 5–0 | 5–0 | UEFA Euro 2004 qualification | |
| 2 | 18 February 2004 | Amsterdam Arena, Amsterdam, Netherlands | United States | 1–0 | 1–0 | Friendly | |
| 3 | 17 November 2004 | Mini Estadi, Barcelona, Spain | Andorra | 2–0 | 3–0 | 2006 FIFA World Cup qualification | |
| 4 | 4 June 2005 | De Kuip, Rotterdam, Netherlands | Romania | 1–0 | 2–0 | 2006 FIFA World Cup qualification | |
| 5 | 17 August 2005 | De Kuip, Rotterdam, Netherlands | Germany | 1–0 | 2–2 | Friendly | |
| 6 | 17 August 2005 | De Kuip, Rotterdam, Netherlands | Germany | 2–0 | 2–2 | Friendly | |
| 7 | 11 June 2006 | Zentralstadion, Leipzig, Germany | Serbia and Montenegro | 1–0 | 1–0 | 2006 FIFA World Cup | |
| 8 | 16 August 2006 | Lansdowne Road, Dublin, Republic of Ireland | Republic of Ireland | 2–0 | 4–0 | Friendly | |
| 9 | 1 June 2008 | De Kuip, Rotterdam, Netherlands | Wales | 1–0 | 2–0 | Friendly | |
| 10 | 13 June 2008 | Stade de Suisse, Bern, Switzerland | France | 3–1 | 4–1 | UEFA Euro 2008 | |
| 11 | 10 June 2009 | De Kuip, Rotterdam, Netherlands | Norway | 2–0 | 2–0 | 2010 FIFA World Cup qualification | |
| 12 | 5 June 2010 | Amsterdam Arena, Amsterdam, Netherlands | Hungary | 3–1 | 6–1 | Friendly | |
| 13 | 5 June 2010 | Amsterdam Arena, Amsterdam, Netherlands | Hungary | 6–1 | 6–1 | Friendly | |
| 14 | 28 June 2010 | Moses Mabhida Stadium, Durban, South Africa | Slovakia | 1–0 | 2–1 | 2010 FIFA World Cup | |
| 15 | 6 July 2010 | Cape Town Stadium, Cape Town, South Africa | Uruguay | 3–1 | 3–2 | 2010 FIFA World Cup | |
| 16 | 29 February 2012 | Wembley Stadium, London, England | England | 1–0 | 3–2 | Friendly | |
| 17 | 29 February 2012 | Wembley Stadium, London, England | England | 3–2 | 3–2 | Friendly | |
| 18 | 7 June 2013 | Gelora Bung Karno Stadium, Jakarta, Indonesia | Indonesia | 3–0 | 3–0 | Friendly | |
| 19 | 6 September 2013 | A. Le Coq Arena, Tallinn, Estonia | Estonia | 1–0 | 2–2 | 2014 FIFA World Cup qualification | |
| 20 | 11 October 2013 | Amsterdam Arena, Amsterdam, Netherlands | Hungary | 8–1 | 8–1 | 2014 FIFA World Cup qualification | |
| 21 | 15 October 2013 | Şükrü Saracoğlu Stadium, Istanbul, Turkey | Turkey | 1–0 | 2–0 | 2014 FIFA World Cup qualification | |
| 22 | 16 November 2013 | Cristal Arena, Genk, Belgium | Japan | 2–0 | 2–2 | Friendly | |
| 23 | 4 June 2014 | Amsterdam Arena, Amsterdam, Netherlands | Wales | 1–0 | 2–0 | Friendly | |
| 24 | 13 June 2014 | Itaipava Arena Fonte Nova, Salvador, Brazil | Spain | 2–1 | 5–1 | 2014 FIFA World Cup | |
| 25 | 13 June 2014 | Itaipava Arena Fonte Nova, Salvador, Brazil | Spain | 5–1 | 5–1 | 2014 FIFA World Cup | |
| 26 | 18 June 2014 | Estádio Beira-Rio, Porto Alegre, Brazil | Australia | 1–0 | 3–2 | 2014 FIFA World Cup | |
| 27 | 16 November 2014 | Amsterdam Arena, Amsterdam, Netherlands | Latvia | 2–0 | 6–0 | UEFA Euro 2016 qualification | |
| 28 | 16 November 2014 | Amsterdam Arena, Amsterdam, Netherlands | Latvia | 5–0 | 6–0 | UEFA Euro 2016 qualification | |
| 29 | 16 November 2015 | Cardiff City Stadium, Cardiff, Wales | Wales | 2–1 | 3–2 | Friendly | |
| 30 | 16 November 2015 | Cardiff City Stadium, Cardiff, Wales | Wales | 3–2 | 3–2 | Friendly | |
| 31 | 13 November 2016 | Stade Josy Barthel, Luxembourg City, Luxembourg | Luxembourg | 1–0 | 3–1 | 2018 FIFA World Cup qualification | |
| 32 | 4 June 2017 | De Kuip, Rotterdam, Netherlands | Ivory Coast | 2–0 | 5–0 | Friendly | |
| 33 | 9 June 2017 | De Kuip, Rotterdam, Netherlands | Luxembourg | 1–0 | 5–0 | 2018 FIFA World Cup qualification | |
| 34 | 3 September 2017 | Amsterdam Arena, Amsterdam, Netherlands | Bulgaria | 2–0 | 3–1 | 2018 FIFA World Cup qualification | |
| 35 | 7 October 2017 | Borisov Arena, Barysaw, Belarus | Belarus | 2–1 | 3–1 | 2018 FIFA World Cup qualification | |
| 36 | 10 October 2017 | Amsterdam Arena, Amsterdam, Netherlands | Sweden | 1–0 | 2–0 | 2018 FIFA World Cup qualification | |
| 37 | 10 October 2017 | Amsterdam Arena, Amsterdam, Netherlands | Sweden | 2–0 | 2–0 | 2018 FIFA World Cup qualification | |

== Honours ==
PSV

- Eredivisie: 2002–03
- Johan Cruyff Shield: 2003

Chelsea

- Premier League: 2004–05, 2005–06
- FA Cup: 2006–07
- Football League Cup: 2004–05, 2006–07
- FA Community Shield: 2005

Real Madrid

- La Liga: 2007–08
- Supercopa de España: 2008

Bayern Munich

- Bundesliga: 2009–10, 2012–13, 2013–14, 2014–15, 2015–16, 2016–17, 2017–18, 2018–19
- DFB-Pokal: 2009–10, 2012–13, 2013–14, 2015–16, 2018–19
- DFL-Supercup: 2012, 2018
- UEFA Champions League: 2012–13
- UEFA Super Cup: 2013

Netherlands

- FIFA World Cup runner-up: 2010; third place: 2014

Individual

- Johan Cruyff Trophy: 2002–03
- UEFA European Championship top assist provider: 2004
- Premier League Player of the Month: November 2004
- PFA Team of the Year: 2004–05 Premier League
- ESM Team of the Year: 2004–05, 2009–10, 2014–15
- Bravo Award: 2005
- Goal of the Month in Germany: January 2010, March 2010, April 2010, February 2013
- VDV Bundesliga Player of the Season: 2009–10
- The kicker Man of the Year: 2010
- Footballer of the Year in Germany: 2010
- UEFA Team of the Year: 2011, 2014
- UEFA Champions League Team of the Season: 2013–14
- FIFA World Cup Bronze Ball: 2014
- FIFA World Cup All-Star Team: 2014
- FIFA FIFPro World XI: 2014
- Dutch Sportsman of the year: 2014

== See also ==
- List of footballers with 100 or more UEFA Champions League appearances
- List of FIFA World Cup top goalscorers
- List of athletes who came out of retirement
