= Thorsten Kinhöfer =

German football referee

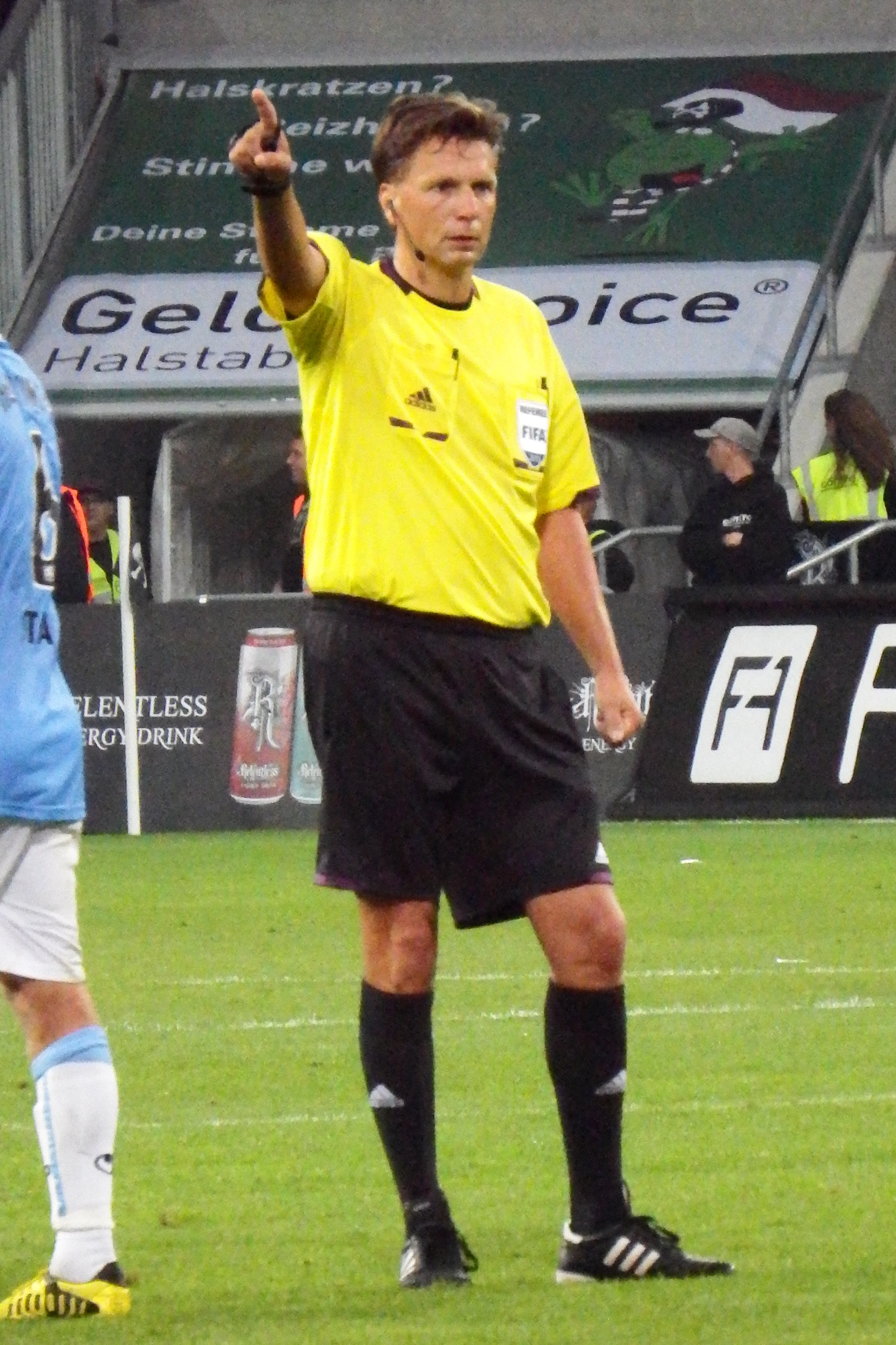
- Kinhöfer in 2013
- Full name: Thorsten Kinhöfer
- Born: 27 June 1968 (age 58); Wanne-Eickel, West Germany
- Other occupation: Comptroller

Domestic
Years	League	Role
1994–2015	DFB	Referee
1997–2015	2nd Bundesliga	Referee
2002–2015	Bundesliga	Referee

International
Years	League	Role
2006–2013	FIFA listed	Referee

Thorsten Kinhöfer (born 27 June 1968) is a former German football referee in the Fußball-Bundesliga.

== Refereeing career ==
Kinhöfer is appointed to matches under the auspices of the German FA since 1994. He was added to the list of 2nd Bundesliga referees in 1997 and promoted to Bundesliga status in 2002. In 2010, he officiated the Final of the DFB-Pokal.

Kinhöfer is on the FIFA eligible list since January 2006. He was also appointed to matches of the South Korean K-League in 2003, the Qatar Stars League in 2006, 2007, 2008 and 2010 and the Saudi Professional League in 2008 as a guest referee.

Kinhöfer retired from officiating in 2015 because he reached the age limit for German referees, which is 47.

== Personal life ==
Kinhöfer lives in Herne and works as a Comptroller at the Municipal Utility District of the city.
