= 2010 DFB-Pokal final =

- Match programme cover
- Event: 2009–10 DFB-Pokal
Werder Bremen	Bayern Munich
0	4
- Date: 15 May 2010
- Venue: Olympiastadion, Berlin
- Referee: Thorsten Kinhöfer (Herne)
- Attendance: 75,420
- Weather: Light rain 8 °C (46 °F); 89% humidity

The 2009–10 DFB-Pokal season came to a close on 15 May 2010 when Bayern Munich played defending champions Werder Bremen at the Olympiastadion in Berlin. Bayern thrashed Bremen 4-0 with goals from Robben, Olić, Ribéry, and Schweinsteiger. The title capped off a successful season, with Bayern winning the domestic double of the Fußball-Bundesliga and the DFB-Pokal. These successes were Bayern's 22nd league and 15th cup titles. Bayern were also in line for The Treble but lost to Internazionale of Milan, 2-0 in the Champions League Final at Madrid's Santiago Bernabéu Stadium on 22 May.

== Route to the final ==
The DFB-Pokal began with 64 teams in a single-elimination knockout cup competition. There were a total of five rounds leading up to the final. Teams were drawn against each other, and the winner after 90 minutes advanced. If still tied, 30 minutes of extra time were played. If the score was still level, a penalty shoot-out was used to determine the winner.

Note: In all results below, the score of the finalist is given first (H: home; A: away).

Werder Bremen		Round	Bayern Munich	
Opponent	Result	2009–10 DFB-Pokal	Opponent	Result
Union Berlin (A)	5–0	First round	SpVgg Neckarelz (A)	3–1
FC St. Pauli (H)	2–1	Second round	Rot-Weiß Oberhausen (H)	5–0
1. FC Kaiserslautern (H)	3–0	Round of 16	Eintracht Frankfurt (A)	4–0
1899 Hoffenheim (H)	2–1	Quarter-finals	Greuther Fürth (H)	6–2
FC Augsburg (H)	2–0	Semi-finals	Schalke 04 (A)	1–0 (a.e.t.)

== Match ==
=== Details ===
15 May 2010
20:00 CEST

Werder Bremen	0–4	Bayern Munich
	Report	Robben 35' (pen.); Olić 51'; Ribéry 63'; Schweinsteiger 83'

Olympiastadion, Berlin
Attendance: 75,420
Referee: Thorsten Kinhöfer (Herne)

Werder Bremen	Bayern Munich

GK	1	(Germany) Tim Wiese
RB	8	(Germany) Clemens Fritz	(yellow card) 66'
CB	29	(Germany) Per Mertesacker
CB	4	(Brazil) Naldo
LB	2	(Germany) Sebastian Boenisch
CM	22	(Germany) Torsten Frings (c)	(yellow card) 56' (yellow-red card) 76'
CM	44	(Germany) Philipp Bargfrede		(substituted off) 46'
RW	6	(Germany) Tim Borowski	(yellow card) 68'	(substituted off) 70'
AM	11	(Germany) Mesut Özil
LW	14	(Germany) Aaron Hunt		(substituted off) 54'
CF	24	(Peru) Claudio Pizarro
Substitutes:
GK	42	(Germany) Felix Wiedwald
DF	15	(Austria) Sebastian Prödl
DF	16	(Tunisia) Aymen Abdennour
MF	10	(Germany) Marko Marin		(substituted on) 54'
MF	20	(Denmark) Daniel Jensen		(substituted on) 70'
MF	25	(Germany) Peter Niemeyer
FW	23	(Portugal) Hugo Almeida		(substituted on) 46'
Manager:
(Germany) Thomas Schaaf

GK	22	(Germany) Hans-Jörg Butt
RB	21	(Germany) Philipp Lahm
CB	5	(Belgium) Daniel Van Buyten
CB	6	(Argentina) Martín Demichelis
LB	28	(Germany) Holger Badstuber
CM	17	(Netherlands) Mark van Bommel (c)	(yellow card) 11'
CM	31	(Germany) Bastian Schweinsteiger
RW	10	(Netherlands) Arjen Robben		(substituted off) 86'
AM	25	(Germany) Thomas Müller		(substituted off) 77'
LW	7	(France) Franck Ribéry
CF	11	(Croatia) Ivica Olić	(yellow card) 19'	(substituted off) 80'
Substitutes:
GK	1	(Germany) Michael Rensing
DF	26	(Germany) Diego Contento
MF	8	(Turkey) Hamit Altıntop		(substituted on) 86'
MF	23	(Croatia) Danijel Pranjić
MF	44	(Ukraine) Anatoliy Tymoshchuk		(substituted on) 77'
FW	18	(Germany) Miroslav Klose		(substituted on) 80'
FW	33	(Germany) Mario Gómez
Manager:
(Netherlands) Louis van Gaal

Assistant referees:
Detlef Scheppe (Wenden)
Christian Fischer (Hemer)
Fourth official:
Jochen Drees (Münster-Sarmsheim)

Match rules

- 90 minutes.
- 30 minutes of extra time if necessary.
- Penalty shoot-out if scores still level.
- Seven named substitutes, of which up to three may be used.
