= Tom Geißler =

German footballer

Personal information
- Full name: Tom Geißler
- Date of birth: 12 September 1983 (age 43)
- Place of birth: Oschatz, East Germany
- Height: 1.74 m (5 ft 9 in)
- Position: Midfielder

Youth career
- –1996: FSV Oschatz
- 1996–2000: VfB Leipzig
- 2000–2002: FC Sachsen Leipzig

Senior career*
Years	Team	Apps	(Gls)
2002–2003	FC Sachsen Leipzig	53	(9)
2004–2005	Wacker Burghausen	41	(4)
2005–2006	Mainz 05	15	(0)
2006–2008	Erzgebirge Aue	43	(4)
2008–2009	VfL Osnabrück	8	(1)
2009–2010	TuS Koblenz	23	(0)
2010–2012	RB Leipzig	51	(3)
2012–2015	Carl Zeiss Jena	44	(5)
2012–2013	→ Carl Zeiss Jena II	4	(0)
2015–2016	SSV Markranstädt	11	(2)
Total		293	(28)

International career
	Germany U-21	1	(0)
- * Club domestic league appearances and goals

Tom Geißler (born 12 September 1983) is a German former professional footballer who played as a midfielder.

== Career ==
Geißler made his debut on the professional league level in the 2. Bundesliga for SV Wacker Burghausen on 31 January 2004 coming on as a substitute in the 59th minute of a game against Alemannia Aachen.

He ended his career following a season-long stint at SSV Markranstädt in the Oberliga.
