= Daniel Embers =

German footballer and coach

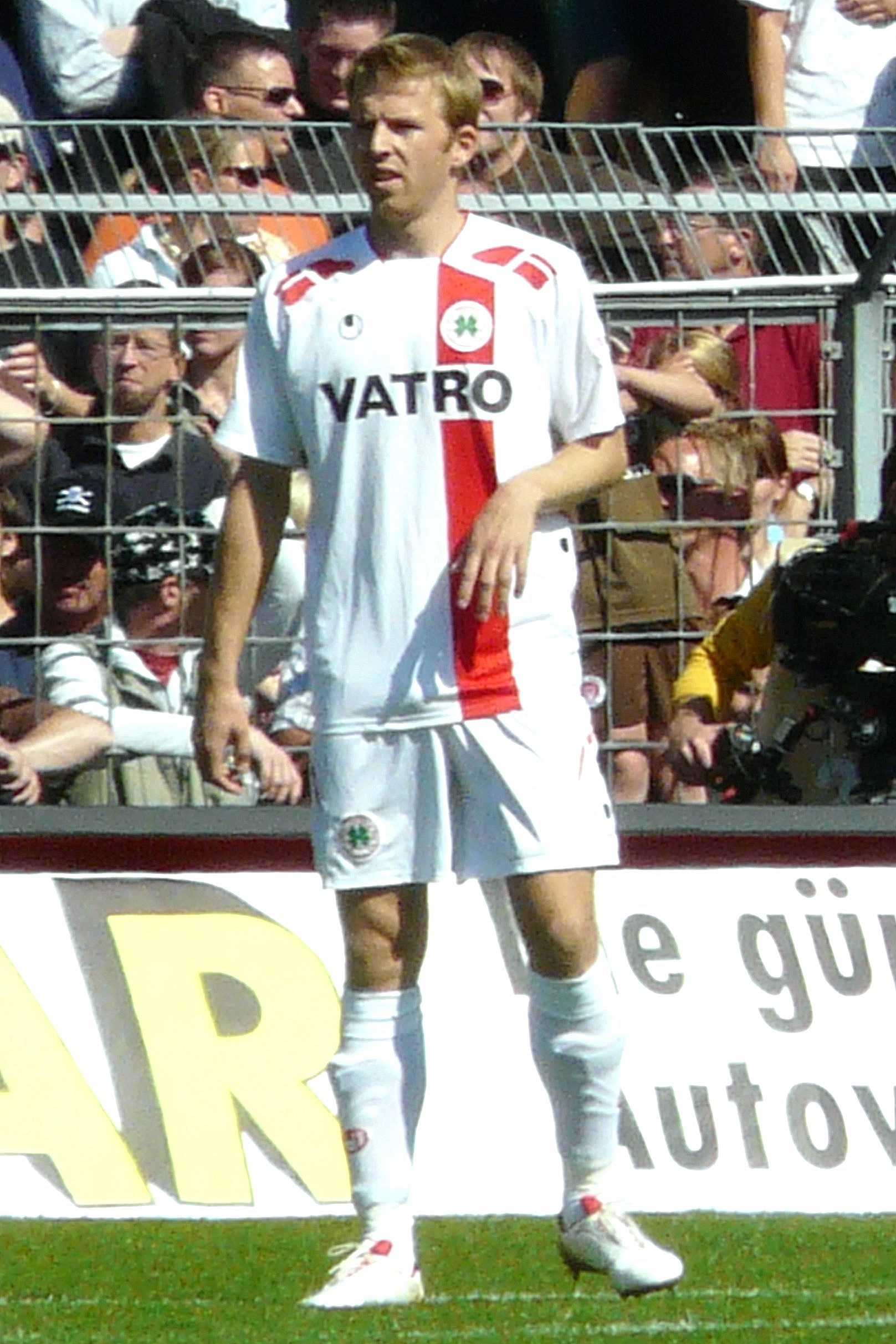

Personal information
- Date of birth: 14 April 1981 (age 45)
- Place of birth: Duisburg, West Germany
- Height: 1.83 m (6 ft 0 in)
- Position: Defender

Youth career
- Duisburger SV 1900
- MSV Duisburg
- –1997: Duisburger FV 08
- 1997–2000: Borussia Mönchengladbach

Senior career*
Years	Team	Apps	(Gls)
2000–2004	Borussia Mönchengladbach II		
2002–2003	Borussia Mönchengladbach	9	(0)
2004	TuS Koblenz	0	(0)
2005–2006	Wuppertaler SV Borussia	11	(1)
2006–2011	Rot-Weiß Oberhausen	99	(0)
2011–2013	VfB Homberg	69	(1)
2013–2014	Rot-Weiß Oberhausen II	29	(0)

Managerial career
- 2014–2015: Rot-Weiß Oberhausen II (assistant)
- * Club domestic league appearances and goals

Daniel Embers (born 14 April 1981 in Duisburg) is a German football coach and former footballer.

He made his debut on the professional league level in the Bundesliga for Borussia Mönchengladbach on 16 November 2002, when he started in a game against Bayer 04 Leverkusen.
