= Bastian Henning =

German footballer

Personal information
- Date of birth: 27 May 1983 (age 43)
- Place of birth: Kiel, West Germany
- Height: 1.89 m (6 ft 2 1/2 in)
- Position: Striker

Team information
- Current team: FC Schönberg 95
- Number: 18

Youth career
- 1986–2000: TuS Felde
- 2000–2003: Holstein Kiel
- 2003: TuS Felde
- 2003–2004: Rendsburger TSV
- 2004–2008: TSV Kropp

Senior career*
| Years | Team | Apps | (Gls) |
| 2008–2011 | VfB Lübeck | 92 | (35) |
| 2011–2012 | Chemnitzer FC | 18 | (2) |
| 2012– | FC Schönberg 95 | 44 | (19) |
- * Club domestic league appearances and goals as of 25 June 2015

Bastian Henning (born 27 May 1983) is a German footballer who plays for FC Schönberg 95.
