= Fikri El Haj Ali =

German footballer

Personal information
- Date of birth: 17 November 1985 (age 40)
- Place of birth: Frankfurt am Main, West Germany
- Height: 1.81 m (5 ft 11 in)
- Position: Striker

Team information
- Current team: Griesheim Tarik

Youth career
- FSV Frankfurt

Senior career*
| Years | Team | Apps | (Gls) |
| 2004–2005 | Tarik Griesheim | 20 | (1) |
| 2005–2006 | FSV Frankfurt II | 16 | (2) |
| 2006–2007 | Borussia Fulda | 25 | (9) |
| 2007–2009 | FSV Frankfurt | 16 | (2) |
| 2009–2010 | Wacker Burghausen | 32 | (6) |
| 2010–2011 | FC Rot-Weiß Erfurt | 10 | (0) |
| 2013–2014 | SG Ober-Erlenbach | | |
| 2014–2016 | Türk Gücü Friedberg | | |
| 2016 | Viktoria Griesheim | 0 | (0) |
| 2016– | Griesheim Tarik | 21 | (11) |
- * Club domestic league appearances and goals

Fikri El Haj Ali (born 17 November 1985 in Frankfurt am Main) is a German footballer who plays for SV Griesheim Tarik.

== Personal life ==
He also holds Moroccan citizenship.
